= Swedish Coastal Artillery =

Former branch of the Swedish Armed Forces

- Kustartilleriet
- Coat of arms
- Active: 1901–2000
- Country: Sweden
- Allegiance: Swedish Armed Forces (1901–2000)
- Branch: Swedish Navy
- Type: Coastal artillery Marines
- Role: Amphibious warfare Anti-aircraft warfare Coastal defence and fortification Counter-battery fire Raiding; Reconnaissance
- Size: Five regiments
- March: "För kustartilleriet" (Åke Dohlin)

Insignia
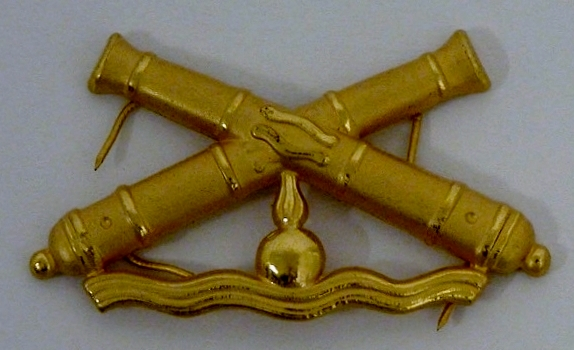
- Insignia m/60

The Swedish Coastal Artillery (Swedish: Kustartilleriet, KA) has its origin in the Archipelago Artillery that was raised in 1866. The Coastal Artillery was formed from the Archipelago Artillery, the Marine Regiment and parts of the Artillery in 1902. The Coastal Artillery was an independent branch within the Swedish Navy until 1 July 2000, when it was disbanded and reorganised as the Swedish Amphibious Corps. The changed name and new structure were to reflect the new tasks that the old coastal artillery had moved to after the end of the Cold War and the demise of the Warsaw Pact.

== History ==
=== The early years ===
The Swedish Coastal Artillery can trace its traditions as far back as the old coastal fortresses that were in use around Sweden since the 15th century. In the old days these would have been under the command structure of the fortress artillery department. The real first move to an independent branch was the creation of the Vaxholm Artillery Corps in 1889. Before this all coastal artillery units that were stationed on coastal defence fortresses or city fortresses were under the command of the fortress artillery department which in turn was a branch of the Artillery. Since the establishment of the fixed mine defence units during the 19th century, the question of an independent branch of the Swedish Armed Forces was again raised. This resulted in the creation of the modern Coastal Artillery in 1902 as an independent branch within the Royal Swedish Navy through a merge of Vaxholm Artillery Corps, Karlskrona Artillery Corps and the fixed mine defence units.

=== The modern Swedish Coastal Artillery is born ===
The coastal artillery received a permanent organization in 1902 and from then on belonged entirely to the navy. It consisted of 1 chief (general officer) and other personnel, distributed among 2 regiments, Vaxholm Coastal Artillery Regiment (KA 1) and Karlskrona Coastal Artillery Regiment (KA 2), comprising (in 1911) a total of 99 officers (colonels, lieutenant colonels, majors, captains, lieutenants, and underlöjtnant's), 166 non-commissioned officers (of the 1st degree: styckjunkare ("gunnery sergeants"), flaggjunkare ("chief petty officers"), flaggmaskinister ("chief machinists"), flaggrustmästare ("chief gunsmiths"), and stabstrumpetare ("staff buglers"); of the 2nd degree: sergeants, staff buglers, machinists, rustmästare, and torpedmästare ("torpedo masters")), and 1,361 enlisted personnel (corporals, lance corporals, and 1st, 2nd, and 3rd class coastal artillerymen) along with conscripts. The former regiment manned Vaxholm and Oskar-Fredriksborg fortresses as well as the coastal positions of Fårösund on the northern tip of Gotland and Hörningsholm, while the latter manned Karlskrona and Älvsborg fortresses, located near the main shipping channel into Gothenburg. The coastal artillery's equipment consisted of all coastal positions' fortifications and other installations, artillery pieces with ammunition, torpedo batteries, mines, searchlights, mine crane barges, steam launches, boats, etc.

=== World War I ===
During the First World War, it was also decided that the area of responsibility should also include the stationing of units at Hemsö and at Luleå (until 1953 a detachment from Älvsborg which, finally, in 1975, was made into a separate regiment, the Härnösand Coastal Artillery Regiment).

=== Interwar years ===
The detachment at Fårösund was reorganised as a separate unit in 1937 and renamed Gotland Coastal Artillery Regiment in 1937.

=== World War II ===
After a reduction in units after the 1925 defence proposition, there was a significant expansion of all the branches of the Swedish Armed Forces. In particular, the artillery in the Coastal Artillery was modernised and new materiel made in Sweden and imported (from e.g. Czechoslovakia) were introduced. The defence line built on the coast of Skåne during World War II was called the Per Albin Line. The detachment in Gothenburg was reorganised and expanded into the Älvsborg Coastal Artillery Regiment in 1942. During World War II and onwards, about 60 coastal artillery batteries were built along the Swedish coast.

=== Cold War ===
With the advent of Marinplan 60 there was a move towards standardization of equipment and an increase in mobile units, one of the most significant additions to the Swedish Coastal Artillery during the 1950s was the creation of the Coastal Ranger companies as a mobile reconnaissance and attack component.

The Swedish Coastal Artillery was up to the mid-1990s mostly a collection of fixed and mobile units located in the different Swedish archipelagos, and using the layered defense principle in employing guns of varying caliber and range - from the Saab Rb 08 surface to surface missile for a range of up to 70 kms, to the vintage 283 mm cannons for ranges upto 40 kms, 120 mm cannons for ranges upto 20 kms, 105 mm and 75 mm Guns for ranges of 8 kms to 12 kms, and 40 mm autocannons, 20 mm autocannons, 12.7 mm Heavy Machine Guns, Automatic Grenade Launchers, 81 mm and 60 mm Mortars for ranges of 500 metres to 8 kms. The main purpose of the Swedish Coastal Artillery was to defend and maintain a visible presence in the Swedish archipelago, and even in peacetime maintain a high level of readiness. Units that where stationed around the more important shipping lanes and other naval installations around Sweden were fully manned, even in peacetime.

During the 1970s, the invasion threat to the coast very much a reality for the Swedish Armed Forces. Therefore, the guns made by Bofors with related combat management, radar and air defence received a powerful protection against all kinds of chemical warfare agents. During the 1980s there was a general move towards modernization in the Swedish defence forces and the Coastal Artillery received several new weapon systems in the 1980s and 1990s, like the new 12/70 TAP fixed artillery system, the mobile artillery system 12/80 KARIN, the Stridsbåt 90 combat craft and missile systems like the RBS-15 and RBS-17. The Coastal Artillery also modernized its ASW or anti-submarine capabilities in a response to the submarine incursions that plagued Sweden during the 1980s and early 1990s. Also, this was a step towards an increased ability to monitor and maintain high level of surveillance of Sweden’s harbours and shipping lanes against any foreign undersea aggression or incursion into Swedish territorial waters.

The Swedish Coastal Artillery was in a constant level of development during the last century as the threat levels changed around the world, the main threat to Sweden after the World War II was the threat of a war in Europe. Even if Sweden had not been directly involved, there was always a risk of an incursion into Sweden of a foreign power during a major war in Europe.

In 1986 and 1990, a change was made within the Swedish Navy's lower regional management level, where the coastal artillery defence was merged regionally with the naval bases. The new authority that was formed through the mergers was called naval command. Thus, all marine combat forces within each geographical area were led by a joint commander. Thus, the five geographical coastal artillery defences were disbanded, which were integrated with the coastal artillery regiments in the new naval commands. The coastal artillery regiments remained with their own staffs within the command.

=== Swedish Amphibious Corps ===
The Defence Act of 2000 meant that the fixed coastal artillery would be completely disbanded. The decommissioning was carried out by the East Coast Naval Base and the South Coast Naval Base, as well as the Swedish Armed Forces Logistics. Most of the old guns were scrapped. Some batteries, such as Ellenabben in Karlskrona archipelago and the Femöre Fortress outside Oxelösund, were preserved as museums. Some part of the battery at Landsort was also preserved. On 1 July 2000 the Swedish Amphibious Corps was organized, including Vaxholm Amphibian Regiment (Amf 1), Älvsborg Amphibian Regiment (Amf 4) and Amphibian Combat School (Amfibiestridsskolan, AmfSS).

== Units ==
=== Coastal artillery defences ===
Designation	English name	Name	Active	Note
BK	Blekinge Coastal Artillery Defence	Blekinge kustartilleriförsvar	1942–1990	Amalgamated into the South Coast Naval Command in 1990
GbK	Gothenburg Coastal Artillery Defence	Göteborgs kustartilleriförsvar	1942–1981	Amalgamated into the West Coast Naval Command in 1981
GK	Gotland Coastal Artillery Defence	Gotlands kustartilleriförsvar	1942–1990	Amalgamated into the East Coast Naval Command in 1990
NK	Norrland Coastal Artillery Defence	Norrlands kustartilleriförsvar	1942–1990	Amalgamated into the South Coast Naval Command in 1990
SK	Stockholm Coastal Artillery Defence	Stockholms kustartilleriförsvar	1942–1990	Amalgamated into the North Coast Naval Command in 1990

=== Coastal artillery brigades ===
A coastal artillery brigade was the highest unit the Swedish Coastal Artillery. From the late 1980s there were six brigades. Later, all but two coastal artillery brigades were renamed marine brigades (marinbrigader). Both naval and army units were included, and the personnel varied between 3,000 and 9,000 (In both KAB 1 and KAB 3, there were plenty of army units; KAB 1, for example, had 3 bicycle infantry battalions grouped for tasks at Väddö). The units were decommissioned from the war organization in the Defence Act of 2000.

Designation	English name	Name	Active	Note
KAB 1	1st Coastal Artillery Brigade	Första kustartilleribrigaden	1956–1994	Reorganized into a marine brigade in 1994
RMB	Roslagen Marine Brigade	Roslagens marinbrigad	1994–1997	Reorganized into a marine regiment in 1998
RMR	Roslagen Marine Regiment	Roslagens marinregemente	1998–2000	
KAB 2	2nd Coastal Artillery Brigade	Andra kustartilleribrigaden	1956–2000	
KAB 3	3rd Coastal Artillery Brigade	Tredje kustartilleribrigaden	1956–1997	Reorganized into a marine brigade in 1994
SMB	Södertörn Marine Brigade	Södertörns marinbrigad	1994–1997	Reorganized into a marine regiment in 1998
SMR	Södertörn Marine Regiment	Södertörns marinregemente	1998–2000	
KAB 4	4th Coastal Artillery Brigade	Fjärde kustartilleribrigaden	1956–2000	
KAB 5	5th Coastal Artillery Brigade	Femte kustartilleribrigaden	1956–1997	Reorganized into a marine brigade in 1994
GMB	Gothenburg Marine Brigade	Göteborgs marinbrigad	1994–1997	
KAB 6	6th Coastal Artillery Brigade	Sjätte kustartilleribrigaden	1956–1994	Reorganized into a marine brigade in 1994
FMB	Fårösund Marine Brigade	Fårösunds marinbrigad	1994–2000	

=== Training units ===
Designation	English name	Name	Active	Note
KA 1	Vaxholm Coastal Artillery Regiment	Vaxholms kustartilleriregemente	1902–2000	
KA 2	Karlskrona Coastal Artillery Regiment	Karlskrona kustartilleriregemente	1902–2000	
KA 3	Gotland Coastal Artillery Regiment	Gotlands kustartilleriregemente	1937–2000	
KA 4	Älvsborg Coastal Artillery Regiment	Älvsborgs kustartilleriregemente	1942–2000	
KA 5	Härnösand Coastal Artillery Regiment	Härnösands kustartilleriregemente	1943–1998	
KAS	Swedish Coastal Artillery Combat School	Kustartilleriets stridsskola	1902–2000	

== Heraldry and traditions ==
=== Coat of arms ===
The coat of arms of the Swedish Coastal Artillery 1979–2000, the Coastal Artillery Center (Kustartillericentrum, KAC) 1995–1997 and the Swedish Amphibious Corps since 2000. Blazon: "Gules, two gunbarrels of older pattern in saltire above a flaming grenade and waves, all or".

=== Marsch ===
The march of Älvsborg Coastal Artillery Regiment (KA 4), ie Sam Rydberg's "I beredskap", was used as a joint coastal artillery march. In the autumn of 1985, composer Åke Dohlin thought that the Coastal Artillery should have its own march, and in this way "För kustartilleriet" was added. The march was dedicated to the then Inspector of Coastal Artillery, Senior Colonel Kjell Lodenius.

== Commanding officers ==
=== Commanders of the Coastal Artillery ===
Commanders of the Coastal Artillery (Chefer för kustartilleriet, CKA)

- 1902–1907: Anders Fredrik Centerwall
- 1907–1909: Otto Ludvig Beckman
- 1909–1924: Herman Wrangel
- 1924–1929: Herman Wrangel
- 1929–1941: Tor Wahlman

=== Inspectors of the Coastal Artillery ===
Inspectors of the Coastal Artillery (Inspektörer för kustartilleriet, IKA)

- 1941–1953: Hjalmar Åström
- 1953–1961: Rudolf Kolmodin
- 1958–1960: Alf Nyman (acting)
- 1961–1964: Henrik Lange
- 1962–1969: Olof Karlberg (acting)
- 1964–1970: Arne Widner
- 1971–1980: Erik Lyth
- 1981–1985: Per-Erik Bergstrand
- 1985–1987: Kjell Lodenius
- 1987–1990: Ulf Rubarth
- 1990–1994: Nils Eklund
- 1994–1996: Per Lundbeck
- 1996–1997: Claes-Göran Hedén
- 1997–1998: Stellan Fagrell

== See also ==
Cold war Swedish Coastal Artillery guns:

- 7.5 cm tornpjäs m/57
- 10.5 cm tornautomatpjäs m/50
- 12 cm tornautomatpjäs m/70
- 12 cm mobile coastal artillery gun m/80

Similar units

- People's Liberation Army Navy Coastal Defense Force - China
