= Structure of the Swedish Home Guard =

The following is an overview of the Swedish Home Guard's operational and peacetime organization. The Swedish Home Guard is commanded by the Chief of Defence based at the Swedish Armed Forces Headquarters in Stockholm.

== Home Guard Staff ==
- Home Guard Staff

=== Northern Military Region ===
The Northern Military Region is responsible for supporting Home Guard units in, Jämtland County, Norrbotten County, Västerbotten County, and Västernorrland County with training and administrative resources.

- Northern Military Region, in Boden
  - Lapland Ranger Group (Lapplandsjägargruppen – LJG), in Kiruna (Northern Norrbotten County)
    - Lapland Ranger Battalion (Lapplandsjägarbataljonen – 10th Home Guard Battalion), in Kiruna
    - Border Ranger Battalion (Gränsjägarbataljonen – 11th Home Guard Battalion), in Kalix
  - Norrbotten Group (Norrbottensgruppen – NBG), in Boden (Southern Norrbotten County)
    - Norrbotten Battalion (Norrbottensbataljonen – 12th Home Guard Battalion), in Luleå
  - Västerbotten Group (Västerbottensgruppen – VBG), in Umeå (Västerbotten County)
    - Västerbotten Battalion (Västerbottensbataljonen – 13th Home Guard Battalion), in Umeå
  - Field Ranger Group (Fältjägargruppen – FJG), in Östersund (Jämtland County)
    - Field Ranger Battalion (Fältjägarbataljonen – 14th Home Guard Battalion), in Östersund
  - Västernorrland Group (Västernorrlandsgruppen – VNG), in Härnösand (Västernorrland County)
    - Ångermanland Battalion (Ångermanlandsbataljonen – 15th Home Guard Battalion, Ångermanland province), in Örnsköldsvik
    - Medelpad Battalion (Medelpadsbataljonen – 16th Home Guard Battalion, Medelpad province), in Sundsvall

=== Central Military Region ===
The Central Military Region is responsible for supporting Home Guard units in Dalarna County, Gävleborg County, Södermanland County, Stockholm County, Uppsala County, and Västmanland County with training and administrative resources.

- Central Military Region, in Kungsängen
  - Dalarna Regiment Group (Dalregementsgruppen – DRG), in Falun (Dalarna County)
    - Dalarna Battalion (Dalabataljonen – 17th Home Guard Battalion), in Falun
  - Gävleborg Group (Gävleborgsgruppen – GBG), in Gävle (Gävleborg County)
    - Gävleborg Battalion (Gävleborgsbataljonen – 18th Home Guard Battalion), in Gävle
  - Uppland and Västmanland Group (Upplands- och Västmanlandsgruppen – UVG), in Enköping (Uppsala and Västmanland counties)
    - Uppland Battalion (Upplandsbataljonen – 21st Home Guard Battalion), in Uppsala
    - Västmanland Battalion (Västmanlandsbataljonen – 22nd Home Guard Battalion), in Västerås
  - Life Guards Group (Livgardesgruppen – LGG), in Kungsängen (Stockholm County)
    - Attundaland Battalion (Attundalandsbataljonen – 23rd Home Guard Battalion), in Stockholm
    - Stockholm Battalion (Stockholmsbataljonen – 24th Home Guard Battalion), in Stockholm
    - Telgehus Battalion (Telgehusbataljonen – 25th Home Guard Battalion), in Södertälje
    - Ulvsunda Battalion (Ulvsundabataljonen – 26th Home Guard Battalion), in Stockholm
  - Södermanland Group (Södermanlandsgruppen – SLG), in Strängnäs (Södermanland County)
    - Södermanland Battalion (Södermanlandsbataljonen – 27th Home Guard Battalion), in Strängnäs
  - Södertörn Group (Södertörnsgruppen – UGS), at Berga Naval Base (Coastal areas of Stockholm County)
    - Roslagen Battalion (Roslagsbataljonen – 28th Home Guard Battalion), in Norrtälje in Roslagen
    - Södertörn Battalion (Södertörnsbataljonen – 29th Home Guard Battalion), at Berga Naval Base in Södertörn
  - Gotland Group (Gotlandsgruppen – GLG), in Visby
    - Gotland Battalion (Gotlandsbataljonen – 32nd Home Guard Battalion), in Visby

=== Southern Military Region ===
The Southern Military Region is responsible for supporting Home Guard units in Blekinge County, Jönköping County, Kalmar County, Kronoberg County, Skåne County, and Östergötland County with training and administrative resources.

- Southern Military Region, in Revingeby
  - Life Grenadier Group (Livgrenadjärgruppen – LGAG), in Linköping (Östergötland County)
    - 1st Life Grenadier Battalion (Första livgrenadjärbataljonen – 30th Home Guard Battalion), in Linköping
    - 2nd Life Grenadier Battalion (Andra livgrenadjärbataljonen – 31st Home Guard Battalion), in Norrköping
  - North Småland Group (Norra Smålandsgruppen – NSG), in Eksjö (Jönköping County)
    - North Småland Battalion (Norra Smålandsbataljonen – 33rd Home Guard Battalion), in Jönköping
  - Kalmar and Kronoberg Group (Kalmar- och Kronobergsgruppen – KRAG), in Växjö (Kalmar and Kronoberg counties)
    - Kalmar Battalion (Kalmarbataljonen – 34th Home Guard Battalion), in Kalmar
    - Kronoberg Battalion (Kronobergsbataljonen – 35th Home Guard Battalion), in Växjö
  - Blekinge Group (Blekingegruppen – BLG), in Karlskrona (Blekinge County)
    - Blekinge Western Battalion (Blekinge västra bataljon – 36th Home Guard Battalion), in Ronneby
    - Blekinge Eastern Battalion (Blekinge östra bataljon – 37th Home Guard Battalion), in Karlskrona
  - Scanian Group (Skånska gruppen – SSK), in Revingeby (Skåne County)
    - South Scanian Battalion (Södra skånska bataljonen – 46th Home Guard Battalion), in Lund
    - Malmöhus Battalion (Malmöhusbataljonen – 47th Home Guard Battalion), in Malmö (Malmöhus County)
    - Scanian Dragoon Battalion (Skånska dragonbataljonen – 48th Home Guard Battalion), in Helsingborg
    - North Scanian Battalion (Norra skånska bataljonen – 49th Home Guard Battalion), in Kristianstad

=== Western Military Region ===
The Western Military Region is responsible for supporting Home Guard units in Halland County, Värmland County, Västra Götaland County, and Örebro County with training and administrative resources.

- Western Military Region, in Skövde
  - Örebro and Värmland Group (Örebro- och Värmlandsgruppen – ÖVG), in Örebro (Örebro and Värmland counties)
    - Värmland Battalion (Värmlandsbataljonen – 19th Home Guard Battalion), in Karlstad
    - Sannahed Battalion (Sannahedsbataljonen – 20th Home Guard Battalion), in Örebro
  - Skaraborg Group (Skaraborgsgruppen – SKG), in Skövde (Västra Götaland County)
    - Kinne Battalion (Kinnebataljonen – 38th Home Guard Battalion), in Lidköping
    - Kåkind Battalion (Kåkindbataljonen – 39th Home Guard Battalion), in Skövde
  - Bohusdal Group (Bohusdalgruppen – BDG), in Skredsvik (Bohuslän and Dalsland provinces)
    - Bohus Battalion (Bohusbataljonen – 40th Home Guard Battalion), in Uddevalla
  - Elfsborg Group (Elfsborgsgruppen – EBG), in Käringberget (City of Gothenburg)
    - Gothenburg Southern Battalion (Göteborgs södra bataljon – 41st Home Guard Battalion), in Gothenburg
    - Gothenburg Northern Battalion (Göteborgs norra bataljon – 42nd Home Guard Battalion), in Gothenburg
    - Gothenburg Archipelago Battalion (Göteborgs skärgårds bataljon – 43rd Home Guard Battalion), in Gothenburg
    - Älvsborg Battalion (Älvsborgsbataljonen – 44th Home Guard Battalion), in Borås
  - Halland Group (Hallandsgruppen – HAG), in Halmstad (Halland County)
    - Halland Battalion (Hallandsbataljonen – 45th Home Guard Battalion), in Halmstad

== Swedish Home Guard organization graphic ==
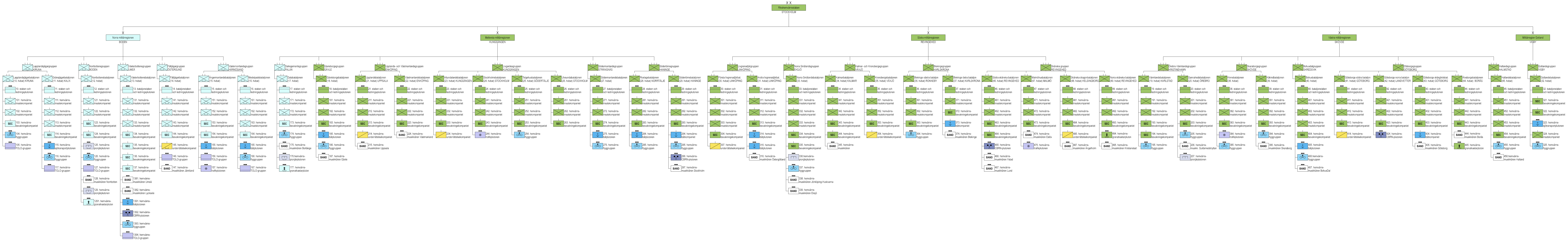
Swedish Home Guard organization as of April 2026 (click image to enlarge)

== Geographic distribution ==
Swedish Home Guard locations 2025:
