= Vaxholm Coastal Artillery Regiment =

Coordinates: 59°23′35″N 18°25′53″E

- Vaxholms kustartilleriregemente
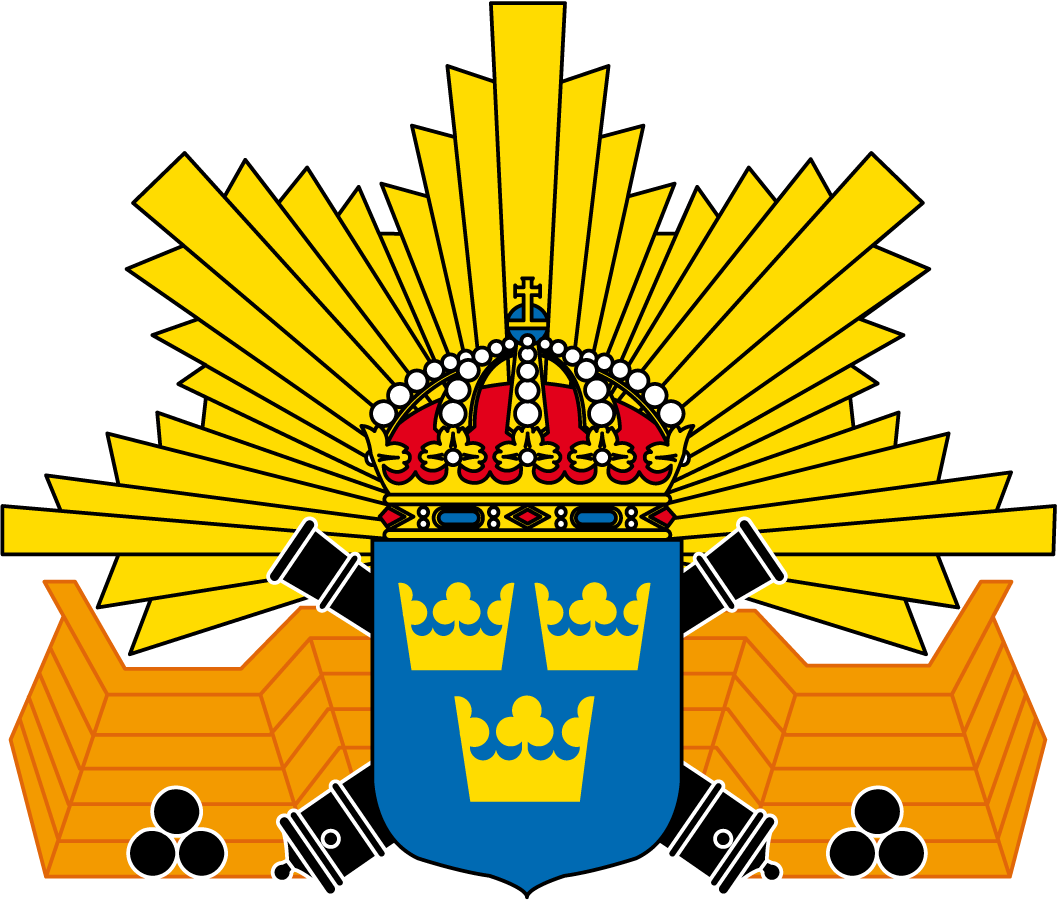
- Active: 1902–2000
- Country: Sweden
- Allegiance: Swedish Armed Forces
- Branch: Swedish Navy
- Type: Coastal artillery
- Size: Regiment
- Part of: MDO (1933–1957); MKO (1957–1966); Milo Ö (1966–1985); SK/KA 1 (1985–1990); MKO (1990–1994); Milo M (1994–2000)
- Garrison/HQ: Rindö
- March: "Honnör för Finska Gardet" by R. Arnoldsson (1902–1948) "Gardeskamrater" by S. Rydberg (1948–2000) (Note: The march was adopted in 1948 and established on 13 June 1996. It was taken over by the Vaxholm Amphibian Regiment (Amf 1) in 2000.)

Commanders
- Notable commanders: Håkan Syrén

Insignia
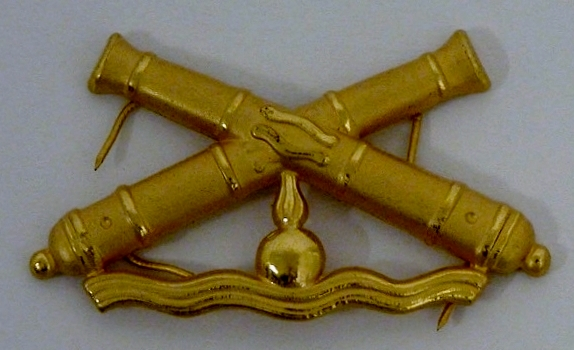
- Branch insignia

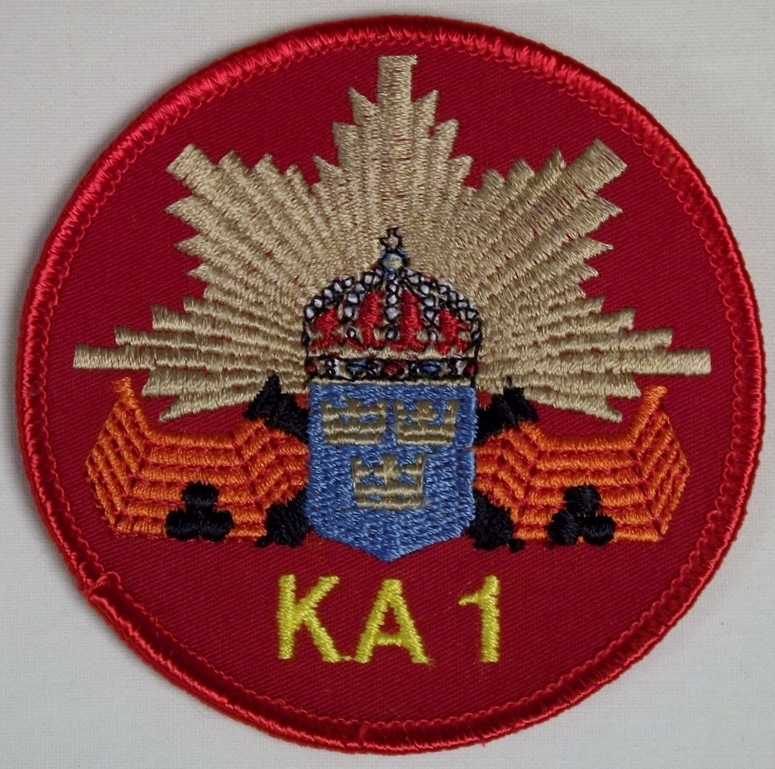
- Shoulder sleeve insignia

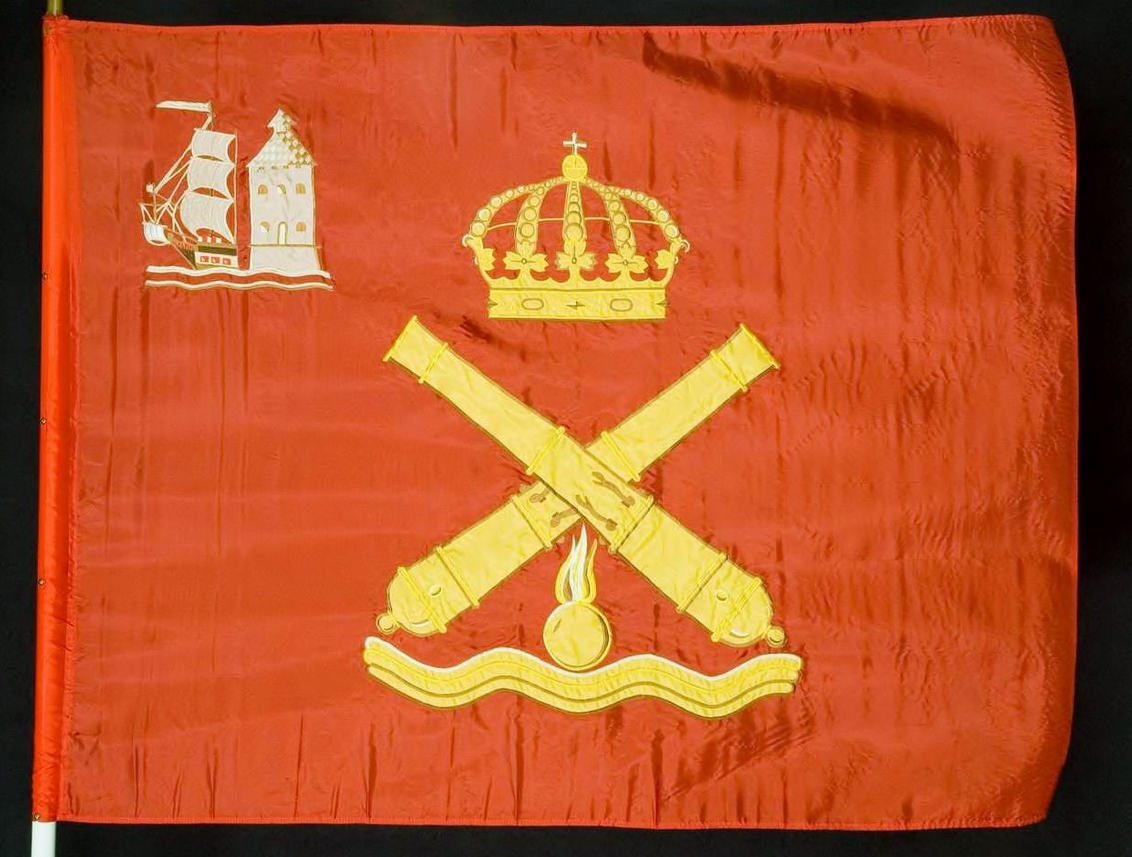
- Colour

The Vaxholm Coastal Artillery Regiment (Swedish: Vaxholms kustartilleriregemente), designation KA 1, was a Swedish Navy coastal artillery regiment of the Swedish Armed Forces which operated between 1902 and 2000. The unit was based at Rindö in the Stockholm archipelago in Uppland.

== History ==
On 1 January 1902, the Swedish Coastal Artillery was established as a separate military branch in the Swedish Armed Forces, following a decision taken in May the previous year. The decision meant that Karlskrona Artillery Corps and Vaxholm Artillery Corps was disbanded and that a coastal artillery was established. The Vaxholm Artillery Corps was transferred to the coastal artillery and formed the Vaxholm Coastal Artillery Regiment (KA 1). The regiment manned the Vaxholm Fortress and Oskar-Fredriksborg Fortress as well as Fårösund's coastal position and Hörningsholm's coastal position.

The regimental buildings, drawn by Erik Josephson, were completed in 1906. The barracks were completed already in 1904 and had three floors unlike the design which had four. Parts of KA 1 was placed at Vaxholm and it was not until the 1940s that the operations were collocated to eastern Rindö next to Oskar-Fredriksborg Fortress. KA 1 consisted of artillery companies, naval mine companies and yrkes (occupational) companies: an organization that was maintained until the 1940s. In 1941, the former buildings of the Vaxholm Grenadier Regiment (I 26) became a part of the KA 1. The part of the KA 1 that has been placed at the Vaxholm Fortress was instead placed in the former barracks of I 26.

In 1981 the regiment became subordinated to the Stockholm Coastal Artillery Defense (Stockholms kustartilleriförsvar, SK/Fo 46) and renamed Stockholm Coastal Artillery Defense with Vaxholm Coastal Artillery Regiment (Stockholms kustartilleriförsvar med Vaxholms kustartilleriregemente, SK/KA 1). This organization was retained until SK was merge with the East Coast Naval Command in 1990. The regiment was renamed the Vaxholm Amphibian Regiment (Amf 1) in 2000, when parts of the coastal artillery was converted into the Swedish Amphibious Corps. The Vaxholm Coastal Artillery Regiment was disbanded on 31 October 2000 as a result of the disarmament policies set forward in the Defence Act of 2000.

== Organization ==
In 1956 the organization was as follows:

- Blocking battalion with battalion staff
1. Battalion (staff and military communications training)
2. Battalion (heavy naval artillery)
3. Battalion (light naval artillery)
- Naval mine battalion and battalion staff
- Naval Mine School
1. Minelayer division (mine and dive training)
2. Minelayer division (boat training)
- Close Combat School (Närförsvarsskolan) with school staff
1. Coastal Ranger Company
2. Coastal Ranger Company

== Units ==
=== 1st Coastal Artillery Brigade ===
The 1st Coastal Artillery Brigade (Första kustartilleribrigaden, KAB 1) was raised in 1956 as a coastal artillery brigade and was in the peace organization under the Vaxholm Coastal Artillery Regiment. The brigade consisted initially in the war organization of a staff at Hamnholmen and two barrier battalions (spärrbataljoner based on Arholma and Söderarm and local defense battalions. In 1984, the brigade's war organization consisted of three barrier battalions, the Roten, Arholma and Söderarm, and local defense battalions. On 1 July 1994, the brigade was also separated from the regiment in the peace organization and reorganized into the Roslagen Marine Brigade (RMB).

=== 2nd Coastal Artillery Brigade ===
The 2nd Coastal Artillery Brigade (Andra kustartilleribrigaden, KAB 2) was raised in 1956 as a coastal artillery brigade and was in the peace and war organization under the Vaxholm Coastal Artillery Regiment. The brigade consisted initially in the war organization of a staff at Rindö and barrier battalion based on Korsö and two coastal ranger companies as well as two missile batteries. In 1984, the brigade's war organization consisted of the Korsö barrier battalion, three mobile barrier companies and three coastal ranger companies. On 1 July 1994, the brigade was reorganized into a mobile brigade command with assembly point in the middle of Stockholm archipelago. In 1996, the brigade consisted of, among other things, the Korsö barrier battalion (which is now called marine defense battalion kustförsvarsbataljon), the 1st Amphibious Battalion (1. amfibiebataljonen) and the Battle Group Oxdjupet (submarine security company). The brigade was disbanded on 30 June 2000 and, from 1 July 2000, formed the basis of the Vaxholm Amphibian Regiment (Amf 1).

=== 3rd Coastal Artillery Brigade ===
The 3rd Coastal Artillery Brigade (Tredje kustartilleribrigaden, KAB 3) was raised in 1956 and was in the peace organization under the Vaxholm Coastal Artillery Regiment. The brigade consisted in the war organization of a staff on Järflotta and three barrier battalions, Ornö, Mellsten and Askö. On 1 July 1994, the brigade was also separated from the regiment in the peace organization and reorganized into the Södertörn Marine Brigade (SMB).

== Heraldry and traditions ==
=== Coat of arms ===
The coat of arms of the Vaxholm Coastal Artillery Regiment (KA 1) 1902–1994, the 2nd Coastal Artillery Brigade with Vaxholm Coastal Artillery Regiment (KAB 2/KA 1) 1994–2000 and Vaxholm Amphibian Regiment (Amf 1) since 2000. Blazon: "Azure, the lesser coat of arms of Sweden, three open crowns or placed two and one, a cluster of rays or coming from the crown. The shield surmounted two gunbarrels of older pattern in saltire sable between two pyramids of three gunballs sable each in front of a wall embattled as a bastion, coloured brick".

=== March ===
The regiment's first march was composed by Robert Arnoldsson (1869–1917) and was used as a unit march at KA 1 from 1902 to 1948. Arnoldsson started as music director in Vaxholm Artillery Corps in 1893 and transferred to KA 1 in 1902 and stayed with the regiment until 1916. The march was composed during the time of the artillery corps. The commander of K 1 from 1940 to 1947, Colonel Allen Cyrus, worked during his time as regimental commander to have KA 1's old march Arnoldsson replaced. However, it was his successor Colonel Emil Cederlöf who in 1948 adopted Sam Rydberg's 1936 march "Gardeskamrater". However, the regimental commander did not like one of the repetitions and Rydberg changed the march, after which it was adopted. The march was formally established on 13 June 1996. It was taken over by the Vaxholm Amphibian Regiment (Amf 1) in 2000.

== Commanding officers ==
=== Commanders ===
- 1902–1904: Colonel Oskar Sylvander
- 1904–1914: Colonel Karl Wirgin
- 1914–1924: Colonel Herman Gustaf Mauritz Wrangel
- 1924–1926: Colonel Sam Bolling
- 1926–1929: Colonel Tor Wahlman
- 1929–1935: Colonel Theodor Hasselgren
- 1935–1936: Colonel Harald Engblom
- 1936–1940: Colonel Frej Allbrandt
- 1940–1947: Colonel Allan Cyrus
- 1940–1941: Hjalmar Åström (acting)
- 1947–1951: Colonel Emil Cederlöf
- 1951–1957: Colonel Bo Lindeberg
- 1957–1962: Colonel Olof Karlberg
- 1962–1967: Colonel Curt Karlberg
- 1967–1969: Colonel Björn Engwall
- 1969–1974: Colonel Eric Jarneberg
- 1974–1977: Colonel Sven-Åke Adler
- 1977–1981: Colonel Gunnar Fernander
- 1981–1983: Colonel Lars G. Persson
- 1983–1987: Colonel Per Lundbeck
- 1987–1989: Colonel Fredrik Hillelson
- 1990–1992: Colonel Bertil Kristensson
- 1992–1994: Colonel Claes-Göran Hedén
- 1994–1996: Colonel Håkan Syrén
- 1996–2000: Colonel Stefan Jontell

=== Deputy commanders ===
- 1982–1984: Lieutenant colonel Fredrik Hillelson

== Names, designations and locations ==
Name	Translation	From		To
Vaxholms kustartilleriregemente	Vaxholm Coastal Artillery Regiment	1902-01-01	–	1984-12-31?
Stockholms kustartilleriförsvar med Vaxholms kustartilleriregemente	Stockholm Coastal Artillery Defence with Vaxholm Coastal Artillery Regiment	1937-07-01	–	1957-03-31
Vaxholms kustartilleriregemente	Vaxholm Coastal Artillery Regiment	1990-07-01	–	1994-06-30
Andra kustartilleribrigaden med Vaxholms kustartilleriregemente	2nd Coastal Artillery Brigade with Vaxholm Coastal Artillery Regiment	1994-07-01	–	1998-06-30
Vaxholms kustartilleriregemente och första kustartilleribrigaden	Vaxholm Coastal Artillery Regiment and the 1st Coastal Artillery Brigade	1998-07-01	–	2000-06-30
Designation		From		To
KA 1		1902-01-01	–	1984-12-31?
SK/KA 1		1985-01-01?	–	1990-06-30
MKO/KA 1		1990-07-01	–	1994-06-30
KAB 2/KA 1		1994-07-01	–	1998-06-30
KA 1/KAB 1		1998-07-01	–	2000-06-30
Location		From		To
Vaxholm Garrison/Rindö		1902-01-01	–	2000-06-30

== See also ==
- Vaxholm Artillery Corps
- Vaxholm Grenadier Regiment
- List of Swedish coastal artillery regiments
