= Tor Wahlman =

Swedish officer (1878–1954)

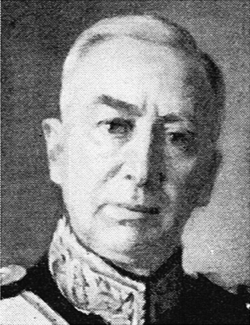
- Born: Tor Carl Nicolaus Wahlman; 10 August 1878; Stockholm, Sweden
- Died: 7 August 1954 (aged 75); Stockholm, Sweden
- Burial place: Norra begravningsplatsen
- Military career
- Allegiance: Sweden
- Branch: Coastal Artillery (Swedish Navy)
- Service years: 1899–1941
- Rank: Lieutenant General
- Commands: Vaxholm Coastal Artillery Regiment; Vaxholm Fortress; Swedish Coastal Artillery

Lieutenant General Tor Carl Nicolaus Wahlman (10 August 1878 – 7 August 1954) was a senior officer in the Swedish Coastal Artillery. He served as commanding officer of the Swedish Coastal Artillery from 1929 to 1941.

== Early life ==
Wahlman was born on 10 August 1878 in Stockholm, Sweden, the son of Anders Wahlman, a wholesaler, and his wife Louise Klöfverskjöld.

== Career ==
Wahlman was commissioned as an officer in 1899 and was assigned to Vaxholm Artillery Corps with the rank of underlöjtnant. he was promoted to lieutenant in newly created Swedish Coastal Artillery in 1901. As a lieutenant, he served as a regimental adjutant in Vaxholm Coastal Artillery Regiment. He was promoted to captain in 1907 and as captain, he served, among other things, in the Royal Swedish Naval Materiel Administration. Wahlman was a teacher at various times at the Royal Swedish Naval Staff College between 1908 and 1927 (including weapons science in the coastal artillery program) and at the Royal Swedish Naval Academy between 1908 and 1925. Wahlman served as expert in the commission concerning the organization of the army and navy air force from 1918 to 1922.

Wahlman was promoted to major in 1920 and served as an assistant in the Artillery Department at the Royal Swedish Naval Materiel Administration. He was then posted as chief of staff of the staff of the commander of the Swedish Coastal Artillery from 1921. He was promoted to lieutenant colonel in 1924 and to colonel in 1925. Wahlman then served as regimental commander of the Vaxholm Coastal Artillery Regiment and commandant of Vaxholm Fortress in 1926. In 1929, he was promoted to major general and appointed commander of the Swedish Coastal Artillery. He was promoted to lieutenant general in 1936. In 1941, Wahlman retired from active service and was transferred to the reserve.

== Personal life ==
In December 1901, Wahlman got engage to Märta Nordlöf (1882–1935), the daughter of Karl Nordlöf and Olivia Forssberg. They married in 1905. They had one daughter: Märta (born 1908). After the death of his wife Märta, Wahlman married to Edith Johnson (born 1906) in 1939, the daughter of August Johnson and Alma Bäck.

== Death ==
Wahlman died on 7 August 1954 and was buried at Norra begravningsplatsen in Stockholm.

== Dates of rank ==
=== Army ===
- 1899 – Underlöjtnant

=== Coastal Artillery ===
- 1901 – Lieutenant
- 1907 – Captain
- 1920 – Major
- 1924 – Lieutenant colonel
- 1925 – Colonel
- 1929 – Major general
- 1936 – Lieutenant general

== Awards and decorations ==
- (Sweden) Commander Grand Cross of the Order of the Sword (14 November 1936)
- (Sweden) Knight of the Order of the Polar Star (1926)
- (Sweden) Knight of the Order of Vasa (1919)
- (Spain) 3rd Class of the Cross of Naval Merit, White Decoration (22 August 1929)

== Honours ==
- Member of the Royal Swedish Society of Naval Sciences (1920)
- Member of the Royal Swedish Academy of War Sciences (2nd Class: 1923, 1st Class: 1929)
- Honorary member of the Royal Swedish Society of Naval Sciences (1929)

== Bibliography ==
- Wahlman, Tor; Bjurner, Gunnar; Örnberg, Arthur (1919). Lärobok i artilleri för Kungl. Sjökrigsskolan. D. 1, Krutlära (in Swedish). Stockholm: Norstedt. SELIBR 2246000.
- Wahlman, Tor; Bjurner, Gunnar; Örnberg, Arthur (1920). Lärobok i artilleri för Kungl. Sjökrigsskolan. D. 2, Skjutlära (in Swedish). Stockholm: Norstedt. SELIBR 2246001.
- Wahlman, Tor; Bjurner, Gunnar; Örnberg, Arthur (1924). Lärobok i artilleri för Kungl. Sjökrigsskolan. D. 3, Materiellära (in Swedish). Stockholm: Norstedt. SELIBR 2246002.

Military offices
Preceded by Sam Bolling	Vaxholm Coastal Artillery Regiment; 1926–1929	Succeeded by Theodor Hasselgren
Preceded by Herman Wrangel	Swedish Coastal Artillery; 1929–1941	Succeeded by Hjalmar Åström
