= Vaxholm Grenadier Regiment =

- Vaxholms grenadjärregemente
- Active: 1902–1927
- Country: Sweden
- Allegiance: Swedish Armed Forces
- Branch: Swedish Army
- Type: Infantry
- Size: Regiment
- Part of: IV Army Division (1902–1927); Göta Life Guards (1928–1939)
- Garrison/HQ: Vaxholm
- Colors: Light blue
- March: "Schneidige Truppe" (Lehnhardt)

Insignia
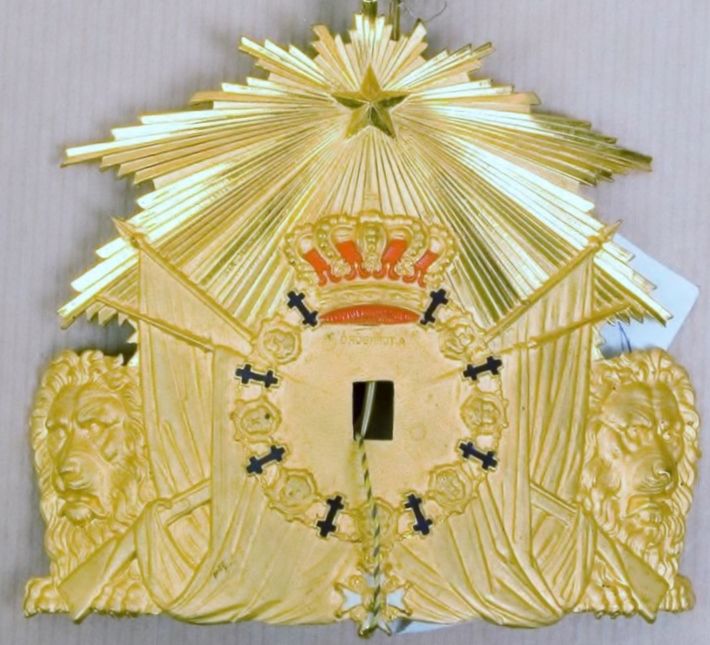
- Cap badge

Vaxholm Grenadier Regiment (Swedish: Vaxholms grenadjärregemente), also I 26, was a Swedish Army infantry regiment that was active in various forms 1902–1927. The unit was based on Rindö in Vaxholm.

== History ==
The Vaxholm Grenadier Regiment was formed in 1902 when the Värmland Rifle Corps (Värmlands fältjägarkår, No 26) and Halland Battalion (No 28) were amalgamated as proscribed in the Defence Act of 1901. The regiment would act as infantry in the Vaxholm Fortress and initially had two battalions, but was increased in the Defence Act of 1914 to three battalions. The regiment’s conscripts mainly came from the Stockholm area.

As a consequence of the Defence Act of 1925, the regiment was disbanded on 31 December 1927. However, on 1 January 1928, it was raised again as a reduced infantry battalion included in the Göta Life Guards (I 2) under the name of Göta Life Guards Fortress Battalion (I 2 V). The battalion maintained its location in Vaxholm and consisted of a battalion staff and three companies (Life Company, 2nd Company and Machine Gun Company). The battalion was under two authorities, where administration and training were under the responsibility of Göta Life Guards. For war planning and mobilization, the battalion sorted under the commandant of Vaxholm Fortress, which was an officer from the Swedish Navy. By the Defence Act of 1936, the battalion was disbanded together with Göta Life Guards on 30 September 1939.

== Barracks and training areas ==
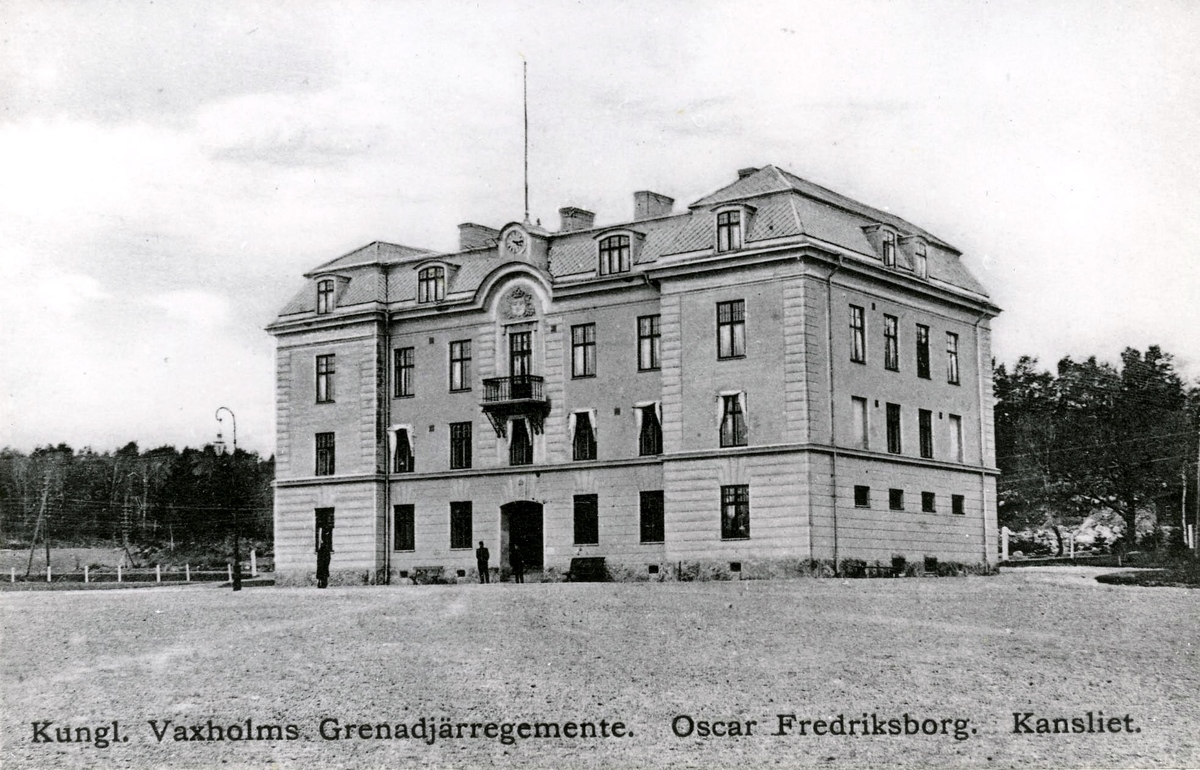
Chancellery building.

The regiment was originally placed in the Life Guards of Horse's (K 1) old barracks in Stockholm, but moved already in 1906 to Rindö east of Vaxholm. The regimental barracks for I 26 on Rindö was completed in 1907 after Erik Josephson's drawings for the Swedish infantry. In 1941, the barracks of Vaxholm Grenadier Regiment became part of Vaxholm Coastal Artillery Regiment (KA 1).

== Heraldry and traditions ==
The color of the regiment was light blue and it carried the flags of both Värmland Rifle Corps (Värmlands fältjägarkår, I 26) and Halland Battalion (No 28).

== Commanding officers ==
Regimental commanders active in the regiment 1902–1927.

- 1901–1914: Ture Wickström
- 1914–1919: Tell Schmidt
- 1919–1926: Fredrik Löwenborg
- 1926–1927: Olof Thörnell

== Names, designations and locations ==
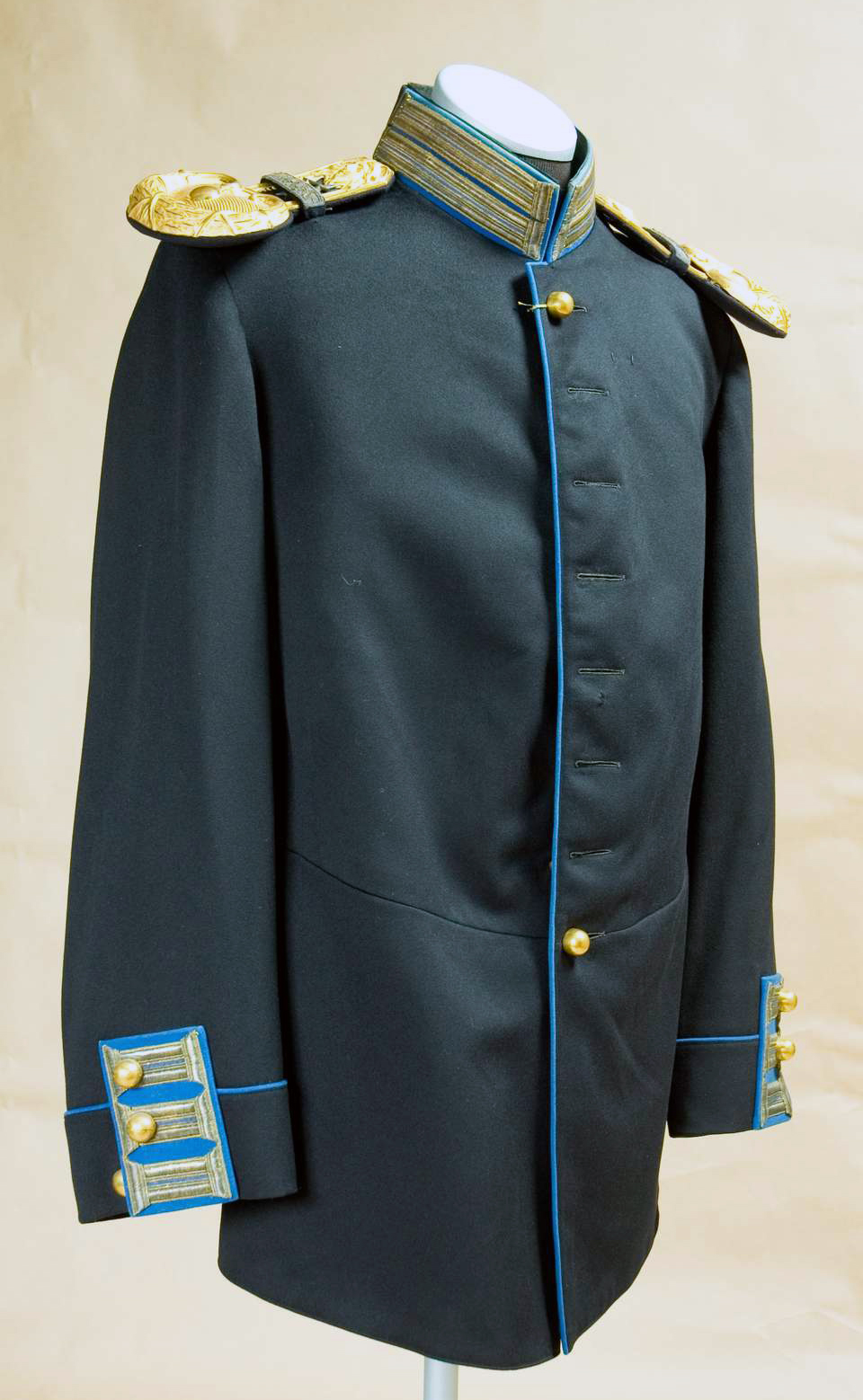
Waffenrock m/1886 for a colonel at Vaxholm Grenadier Regiment.

Name	Translation	From		To
Kungl. Vaxholms grenadjärregemente	Royal Vaxholm Grenadier Regiment	1902-01-01	–	1927-12-31
Designation		From		To
№ 26		1902-01-01	–	1914-09-30
I 26		1914-10-01	–	1927-12-31
Location		From		To
Stockholm Garrison		1902-01-01	–	1906-08-31
Vaxholm Garrison		1906-09-01	–	1927-12-31

== See also ==
- Vaxholm Artillery Corps
- Vaxholm Coastal Artillery Regiment
