= Halland Battalion =

- Hallands bataljon
- Active: 1813–1901
- Country: Sweden
- Allegiance: Swedish Armed Forces
- Branch: Swedish Army
- Type: Infantry
- Size: Battalion
- Part of: Älvsborg Regiment (1816–1835); 3rd Military District (1835–1893); 3rd Army Division (1893–1901)
- Garrison/HQ: Halmstad
- Colors: Blue
- March: "Hallands bataljons marsch" (Heimdahl) (Note: The march was adopted during the 1890s.)

Insignia
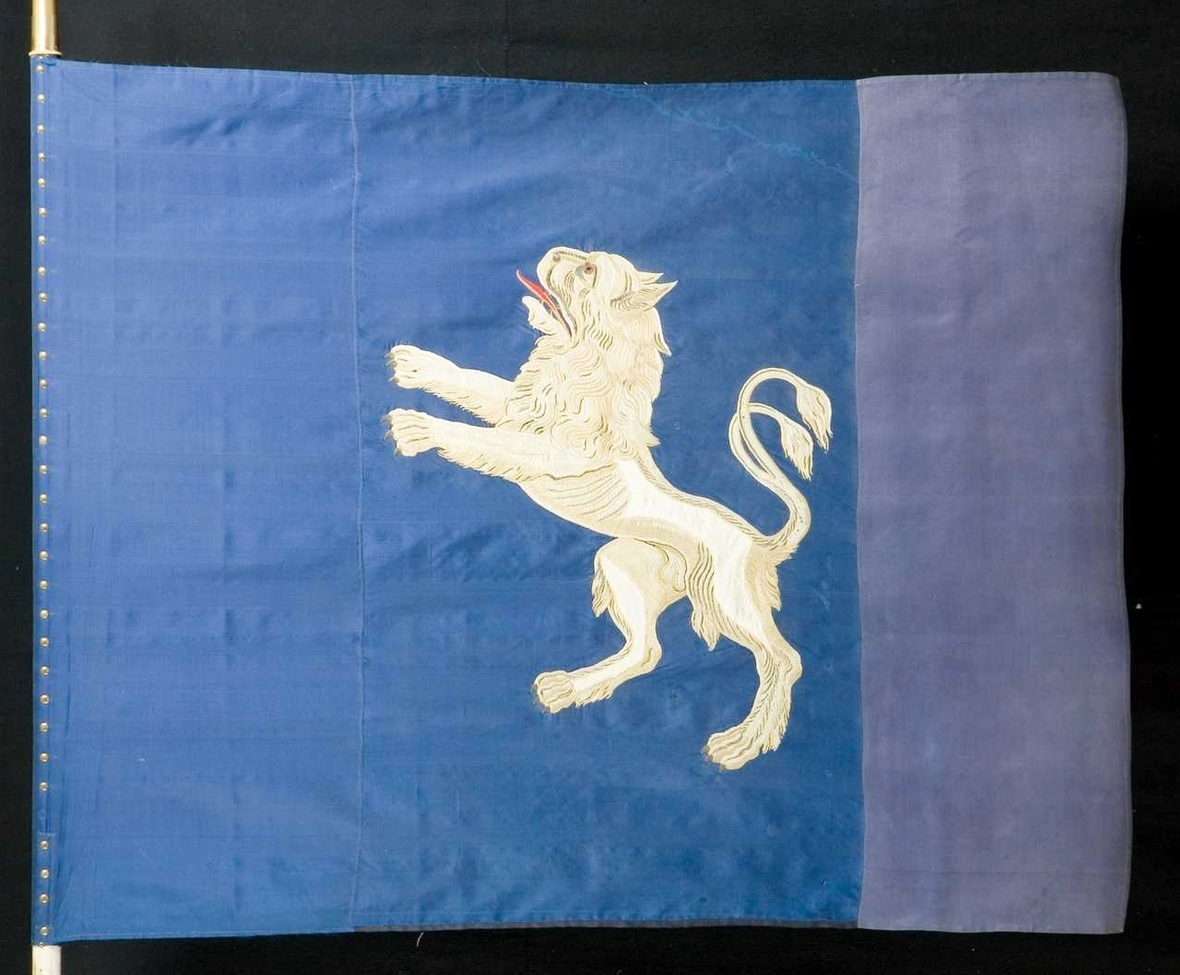
- Colour

Halland Battalion (Swedish: Hallands bataljon), designated № 28, was an infantry unit of the Swedish Army that was active in various forms from 1813 to 1901. The unit was based in Halmstad Garrison in Halmstad.

== History ==
Halland Battalion was raised on 14 May 1813, under the name of Hallands läns första infanteribataljon ("Halland County First Infantry Battalion"). From 1813 to 1835, the battalion was partly subordinated to Älvsborg Regiment. On 30 October 1818, the battalion adopted the name of Halland Infantry Battalion. In 1835, the battalion was separated from Älvsborg Regiment, and formed an independent unit. On 1 January 1887, the name Halland Battalion was adopted. On 31 December 1901, the battalion was disbanded as an independent unit, and from 1 January 1902 it was amalgamated with Värmland Rifle Corps (Värmlands fältjägarkår) and formed Vaxholm Grenadier Regiment.

== Barracks and training areas ==
When the battalion was raised in 1813, it was placed to Öster mosse (literally "Eastern bog") outside Halmstad. In 1816, the battalion was placed on the Påskberget ("Easter Mountain") in Varberg. On 22 June 1833, the battalion was placed to Galgberget in Halmstad, and on 15 April 1844 it was relocated back to Öster mosse. Between 1857 and 1901, the battalion was located in Skedalahed, about 5 km east of Halmstad. However, the regimental staff was located in Halmstad.

== Heraldry and traditions ==
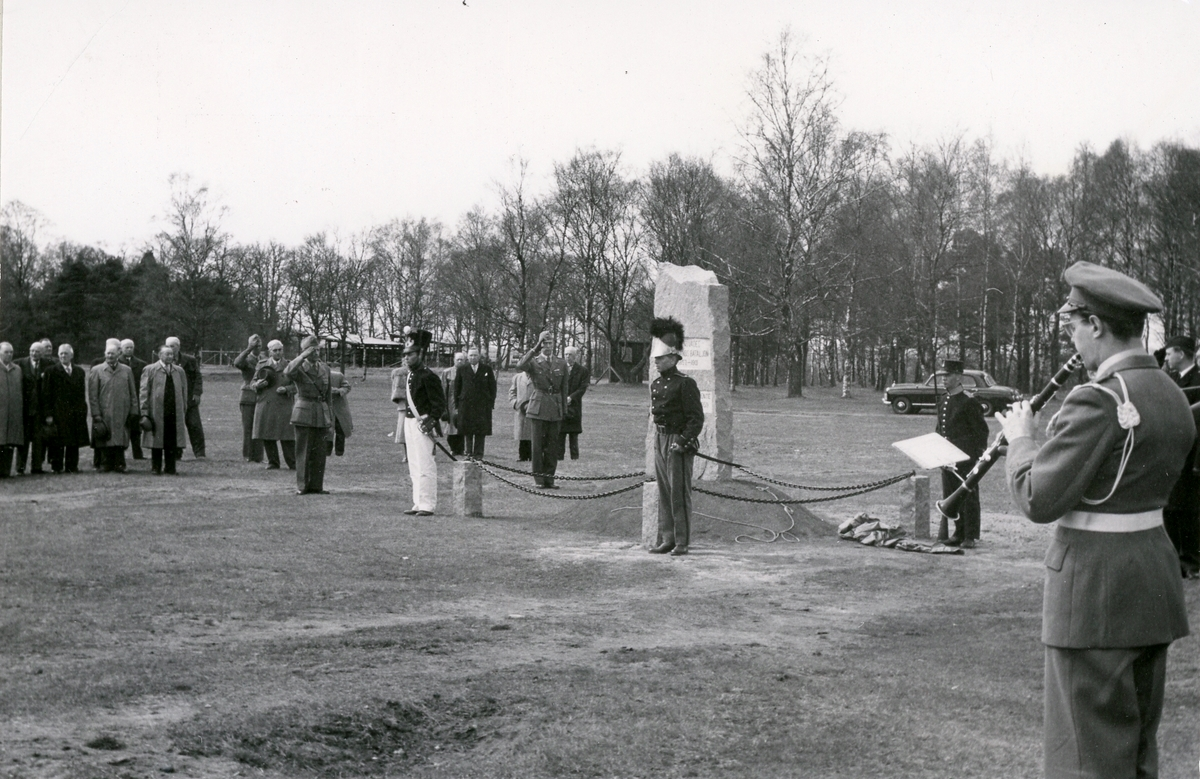
The memorial stone of Halland Battalion at Skedalahed, erected in 1959 in the presence of the commanding officer of Halland Regiment, colonel Mohlin. The stone was moved to its present location in 2000 after having previously been in the open area south of the present site. On the stone it says: "Here the Royal Halland Battalion trained during the years 1857–1901. Halland Regiment erected the memorial stone in 1959".

On 24 April 1862, the battalion was presented with a colour at a ceremony at Skedalahed. After the battalion was disbanded, Vaxholm Grenadier Regiment came to carry the colour alongside the colour of the Värmland Rifle Corps. In 1959, Halland Regiment erected a memorial stone over the battalion's time at Skedalahed. In connection with the Swedish Armed Forces leaving Skedalahed in 2000, the stone was moved to a new location.

== Commanding officers ==
- 1813–1873: ?
- 1873–1881: Helmer Falk
- 1881–1901: ?

== Names, designations and locations ==
Name	Translation	From		To
Kungl Hallands läns första infanteribataljon	Royal Halland County First Infantry Battalion	1813-05-14	–	1818-10-29
Kungl Hallands infanteribataljon	Royal Halland Infantry Battalion	1818-10-30	–	1886-12-31
Kungl Hallands bataljon	Royal Halland Battalion	1887-01-01	–	1901-12-31
Designation		From		To
№ 28		1816-10-01	–	1901-12-31
Location		From		To
Halmstad/Öster Mosse		1813-05-14	–	1816-??-??
Varberg/Påskberget		1816-??-??	–	1833-06-21
Halmstad		1833-06-22	–	1844-04-14
Halmstad		1844-04-15	–	1857-??-??
Skedalahed		1857-??-??	–	1901-12-31
