= Claes-Göran Hedén =

Swedish Coastal Artillery/Swedish Amphibious Corps officer

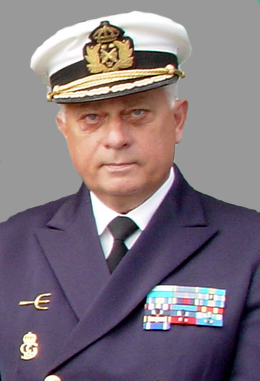
- Born: 12 October 1944 (age 82); Stockholm, Sweden
- Military career
- Allegiance: Sweden
- Branch: Amphibious Corps (Swedish Navy)
- Service years: 1967–2002
- Rank: Brigadier General
- Commands: Coastal Ranger School; Vaxholm Coastal Artillery Regiment; Härnösand Coastal Artillery Regiment; Northern Coast Marine Command; Swedish Coastal Artillery; Swedish Armed Forces International Command
- Other work: Governor of Gripsholm and Strömsholm Castle

Brigadier General Claes-Göran Hedén (born 12 October 1944) is a retired Swedish Coastal Artillery/Swedish Amphibious Corps officer. His senior commands include commanding officer of the Coastal Ranger School, Vaxholm Coastal Artillery Regiment, the Northern Coast Marine Command and the Swedish Armed Forces International Command. After retiring from the military, Hedén served as governor of Gripsholm Castle and Strömsholm Castle.

== Early life ==
Hedén was born on 12 October 1944 in Engelbrekt Parish, Stockholm, Sweden, and passed studentexamen in Stockholm in 1964.

== Career ==
Hedén graduated from the Royal Swedish Naval Academy in 1967 and was commissioned as an officer in the Vaxholm Coastal Artillery Regiment (KA 1) the same year with the rank of second lieutenant. He served as an instructor there and as platoon leader from 1967 to 1970. Hedén was promoted to lieutenant in 1969. He then served as a recruiting officer in the Naval Staff from 1970 to 1971 and as company commander at the Coastal Ranger School from 1971 to 1974. He was promoted to captain in 1972. He attended the General Course at the Swedish Armed Forces Staff College from 1974 to 1975. In 1975 he was promoted to major and from 1975 to 1976 he was a teacher of tactics at the Swedish Coast Artillery School (Kustartilleriets skjutskola, KAS), after which he attended the Staff Course at the Swedish Armed Forces Staff College from 1976 to 1978. He served in the Defence Staff from 1978 to 1980, and studied at the French Naval College from 1980 to 1981. In 1982 he was promoted to lieutenant colonel and from 1982 to 1984 he was course director at the Swedish Armed Forces Staff College, and then he was commanding officer of the Coastal Ranger School from 1985 to 1988.

Hedén served as a defense attaché at the Paris and Madrid embassies from 1988 to 1991, and he was promoted to colonel in 1990. From 1991 to 1992, he served as Chief Intelligence and Security Officer of the Middle Military District, followed by the Higher Command Course in 1992. Hedén then served as commanding officer of the Vaxholm Coast Artillery Regiment from 1992 to 1994. In 1994 he was promoted to senior colonel, then from 1994 to 1996 he was commander of the Northern Coast Marine Command (Norrlandskustens marinkommando, MKN) and the Härnösand Coastal Artillery Regiment (KA 5) and served at the Supreme Headquarters Allied Powers Europe in 1996. From 1996 to 1997 he was Inspector of the Coastal Artillery and commanding officer of the Coastal Artillery Center (Kustartillericentrum, KAC), after which he attended the Chief Course at the Swedish National Defence College in 1997. From 1997 to 2002, he was head of the Swedish Armed Forces International Command (Försvarets internationella kommando) (which in 2000 was renamed the Swedish Armed Forces Center for International Operations, Försvarsmaktens centrum för internationell verksamhet) and in 2000 he was promoted to brigadier general.

In the years 2006-2010 he was a governor of Gripsholm Castle and Strömsholm Castle. Hedén is a member (seat no 4) of the Sörmland Academy (SörmlandsAkademien), a non-profit organization, with the task to pay significant attention to efforts made by Sörmlanders, Sörmland companies and Sörmland authorities.

== Personal life ==
Claes-Göran Hedén is married to Elizabeth Hedén.

The Hedén's lived in Vaxholm until they sold their house in 2006. After living in a wing at Gripsholm Castle during his time as governor, the Hedén's moved to Lida gård in Flen Municipality in 2015.

== Dates of rank ==
- 1967 – Second lieutenant
- 1969 – Lieutenant
- 1972 – Captain
- 1975 – Major
- 1982 – Lieutenant colonel
- 1990 – Colonel
- 1994 – Senior colonel
- 2000 – Brigadier general

== Awards and decorations ==
- (Sweden) H. M. The King's Medal, 8th size gold (silver-gilt) medal worn on the chest suspended by the Order of the Seraphim ribbon (1990)
- (Norway) Commander of the Royal Norwegian Order of Merit (1 July 1993)
- (Argentina) Commander of the Order of the Liberator General San Martín (18 May 1998)

== Honours ==
- Member of the Royal Swedish Society of Naval Sciences (1986; resigned in 1999)

Military offices
Preceded by Bertil Kristensson	Vaxholm Coastal Artillery Regiment; 1992–1994	Succeeded by Håkan Syrén
Preceded by Ulf Rubarth	Northern Coast Marine Command Härnösand Coastal Artillery Regiment; 1994–1996	Succeeded by Olov Andersson
Preceded by Per Lundbeck	Inspector of the Coastal Artillery; 1996–1997	Succeeded by Stellan Fagrell
Preceded by Karlis Neretnieks	Swedish Armed Forces International Command; 1997–2002	Succeeded by Lennart Bengtsson
