= Draget Canal =

Canal in Sweden

Coordinates: 58.848962°N 17.890246°E

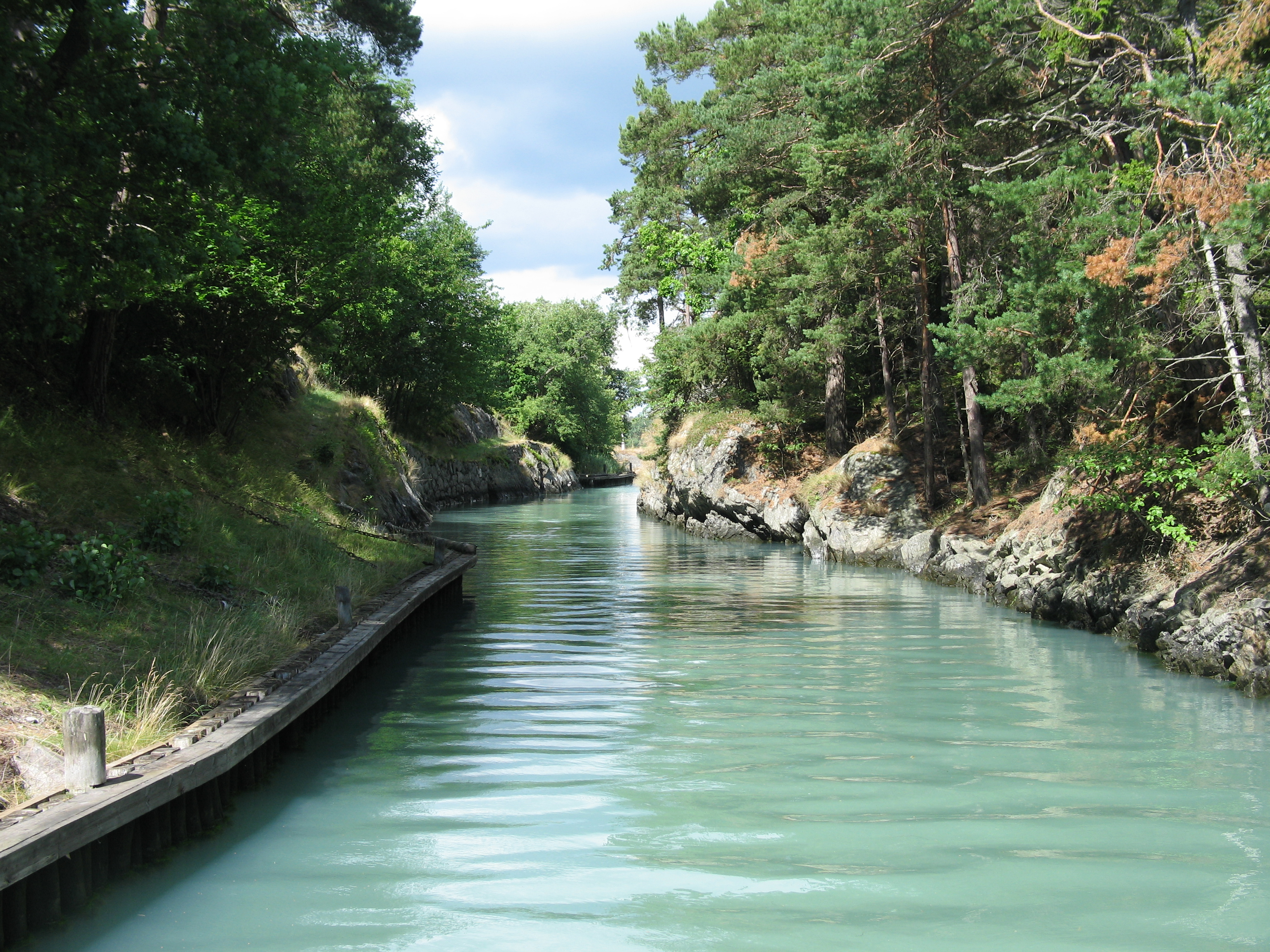

Specifications
- Locks: 0
- Status: Fully operational
- Navigation authority: Sjöfartsverket

Draget Canal (Swedish: Dragets kanal) is a Swedish canal in the municipality of Nynäshamn, county of Stockholm and province of Södermanland. Together with other natural channels, it provides a route between the ports of Nynäshamn and Södertälje avoiding the requirement to pass offshore of Landsort, although today it is only used by leisure craft.

== History ==
In the 13th century, when the water level then was three meters higher than today, Draget was a strait between the island of Järflotta and the mainland. It was passable by sailing vessels, and the passage was documented by Valdemar Sejr, who passed through the strait on the way to his crusade in Estonia. His route is mentioned in a medieval document.

In the middle of the 19th century the depth in the strait was only three decimeters (0.3 m), and Gustaf Nerman got the task to make a canal of the strait. But the canal continued to become shallower, and in the late 19th century it was necessary to dredge it further. The Swedish Navy's new torpedo boats were not so seaworthy that they could pass outside of Landsort, so the Navy straightened and deepened the canal with explosives.

== Depth ==
In the charts, the depth of the channel is noted as 1.5 meters, although signs at the ends of the canal state it is 2.0 meters. Some unconfirmed rumors suggest the canal has been passable for boats as deep as 2.2 meters.
