= Gunnar Bjurner =

Swedish Navy officer (1882–1964)

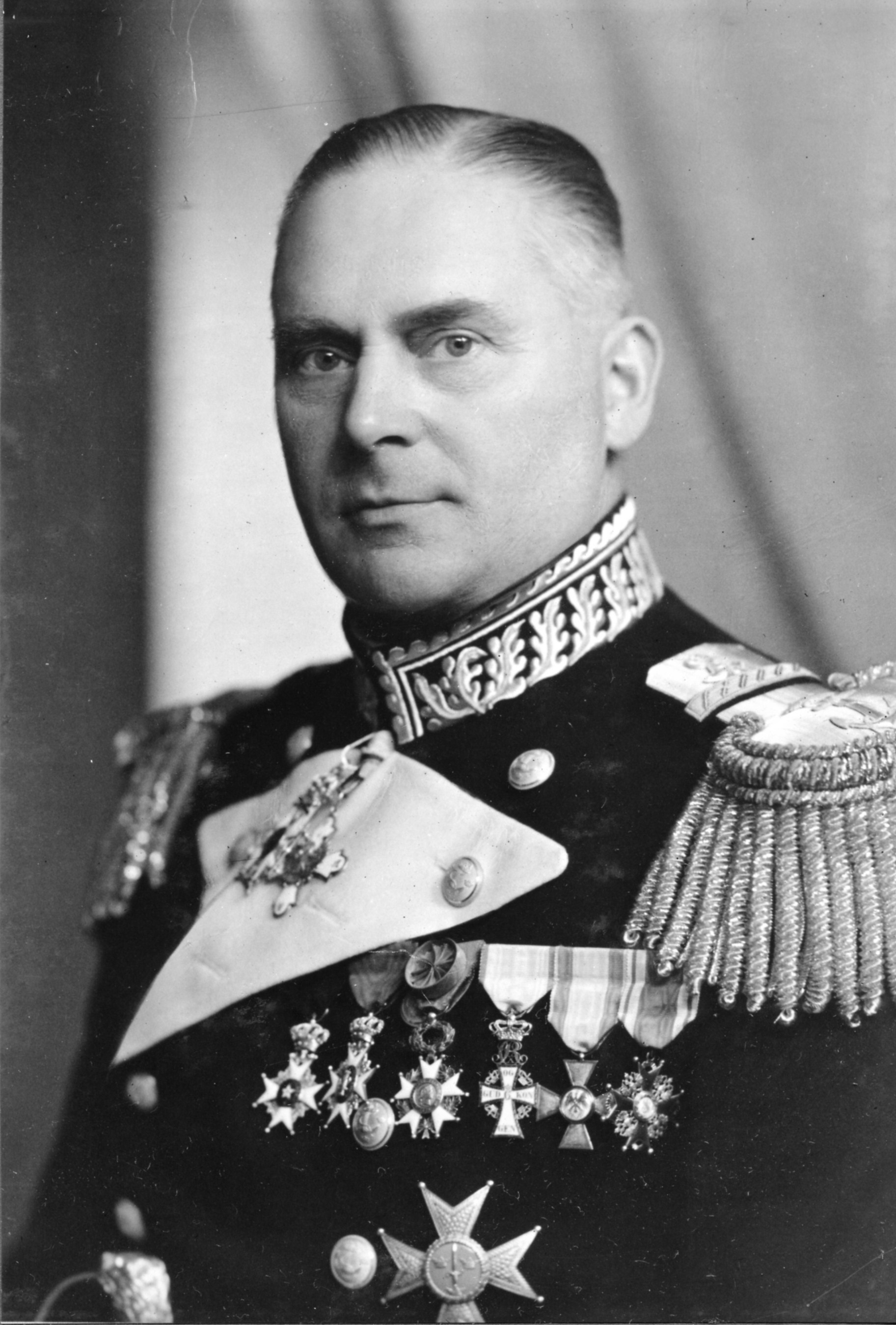
- Born: Knut Gunnar Bjurner; 10 January 1882; Stockholm, Sweden
- Died: 28 January 1964 (aged 82); Stockholm, Sweden
- Burial place: Galärvarvskyrkogården
- Military career
- Allegiance: Sweden
- Branch: Swedish Navy
- Service years: 1901–1947
- Rank: Vice Admiral
- Commands: HSwMS Dristigheten; HSwMS Sverige; HSwMS Oscar II; Karlskrona Naval Yard; Winter Squadron; South Coast Naval District; Royal Swedish Naval Materiel Administration

Knut Gunnar Bjurner (10 January 1882 – 28 January 1964) was a senior Swedish Navy officer. Bjurner commanded three different coastal defence ships, headed Karlskrona Naval Yard (1931–1936) and commanded the Winter Squadron (1933–1934) as well as the South Coast Naval District (1936–1938). Bjurner is mostly known for his work within the Royal Swedish Naval Materiel Administration, which he headed from 1938 to 1943.

== Early life ==
Bjurner was born on 10 January 1882 in Hedvig Eleonora Parish, Stockholm, Sweden, the son of Gustav Adolf Carlsson and his wife Ellen Hallström. Bjurner enrolled as a cadet at Royal Swedish Naval Academy in 1895 and was appointed at the age of 19 years to second lieutenant (underlöjtnant) in the navy in 1901.

== Career ==
Bjurner was promoted to sub-lieutenant in 1903. Richly gifted, especially in the mathematical field, he received the highest grades from the Royal Swedish Naval Staff College (1906–1908) and the Artillery and Engineering College's higher course (1908–1910). Bjurner was promoted to lieutenant in 1910. After varying positions, specialized in the field of artillery, he received commands positions within the naval artillery, among other things as an artillery officer on the coastal defence ship HSwMS Dristigheten, on which he in 1913 through a very skilled fire control conquered for the ship the much coveted King's Cup (Kungapokalen). He was promoted to lieutenant commander and appointed head of the Artillery Department in Karlskrona in 1919. Bjurner was then promoted to commander and appointed head of the Royal Swedish Naval Materiel Administration's Artillery Department in 1923.

As head of the Royal Swedish Naval Materiel Administration's Artillery Department, Bjurner got great use for his solid artillery knowledge. Based on the experiences from World War I, extensive modernisations of the warships' artillery fire-control systems were initiated through the introduction of central sight facilities and modern fire-control systems. Bjurner made efforts to develop the air defence artillery. Thus he gave the impetus for the manufacture within the country of 40 mm autocannons. After a study trip to England, among other places, he came to the realization that reliable 40 mm autocannons could not be obtained from abroad, Bjurner managed to persuade the management of AB Bofors to adopt autocannon manufacturing in their production program. The Royal Swedish Naval Materiel Administration thus ordered a test cannon, the mechanism of which would be based on the Navy's well-proven semi-automatic block mechanism, and after extensive experiments, Bofors' gun designers succeeded in solving the ammunition loading and rammer problems. The result was the later world-famous Bofors 40 mm L/70 gun.

Bjurner captained HSwMS Dristigheten, HSwMS Sverige from 1926 to 1927 and HSwMS Oscar II on a trip to the Mediterranean between 1929 and 1930. Bjurner was promoted to captain in 1931, was head of Karlskrona Naval Yard from 1931 to 1936, and commanded the Winter Squadron (Vintereskadern) from 1933 to 1934. He was promoted to rear admiral in 1936 and was appointed Commanding Admiral and station commander in Karlskrona the same year. Bjurner was then commander of the South Coast Naval District from 1937 to 1938 when he was appointed head of the Royal Swedish Naval Materiel Administration. Bjurner's time as head of the Royal Swedish Naval Materiel Administration coincided with World War II and the turbulent time immediately before the outbreak of war. Intensive work was initiated to cover the shortcomings in the navy's mobilization equipment. New shipbuilding was forced, older ships were modernized and planned mobilization productions were initiated, etc.

Bjurner also had several public assignments during his career. He was chairman of the naval officers' association and the navy's representation fund in Karlskrona, chairman of the Society for Swedish Culture Abroad's (Riksföreningen för svenskhetens bevarande i utlandet) local branch in Karlskrona from 1932 to 1938 and president of the Rotary Club in Karlskrona from 1936 to 1938. Furthermore, Bjurner was chairman of the Naval Pension Fund (Flottans pensionskassa) from 1936 to 1938, the Swedish Sailing School Association (Stiftelsen Svenska seglarskolan) in 1944 and member of the board of the Maritime Museum from 1939 to 1943. Bjurner resigned as head of the Royal Swedish Naval Materiel Administration prematurely in 1943 and served as investigator at the Ministry of Defence regarding the naval materiel from 1943 to 1945. Bjurner also assisted General Olof Thörnell in compiling a history of Sweden's defense preparedness before and during World War II. Bjurner retired in 1947 was promoted to vice admiral on the retirement list the same year.

== Personal life ==
In 1910, Bjurner married Elsa Schram (1888–1971), the daughter of Fredrik Schram and Alma Dillberg. They had one child: Gösta (born 1912).

== Death ==
Bjurner died on 28 January 1964 in Stockholm. He was interred on 30 May 1964 at Galärvarvskyrkogården in Stockholm.

== Dates of rank ==
- 1901 – Underlöjtnant
- 1903 – Sub-lieutenant
- 1910 – Lieutenant
- 1919 – Lieutenant commander
- 1923 – Commander
- 1931 – Captain
- 1936 – Rear admiral
- 1947 – Vice admiral

== Awards and decorations ==
=== Swedish ===
- (Sweden) Commander Grand Cross of the Order of the Sword (5 June 1943)
- (Sweden) Commander 1st Class of the Order of the Sword (6 June 1936)
- (Sweden) Knight 1st Class of the Order of the Sword (1922)
- (Sweden) Knight of the Order of the Polar Star (1926)
- (Sweden) Knight 1st Class of the Order of Vasa (1913)

=== Foreign ===
- (Finland) 1st Class of the Order of the Cross of Liberty with swords (between 1940 and 1942)
- Grand Officer of the Order of the Crown of Italy (between 1940 and 1942)
- (Greece) Commander of the Order of the Phoenix (between 1925 and 1931)
- (France) Officer of the Legion of Honour (between 1925 and 1931)
- (Denmark) Knight of the Order of the Dannebrog (between 1921 and 1925)
- (Kingdom of Prussia) Knight 4th Class of the Order of the Red Eagle (between 1905 and 1909)
- (Russian Empire) Knight 3rd Class of the Order of Saint Stanislaus (between 1909 and 1915)
- (Denmark) King Christian X's Liberty Medal (before 1962)

== Honours ==
- Member of the Royal Swedish Society of Naval Sciences (1915; honorary member in 1936; president 1937–1938)
- Member of the Royal Swedish Academy of War Sciences (1927)

== Bibliography ==
- Wahlman, Tor; Bjurner, Gunnar; Örnberg, Arthur (1919). Lärobok i artilleri för Kungl. Sjökrigsskolan. D. 1, Krutlära (in Swedish). Stockholm: Norstedt. SELIBR 2246000.
- Wahlman, Tor; Bjurner, Gunnar; Örnberg, Arthur (1920). Lärobok i artilleri för Kungl. Sjökrigsskolan. D. 2, Skjutlära (in Swedish). Stockholm: Norstedt. SELIBR 2246001.
- Wahlman, Tor; Bjurner, Gunnar; Örnberg, Arthur (1924). Lärobok i artilleri för Kungl. Sjökrigsskolan. D. 3, Materiellära (in Swedish). Stockholm: Norstedt. SELIBR 2246002.

Military offices
Preceded by Karl Wester	Karlskrona Naval Yard; 1931–1936	Succeeded by Nils Wijkmark
Preceded by Claës Lindsström	South Coast Naval District; 1936–1938	Succeeded by Hans Simonsson
Preceded by Harald Åkermark	Royal Swedish Naval Materiel Administration; 1938–1943	Succeeded by Erik Wetter
Professional and academic associations
Preceded by Claës Lindsström	President of the Royal Swedish Society of Naval Sciences; 1937–1938	Succeeded by Hans Simonsson
