= Härnösand Coastal Artillery Regiment =

- Härnösands kustartilleriregemente
- Active: 1943–1998
- Country: Sweden
- Allegiance: Swedish Armed Forces
- Branch: Swedish Navy
- Type: Coastal artillery
- Size: Regiment
- Part of: Ka 5 (1943–1953); MKN (1953–1957); NK (1957–1986); MKN (1986–1994); Milo N (1994–1998)
- Garrison/HQ: Härnösand
- Colors: Blue, yellow and red
- March: "General Cederschiöld" (Per Grundström) (Note: The march was adopted in 1954 and established on 10 February 1976. The march was used by the MKN from 1994 to 2000.)

Insignia
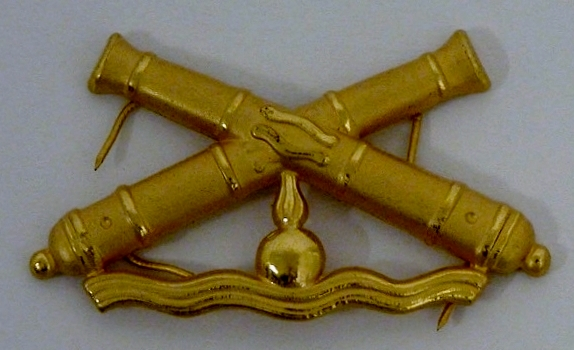
- Branch insignia

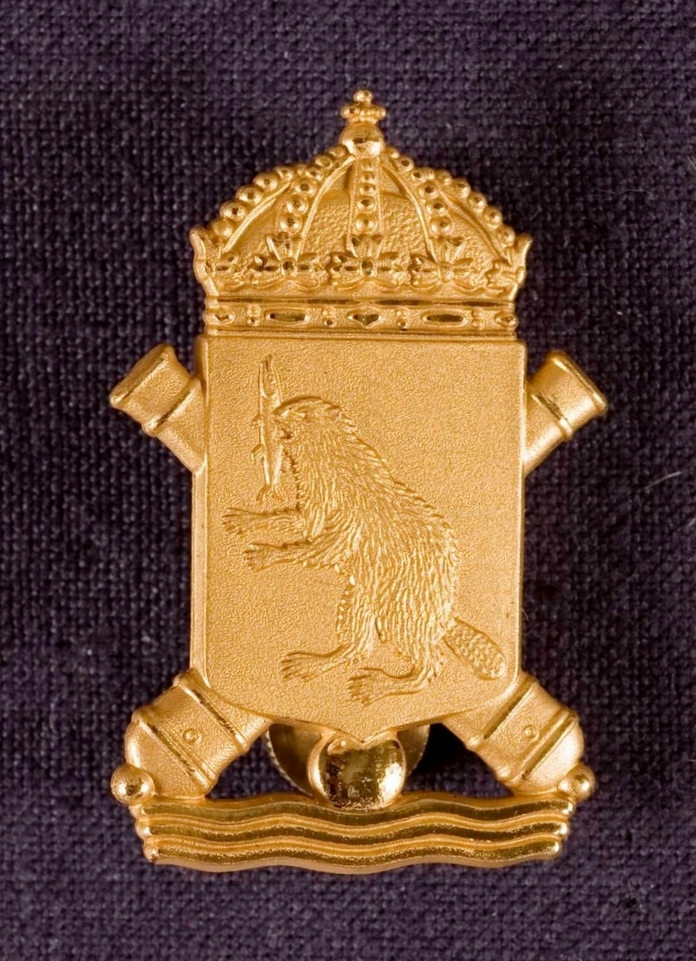
- Cap badge

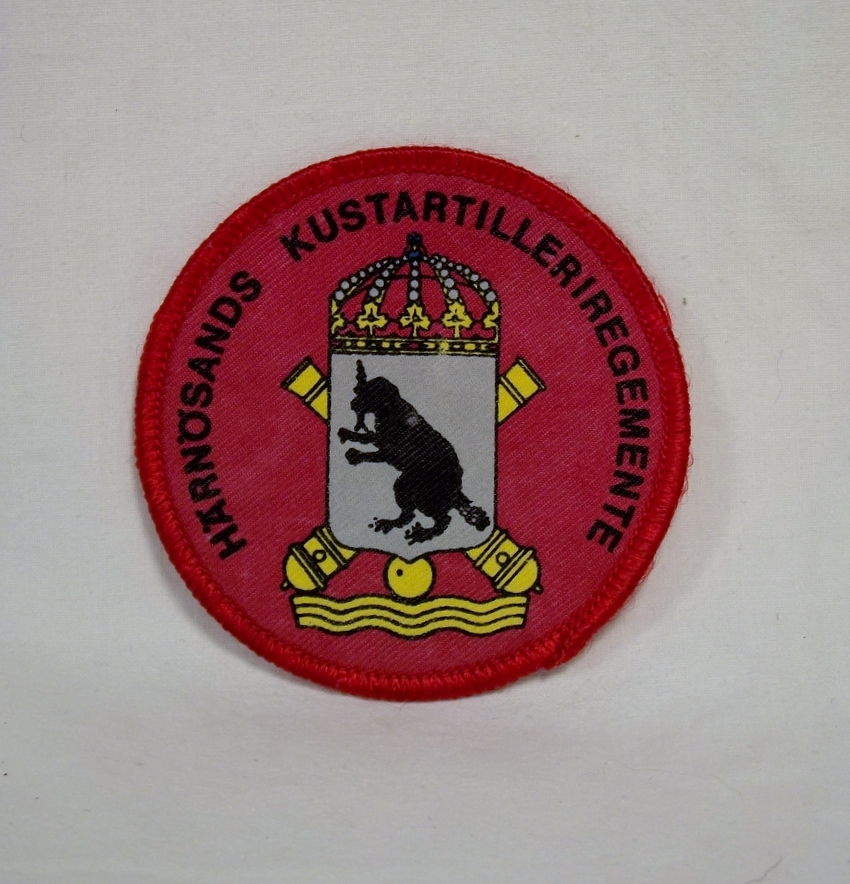
- Shoulder sleeve insignia

The Härnösand Coastal Artillery Regiment (Swedish: Härnösands kustartilleriregemente), designation KA 5, was a Swedish Navy coastal artillery regiment of the Swedish Armed Forces which operated between 1943 and 1998. The unit was based in Härnösand.

== History ==
In 1914, construction began on Hemsö Fortress. After World War I ended in 1918, the coastal artillery corps that was planned was never raised, and the newly built barracks in Härnösand was instead handed over to the health service. For a period of years, however, operations at Hemsö Fortress were strengthened by various other coastal artillery detachments. Among other things, the 12 cm batteries were manned in the mid-1930s by the 1st Company and the 6th Company from Vaxholm Coastal Artillery Regiment (KA 1). At the outbreak of World War II in 1939, 125 conscripts were transferred from Vaxholm Coastal Artillery Regiment. Two years later, another 400 conscripts and about 10 officers from Karlskrona Coastal Artillery Regiment (KA 2) were stationed on Hemsön. The Defence Act of 1942 stated that the detachment in Hemsö Fortress would replace the detached division from KA 1 and on 1 October 1943 the Defence Act would be enforced. This formed the Härnösand Coastal Artillery Detachment (KA 4 H). The designation KA 4 H did not indicate a military command relationship between the two troop units Älvsborg Coastal Artillery Regiment (KA 4) and Härnösand Coastal Artillery Detachment (KA 4 H), but only indicated that KA 4 would provide some support to the finance, machinery and craft departments.

The last round of training ended in the autumn of 1997, with the entire 6th Amphibious Battalion then fully trained. The disbandment ceremony for HMG/KA 5 was held on 14 August 1998. The ceremony began with the last acting commander of HMG/KA 5, Major Gunnar Hällgren, handing over the regimental colour to the commander of the Norrland Coast Naval Command, Senior Captain Olov Andersson. The management of the traditions of the Härnösand Marine Group (Härnösands maringrupp) with Härnösand Coastal Artillery Regiment was thus passed to the Norrland Coast Naval Command (MKN). The only military presence left on Härnön is located to the chancellery and the northern part of the barracks area.

== Location and training areas ==
When Härnösand Coastal Artillery Regiment was formed, the unit was located to Kusthöjden in northeastern Härnösand. The construction of the establishment at Kusthöjden started in 1944 after the drawings of the 1940 Military Building Investigation. On 19 June 1945, the double swallow-tailed Swedish flag was hoisted for the first time at the top of the new chancellery in Härnösand. In total, about 30 buildings were built in the area. At the end of the 1960s, an annex was built to the chancellery, after Norrland Coastal Artillery Defence with Härnösand Coastal Artillery Corps was amalgamated into a joint administrative unit. Furthermore, new buildings were also built at the garage area. After Norrland Coastal Artillery Defence was disbanded, the area was managed by the Norrland Coast Naval Command. In 2000, most of the area was sold to Vasallen, but most of the buildings still house military units and staffs.

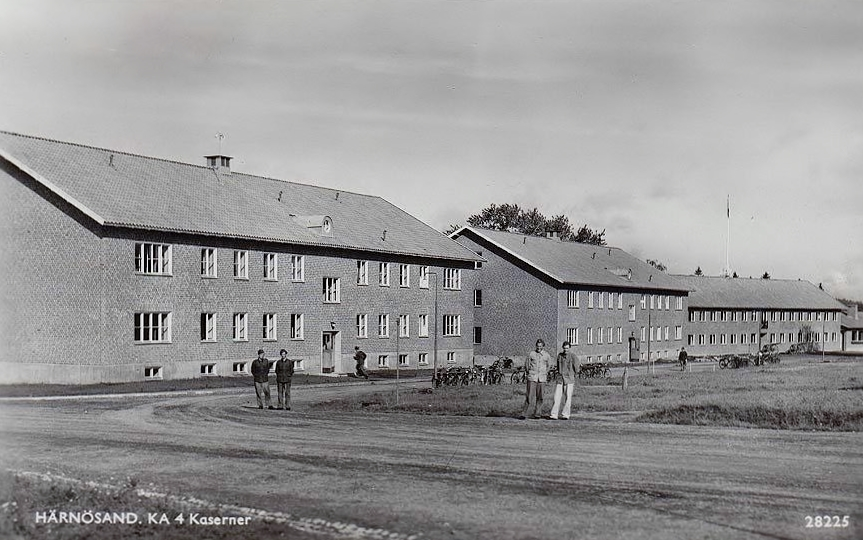
Barracks during the 1940s.

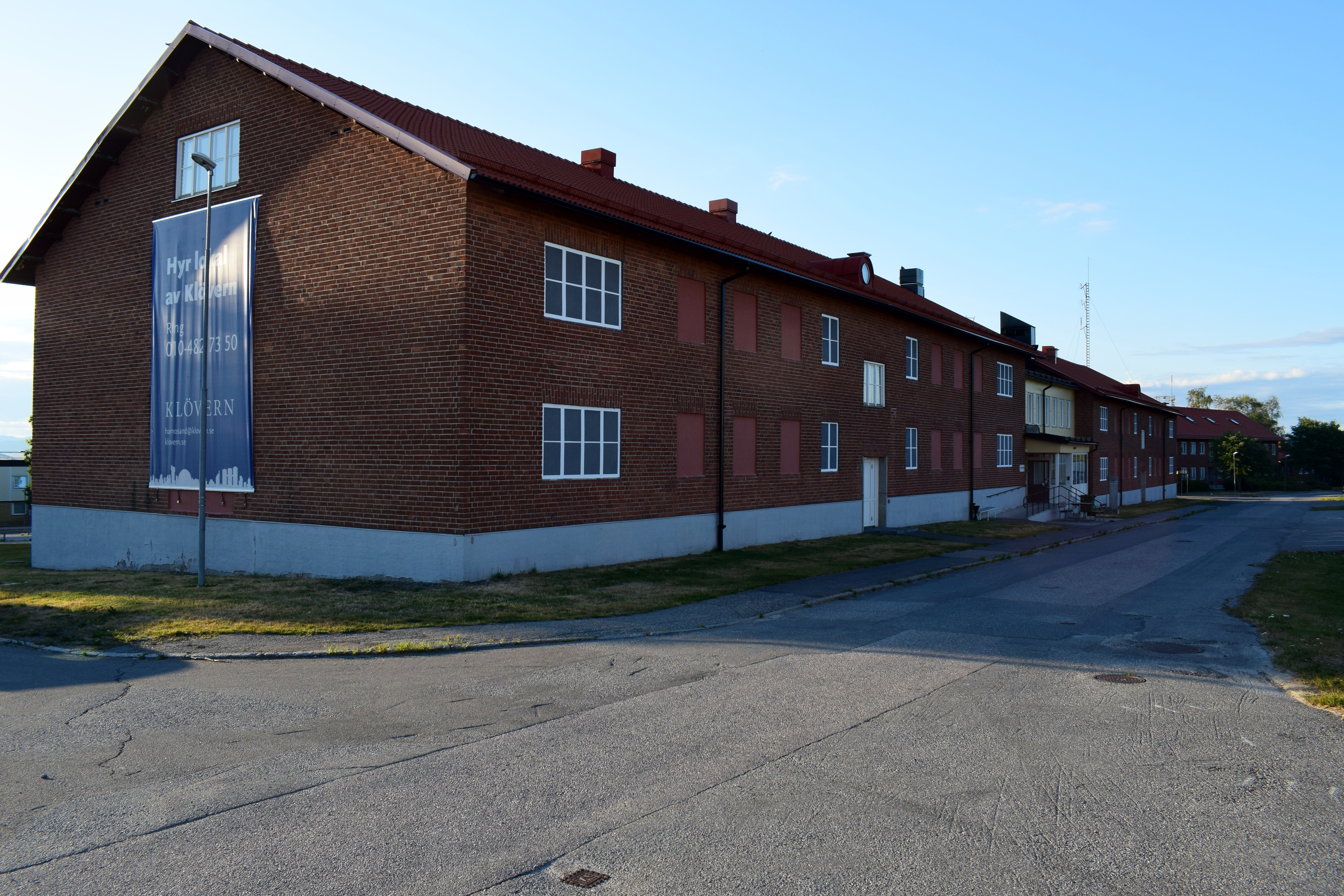
Barracks in 2018

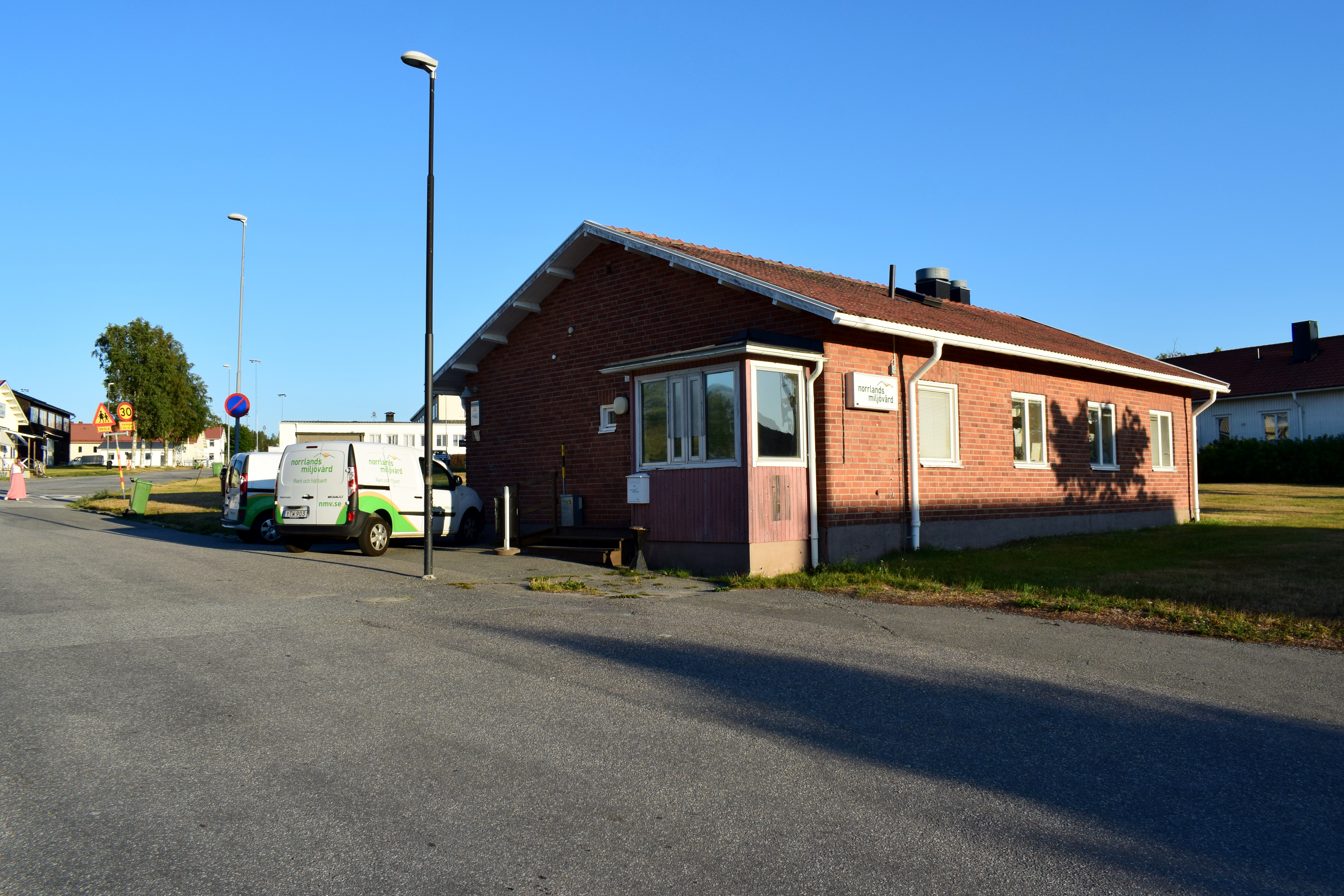
Guard house

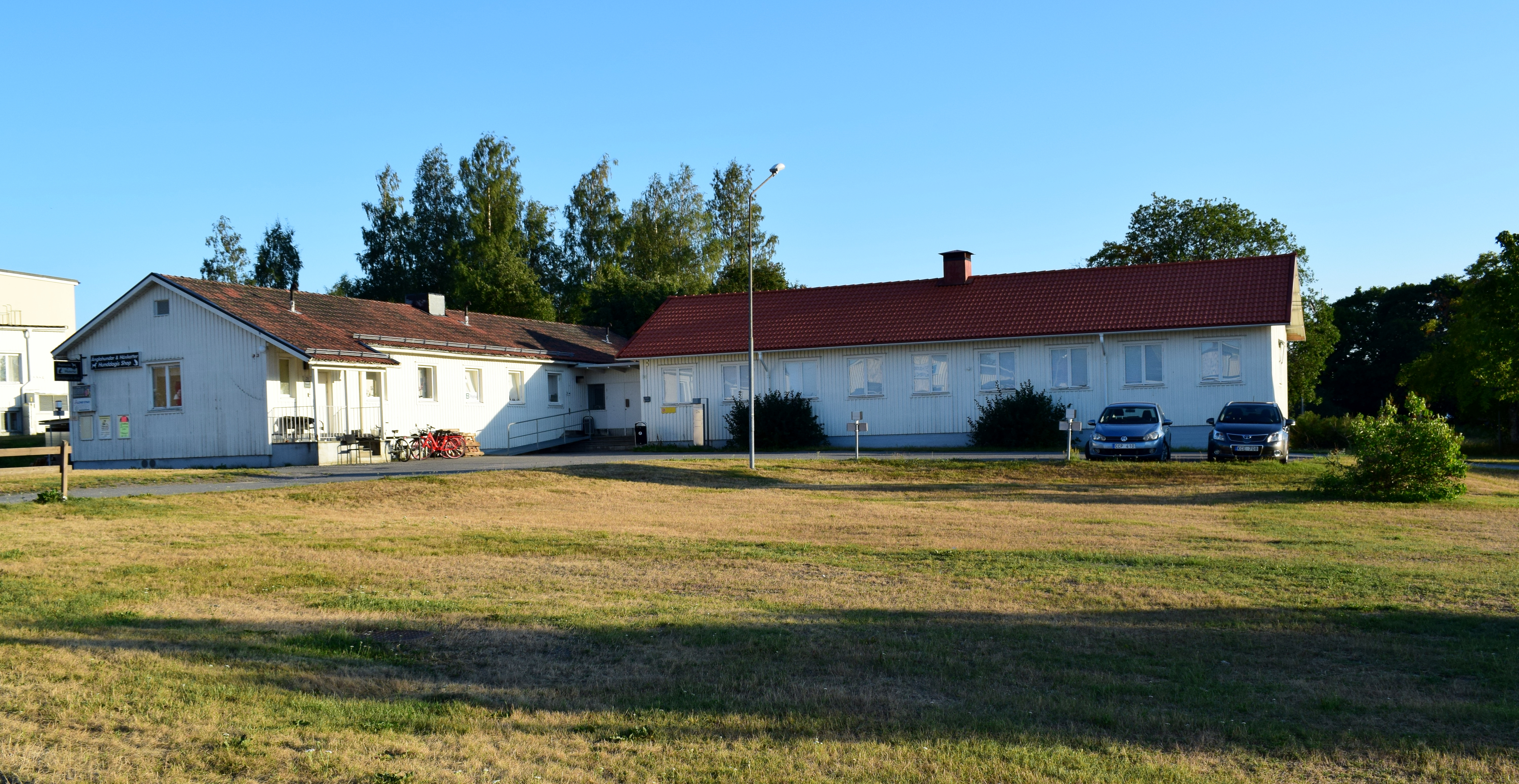
Building

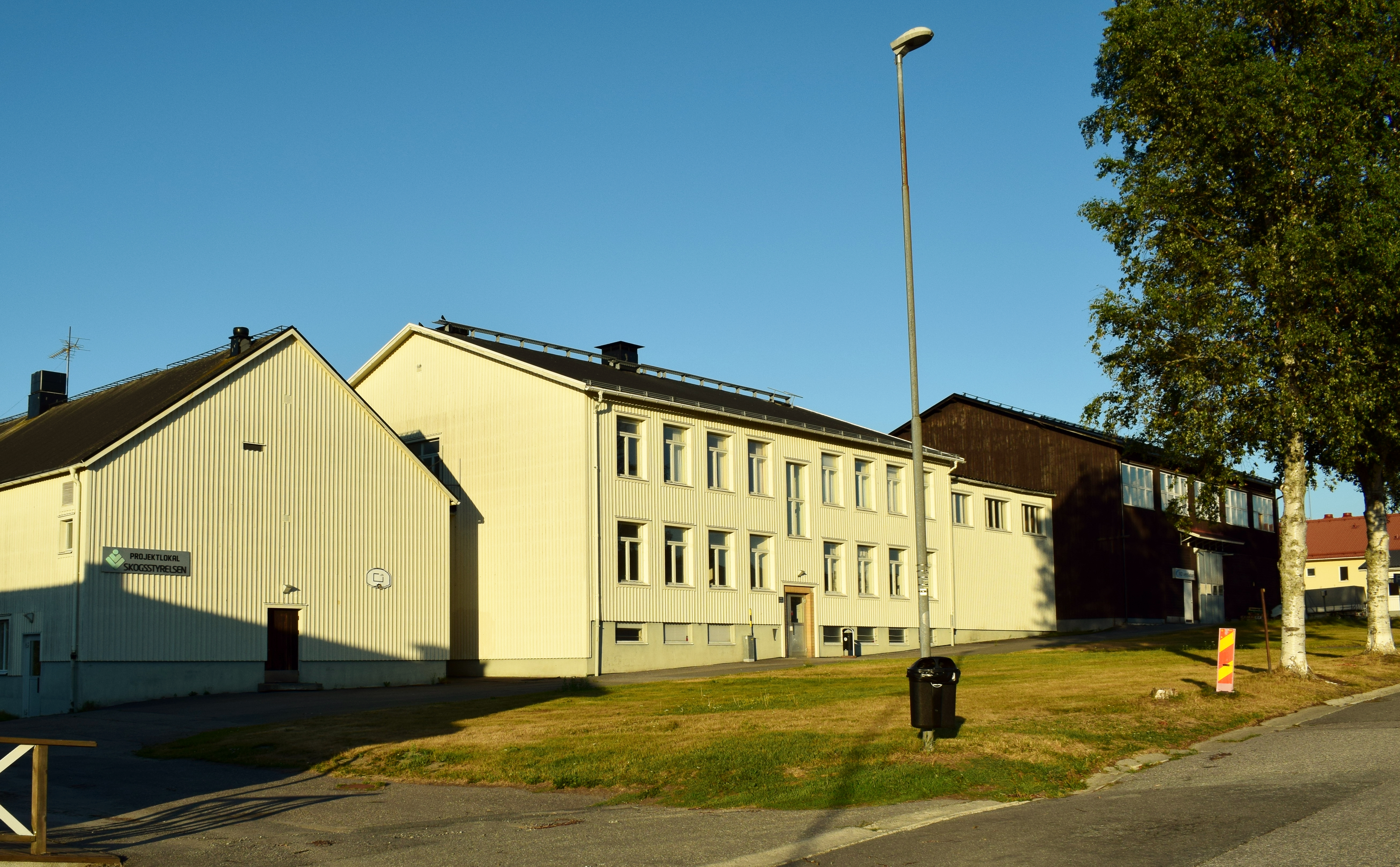
Building

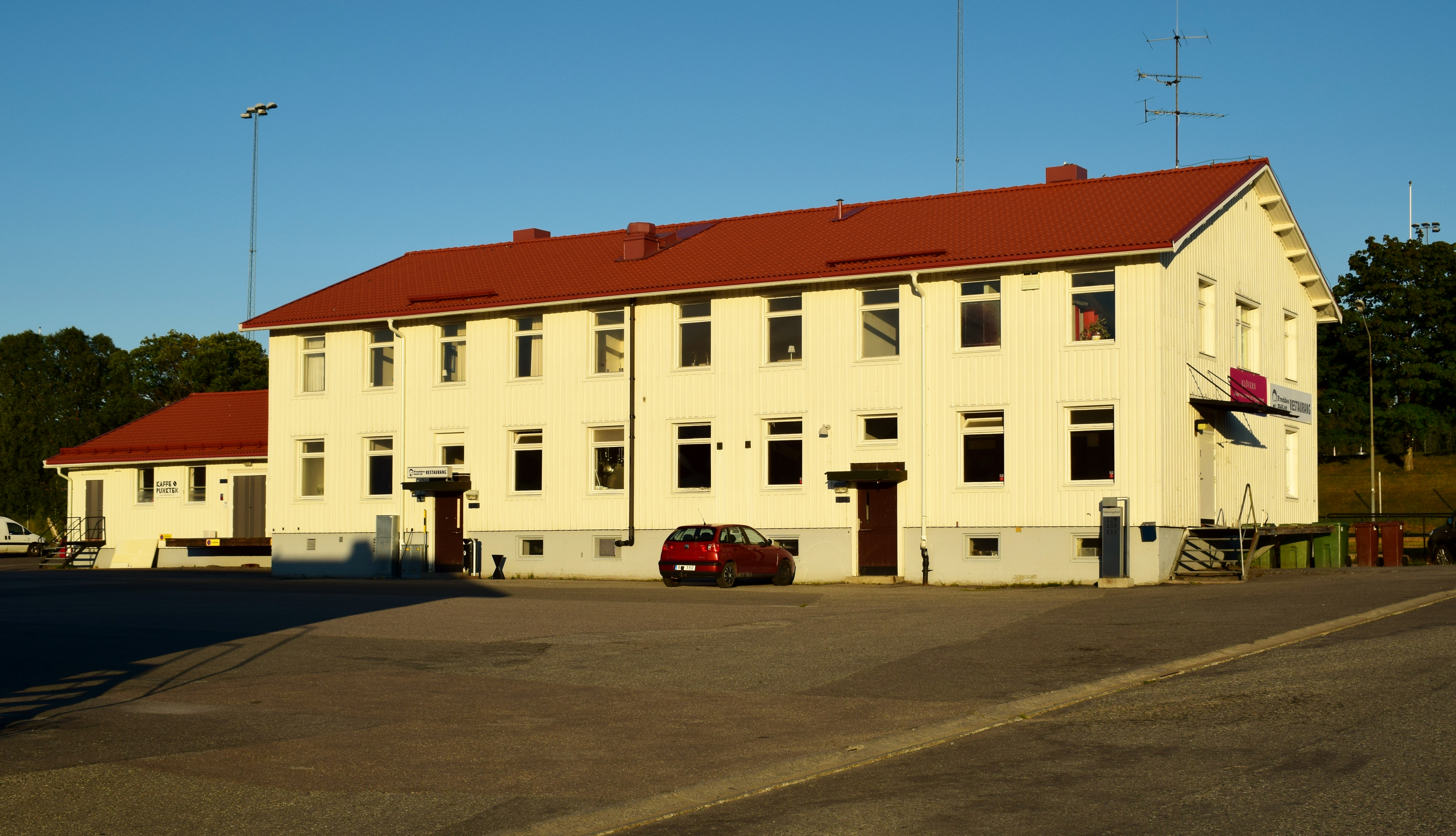
Building

== Heraldry and traditions ==
=== Coat of arms ===
The coat of arms of the Härnösand Coastal Artillery Regiment (KA 5) was used by KA 5 from 1975 to 1994, by the Norrland kustartilleriförsvar med Härnösands kustartilleriregemente (NK/KA 5) from 1975 to 1994, by the Härnösands maringrupp med Härnösands kustartilleriregemente (HMG) from 1994 to 1997 and by the Härnösandsgruppen since 1997. Blazon: "Argent, the town badge of Härnösand, a beaver, a pike in the mouth, both sable. The shield surmounted two gunbarrels of older pattern in saltire above a flaming grenade and waves".

=== Colours, standards and guidons ===
The colour of the regiment was presented to the regiment on 1 June 1945 by His Majesty the King Gustaf V at a ceremony at Stockholm Palace. It was used as regimental colour by KA 5 until 1 January 1998. The colour is drawn by Brita Grep and embroidered by hand in insertion technique probably by the company Libraria. Blazon: "On red cloth in the centre the badge of the former Coastal Artillery; two gunbarrels of older pattern in saltire under a royal crown proper and over a blazing grenade and waves, all yellow. In the first corner the town badge of Härnösand; a beaver with a pike in its mouth, all white."

=== Medals ===
In 1999, the Härnösands kustartilleriregementes (KA 5) minnesmedalj ("Härnösand Coastal Artillery Regiment (KA 5) Commemorative Medal") in silver (HärnkaregSMM) of the 8th size was established. The medal ribbon is of red moiré with a broad yellow stripe on each side.

== Commanding officers ==
Corps and regimental commanders active in Härnösand Coastal Artillery Regiment. From 1961, the unit commander was also head of the Norrland Coast Coastal Artillery Defence and from 1986 of the Norrland Coast Naval Command.

- 1942–1950: Ragnar Isaacsson
- 1950–1957: Swen Lagerberg
- 1957–1964: Stig Stade
- 1964–1966: Gunnar Eklund
- 1966–1974: Jan Beckman
- 1974–1977: Eric Jarneberg
- 1977–1981: Per-Erik Bergstrand
- 1981–1983: Lars Ahlström
- 1983–1985: Lars G. Persson
- 1985–1991: Karl-Wilhelm Hansen
- 1991–1994: Ulf Rubarth
- 1994–1996: Claes-Göran Hedén
- 1996–1998: Olov Andersson

== Names, designations and locations ==
Name	Translation	From		To
Härnösands kustartilleridetachement	Härnösand Coastal Artillery Detachment	1943-10-01	–	1953-06-30
Kungl. Härnösands kustartillerikår	Royal Härnösand Coastal Artillery Corps	1953-07-01	–	1974-12-31
Härnösands kustartillerikår	Härnösand Coastal Artillery Corps	1975-01-01	–	1975-06-30
Norrlandskustens kustartilleriförsvar med Härnösands kustartilleriregemente	Norrland Coast Coastal Artillery Defence with Härnösand Coastal Artillery Regiment	1975-07-01	–	1986-06-30
Norrlandskustens marinkommando	Norrland Coast Naval Command	1986-07-01	–	1994-06-30
Härnösands maringrupp med Härnösands kustartilleriregemente	Gothenburg Marine Group with Härnösand Coastal Artillery Regiment	1994-07-01	–	1998-08-14
Designation		From		To
KA 4H		1943-10-01	–	1953-06-30
KA 5		1953-07-01	–	1975-06-30
NK/KA 5		1975-07-01	–	1986-06-30
MKV		1986-07-01	–	1994-06-30
HMG/KA 5		1994-07-01	–	1998-08-14
Location		From		To
Kusthöjden, Härnösand Garrison		1945-06-19	–	1998-08-14

== See also ==
- List of Swedish coastal artillery regiments
