= Karlskrona Artillery Corps =

Former artillery corps of the Swedish Army (1893-1902)

- Karlskrona artillerikår
- Active: 1893–1902
- Country: Sweden
- Allegiance: Swedish Armed Forces
- Branch: Swedish Navy
- Type: Coastal artillery
- Size: Corps
- Garrison/HQ: Karlskrona
- March: "Karlskrona artillerikårs marsch" (Heimdahl)

Karlskrona Artillery Corps (Swedish: Karlskrona artillerikår) was a coastal artillery unit of the Swedish Navy which operated between 1893 and 1902. The unit was based in Karlskrona in Blekinge.

== History ==
Karlskrona Artillery Corps, intended for crew in Karlskrona's fortifications and was part of the Swedish Navy, was established in 1893 after its organization was adopted by the 1892 Riksdag. The corps consisted of four companies with a total of 360 men, enlisted to serve three years and in constant service. There were 30 officers and 28 non-commissioned officers. Every year, 500 conscripts enrolled into the corps.

In the end of 1900, the effective force of the Swedish Navy personnel was 399 officers, 143 other officers, 389 non-commissioned officers, 1,939 sailors, 440 boatmen, 200 cabin boys and 306 men of the artillery corps; sum 3,816. In addition, 18,264 conscripts, of whom 2,301 were from Karlskrona Artillery Corps. In connection with the proposal for a new military order, the establishment of a coastal artillery was proposed, which would account for both artillery and mining crew to all coastal fortifications. The proposal was passed by the Riksdag, and by Royal Decree on 1 November 1901, Vaxholm Artillery Corps and Karlskrona Artillery Corps were merged from the beginning of 1902, as well as some mining crew from the navy, into the Swedish Coastal Artillery.
