= Hjalmar Åström =

Swedish Coastal Artillery officer

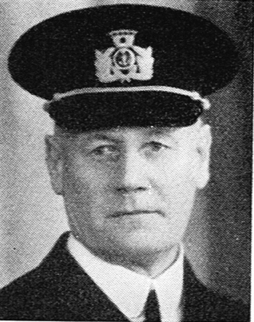
- Born: Jakob Hjalmar Åström; 22 August 1888; Uppsala, Sweden
- Died: 28 April 1957 (aged 68); Stockholm, Sweden
- Burial place: Galärvarvskyrkogården
- Military career
- Allegiance: Sweden
- Branch: Coastal Artillery (Swedish Navy)
- Service years: 1906–1953
- Rank: Lieutenant General
- Commands: Karlskrona Coastal Artillery Regiment; Inspector of the Coastal Artillery

Lieutenant General Jakob Hjalmar Åström (22 August 1888 – 28 April 1957) was a Swedish Coastal Artillery officer. Åström's senior commands include postings as commanding officer of the Karlskrona Coastal Artillery Regiment (1935–1941) and Inspector of the Swedish Coastal Artillery (1941–1953).

== Early life ==
Åström was born on 22 August 1888 in Uppsala, Sweden, the son of Per Jakob Åström, a senior enforcement officer, and his wife Lydia Humble. He passed studentexamen in 1906 and underwent legal studies.

== Career ==
Åström was commissioned as a naval officer with the rank of underlöjtnant in 1908 and was assigned to Karlskrona Coastal Artillery Regiment (KA 2), a regiment he came to belong to right up to the appointment of major general. During his career at KA 2, he held positions as regimental quartermaster, teacher at the non-commissioned officer's school, company commander and battalion commander. Åström was promoted to lieutenant in 1910 and attended the Swedish Infantry Gunnery School in 1911 and the Royal Swedish Naval Staff College from 1912 to 1913 as well as the Royal Swedish Army Staff College from 1916 to 1918. Åström was promoted to captain in 1918 and then served as adjutant in the staff of the Chief of the Swedish Coastal Artillery from 1922 to 1927, and he served as teacher at the Royal Swedish Naval Staff College from 1926 to 1927. He was promoted to major in 1931 and to lieutenant colonel in 1933, after which Åström served as chief of staff of the commandant staff at Karlskrona Fortress from 1933 to 1935. He was promoted to colonel in 1935.

Åström served as commander of Karlskrona Coastal Artillery Regiment from 17 July 1935 to 31 March 1941. During 1940 to 1941, he served as acting commander of Vaxholm Coastal Artillery Regiment. On 1 April 1941, Åström was promoted to major general and appointed Chief of the Swedish Coastal Artillery (CKA), a position which three months later was changed to Inspector of the Swedish Coastal Artillery (IKA). He played a very active part in the training of Norwegian free forces in coastal artillery service during World War II. After the end of the war, he was one of the initiators of Norwegian coastal artillery cadets being trained at the Royal Swedish Naval Academy for a number of years. In March 1953, Åström was promoted to lieutenant general and retire from active service.

== Personal life ==
In 1919, Åström married Margit Lisa Christer-Nilsson (1895–1991), the daughter of J. Anders Christer-Nilsson and Anna Engström. They had one child: Hans Christer Per Hjalmarsson Åström (1921–2000).

== Death ==
Åström died on 28 April 1957 in Stockholm. He was interred at Galärvarvskyrkogården in Stockholm on 18 May 1957.

== Dates of rank ==
- 1908 – Underlöjtnant
- 1910 – Lieutenant
- 1918 – Captain
- 1931 – Major
- 1933 – Lieutenant colonel
- 1935 – Colonel
- 1941 – Major general
- 1953 – Lieutenant general

== Awards and decorations ==
- (Sweden) Commander Grand Cross of the Order of the Sword (1948)
- (Sweden) Commander 1st Class of the Order of the Sword (6 June 1941)
- (Sweden) Knight of the Order of Vasa (1931)
- (Norway) Commander with Star of the Order of St. Olav (1 July 1948)
- (Norway) King Haakon VII Freedom Cross

== Honours ==
- Member of the Royal Swedish Academy of War Sciences (1939)
- Member of the Royal Swedish Society of Naval Sciences (4 November 1930)
- Honorary member of the Royal Swedish Society of Naval Sciences (1941)

Military offices
Preceded by Hans Gustaf Malmberg	Karlskrona Coastal Artillery Regiment; 1935–1941	Succeeded by Gösta Möller
Preceded by Tor Wahlman	Inspector of the Swedish Coastal Artillery; 1941–1953	Succeeded by Rudolf Kolmodin
