= List of Swedish coastal artillery regiments =

This is a list of Swedish coastal artillery regiments, battalions, corps and companies that have existed in the Swedish Navy.

== By unit ==
- KA 1 Vaxholm Coastal Artillery Regiment (1902–2000)
- KA 2 Karlskrona Coastal Artillery Regiment (1902–2000)
- KA 3 Gotland Coastal Artillery Regiment (1937–2000)
- KA 4 Älvsborg Coastal Artillery Regiment (1902–2000)
- KA 5 Härnösand Coastal Artillery Regiment (1953–1998)

== See also ==
- List of Swedish regiments
