= Södertörn Marine Regiment =

Coordinates: 58.84369°N 17.930975°E

- Södertörns marinregemente
- Active: 1956–2000
- Country: Sweden
- Allegiance: Swedish Armed Forces
- Branch: Swedish Navy
- Type: Coastal artillery
- Size: Coastal artillery brigade (1956–1994); Marine brigade (1994–1997); Marine regiment (1997–2000)
- Part of: KA 1 (1956–1990); Milo M (1994–2000)
- Garrison/HQ: Järflotta
- March: "På vakt vid Östersjön" (Wickström) (Note: The march was established on 13 June 1996 in TFG 960005.)

Södertörn Marine Regiment (Swedish: Södertörns marinregemente, SMR), was a Swedish Navy coastal artillery unit which operated from 1956 to 2000. The unit was based on Järflotta south of Nynäshamn.

== History ==
Södertörn Marine Regiment was raised in 1956 as the 3rd Coastal Artillery Brigade (Tredje kustartilleribrigaden, KAB 3). The brigade was then in the peace organization under the Vaxholm Coastal Artillery Regiment (KA 1), but was an independent unit in the war organization. The brigade consisted initially in the war organization of a staff at Järflotta and three barrier battalions (spärrbataljoner), Ornö, Mellsten, and Askö. On 1 July 1994, the brigade was also separated from the regiment in the peace organization and reorganized into the Södertörn Marine Brigade (Södertörns marinbrigad, SMB).

The Södertörn Group (Södertörnsgruppen) was raised on 1 July 1994 as the Södertörn Marine Brigade (SMB), along with Roslagen Marine Brigade (RMB), and as a result of that the East Coast Naval Command (MKO) was formed in 1990. This as a continuation of the integration of marine units on the lower level, including the coastal artillery brigades reorganized into marine brigades. With this, among other things, the Swedish Navy's base units and the coastal artillery's brigade service units were merged, and came to be part of the marine brigades.

On 1 January 1998, the war organization within the coastal artillery was reduced, whereby Södertörn Marine Brigade was reduced to a regiment, and got the new name Södertörn Marine Regiment (Södertörns marinregemente, SMR). The regiment was disbanded on 30 June 2000 in connection with the Defence Act of 2000.

== Units ==
=== 3rd Coastal Artillery Brigade (1956) ===
- Staff at Järflotta
- Barrier Battalion Ornö, with staff at Bodskär
  - 1x 10.5/50 battery
  - 3x light batteries
  - 2x mine obstacle units
- Barrier Battalion Mellsten, with staff at Nåttarö
  - 1x 10,5/50 batteri
  - 4x light batteries
  - 3x mine obstacle units
- Barrier Battalion Askö, with staff at Torö
  - 1x heavy battery
  - 2x light batteries
  - 1x mine obstacle unit
- 2x mobile 10.5/42 batteries
- 2x AA companies for protection of the Södertörn Base (Södertörnsbasen, SörB)
- 3x bicycle infantry battalions of the Stockholm Defence District (Fo 44)
- 3rd Archipelago Battalion of the Home Guard

=== 3rd Coastal Artillery Brigade (1984) ===
- Staff at Järflotta
- Barrier Battalion Ornö, with staff at Bodskär
  - 1x heavy battery
  - 1x light battery
  - 2x mine obstacle units
- Barrier Battalion Mellsten, with staff at Nåttarö
  - 1x heavy battery
  - 1x light battery
  - 3x mine obstacle units
- Barrier Battalion Askö, with staff at Torö
  - 1x heavy 12/70 battery
  - 1x light battery
  - 1x mine obstacle unit
- Coastal Ranger Company
- 3x bicycle infantry battalion of the Stockholm Defence District (Fo 44)
- 1x division engineer company
- defence district service company
- security companies

=== Södertörn Marine Brigade ===
- Staff at Järflotta
- Coastal Defence Battalion Askö
- Coastal Defence Battalion Mellsten
- 2nd Amphibian Battalion
- Marine Service Battalion Södertörn
- 2x defence district battalions of the Stockholm Defence District (Fo 44)
- Defence district engineer company, security companies and Home Guard units

=== Södertörn Marine Regiment ===
- Staff at Järflotta
- 2nd Amphibian Battalion
- Marine Service Battalion Södertörn
- 2x defence district battalions of the Stockholm Defence District (Fo 44)
- Defence district engineer company, security companies and Home Guard units

== Heraldry and traditions ==
=== Coat of arms ===
The coat of arms of the Södertörn Marine Brigade (SMB) 1994–1997 and Södertörn Marine Regiment (SMR) 1997–2000. Blazon: "Per pale or the provincial badge of Södermanland, a griffon segreant sableand azure an anchor surmounted two gunbarrels of older pattern in saltire, all or".

=== Heritage ===
On 1 July 2000, the Södertörn Group (Södertörnsgruppen) was raised, consisting of two battalions, Södertörn Home Guard Battalion and Roslagen Home Guard Battalion. Södertörn Home Guard Battalion was the traditional keeper of the Södertörn Marine Brigade. In 2017 (or 2018), the traditions were transferred to the Södertörn Group, this after the decision that the Home Guard battalions should bear the insignia of the 1st Marine Regiment (Amf 1) as a unit insignia. The regiment's march was inherited by the Södertörn Group, which also took over the heraldic weapon, with the difference that the weapon was laid over two crossed swords.

== Commanding officers ==
- 1956–1994: ?
- 1994–1995: COL Håkan Beskow
- 1996–2000: ?

== Names, designations and locations ==
Name	Translation	From		To
Tredje kustartilleribrigaden	3rd Coastal Artillery Brigade	1956-??-??	–	1994-06-30
Södertörns marinbrigad	Södertörn Marine Brigade	1994-07-01	–	1997-12-31
Södertörns marinregemente	Södertörn Marine Regiment	1998-01-01	–	2000-06-30
Designation		From		To
KAB 3		1956-??-??	–	1994-06-30
SMB		1994-07-01	–	1997-12-31
SMR		1998-01-01	–	2000-06-30
Location		From		To
Järflotta		1956-??-??	–	2000-06-30

== See also ==
- Roslagen Marine Regiment
- Vaxholm Coastal Artillery Regiment
