= Roslagen Marine Regiment =

Coordinates: 59.744591°N 19.079025°E

- Roslagens marinregemente
- Active: 1956–2000
- Country: Sweden
- Allegiance: Swedish Armed Forces
- Branch: Swedish Navy
- Type: Coastal artillery
- Size: Coastal artillery brigade (1956–1994); Marine brigade (1994–1997); Marine regiment (1997–2000)
- Part of: KA 1 (1956–1990); Milo M (1994–2000)
- Garrison/HQ: Hamnholmen
- March: "Honnör för Vita Gardet" (Arnoldson) (Note: The march was established on 30 June 1994.)

Roslagen Marine Regiment (Swedish: Roslagens marinregemente, RMR), was a Swedish Navy coastal artillery unit which operated between from 1956 to 2000. The unit was based at Hamnholmen in Norrtälje Municipality.

== History ==
Roslagen Marine Regiment was raised in 1956 as the 1st Coastal Artillery Brigade (Första kustartilleribrigaden, KAB 1). The brigade was then in the peace organization under the Vaxholm Coastal Artillery Regiment (KA 1), but was an independent unit in the war organization. The brigade consisted initially in the war organization of a staff at Hamnholmen and two barrier battalions (spärrbataljoner) based in Arholma and Söderarm as well as local defence battalions. In 1984, the brigade's war organization consisted of three barrier battalions, Roten, Arholma and Söderarm, and local defense battalions. On 1 July 1994, the brigade was also separated from the regiment in the peace organization and reorganized into the Roslagen Marine Brigade (Roslagens marinbrigad, RMB).

The big difference from 1994 was that the brigade was now called marine brigade. It was because the Swedish Navy's naval base service units merged with the coastal artillery's brigade service units and was now part of the marine brigades. This is a continuation of the integration of marine units on a lower level. On 1 January 1998, the war organization within the coastal artillery was reduced, whereby the Roslag Marine Brigade was reduced to a regiment, and received the new name Roslagen Marine Regiment (RMR). The regiment was disbanded on 30 June 2000 in connection with the Defence Act of 2000.

== Units ==
=== 1st Coastal Artillery Brigade (1956) ===
- Staff at Hamnholmen
- Barrier Battalion Arholma, with staff at Lidö
- Barrier Battalion Söderarm, with staff at Hamnskär
- 2x bicycle infantry battalions
- 1st Archipelago Battalion of the Home Guard

=== 1st Coastal Artillery Brigade (1984) ===
- Staff at Hamnholmen
- Barrier Battalion Roten, with staff at Singö
- Barrier Battalion Arholma, with staff at Lidö
- Barrier Battalion Söderarm, with staff at Hamnskär
- 1x defence district group staff type B
- 2x bicycle infantry battalions
- 1x division engineer company
- 1x howitzer company
- defence district service company
- security companies

=== Roslagen Marine Brigade (1994) ===
- Staff at Hamnholmen
- Coastal Defence Battalion Roten
- Coastal Defence Battalion Söderarm
- Coastal Defence Battalion Korsö
- 4th Amphibian Battalion
- Marine Service Battalion Roslagen
- Defence district battalion of the Stockholm Defence District (Fo 44)
- Defence district engineer company, security companies and Home Guard units

=== Roslagen Marine Regiment (1998) ===
- Staff
- Marine Service Battalion Roslagen
- Defence district battalion of the Stockholm Defence District (Fo 44)
- Defence district engineer company, security companies and Home Guard units

== Heraldry and traditions ==
=== Coat of arms ===
The coat of arms of the Roslagen Marine Brigade (RMB) 1994–1997 and Roslagen Marine Regiment (RMR) 1997–2000. Blazon: "Per pale or an inverted anchor sable and a zure an anchor surmounted two gunbarrels of older pattern in saltire, all or".

=== Heritage ===
On 1 July 2000, the Södertörn Group (Södertörnsgruppen) was raised, consisting of two battalions, Södertörn Home Guard Battalion and Roslagen Home Guard Battalion. Roslagen Home Guard Battalion was the traditional keeper of the Roslagen Marine Brigade. In 2017 (or 2018), the traditions were transferred to the Södertörn Group, this after the decision that the Home Guard battalions should bear the insignia of the 1st Marine Regiment (Amf 1) as a unit insignia.

== Commanding officers ==
- 1956–1994: ???
- 1994–1996: ???
- 1996–1997: COL Håkan Söderlindh
- 1998–2000: ???

== Names, designations and locations ==
Name	Translation	From		To
Första kustartilleribrigaden	1st Coastal Artillery Brigade	1956-??-??	–	1994-06-30
Roslagens marinbrigad	Roslagen Marine Brigade	1994-07-01	–	1997-12-31
Roslagens marinregemente	Roslagen Marine Regiment	1998-01-01	–	2000-06-30
Designation		From		To
KAB 1		1956-??-??	–	1994-06-30
RMB		1994-07-01	–	1997-12-31
RMR		1998-01-01	–	2000-06-30
Location		From		To
Hamnholmen		1994-07-01	–	2000-06-30

== See also ==
- Södertörn Marine Regiment
- Vaxholm Coastal Artillery Regiment
