= Vaxholm Artillery Corps =

Former artillery corps of the Swedish Army (1889-1901)

- Vaxholm artillerikår
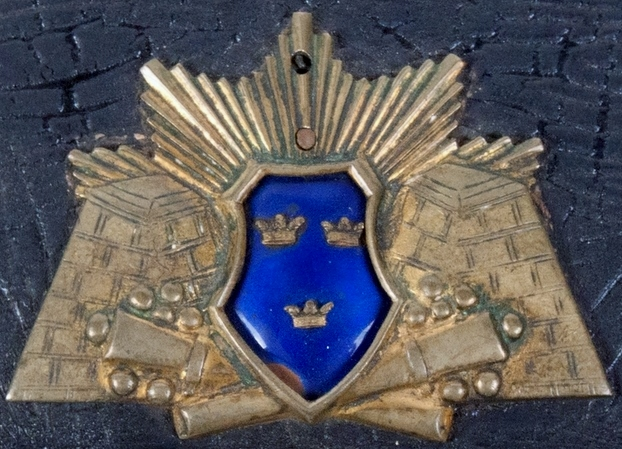
- Active: 1889–1901
- Country: Sweden
- Allegiance: Swedish Armed Forces
- Branch: Swedish Army
- Type: Artillery
- Role: Fortress artillery
- Size: Corps
- Part of: 4th Military District, 4th Division
- Garrison/HQ: Vaxholm Fortress, Oskar-Fredriksborg Fortress
- March: "Honnör för Finska gardet" (Arnoldsson)

The Vaxholm Artillery Corps (Swedish: Vaxholms artillerikår) was a corps-level artillery formation of the Swedish Army which operated between 1889 and 1901. The unit was based in Vaxholm in Uppland.

== History ==
Vaxholm Artillery Corps, the first fortress artillery corps in Sweden, originated in 1794 from a company of Svea Artillery Regiment (No 1) placed in Vaxholm, which together with the fortress company of Göta Artillery Regiment (No 2) formed Vaxholms Artillery Corps (No 5) on 1 January 1901 after a parliament decisions two years earlier. The corps was located at Vaxholm Fortress and Oskar-Fredriksborg Fortress on Rindö and consisted of 23 officers, 25 non-commissioned officer, two civilian and 400 men divided into four companies. The crew was enlisted with the addition of military men from the coast of Roslagen and Stockholm. Its commanding officer was also commandant at both fortresses, belonged to the 4th Military District and the 4th Division.

The uniforms was those for artillery, with a few modifications. The color of the collar of the atilla was red. Vaxholm Artillery Corps changed designation in 1892 to No 8 and the color of the collar became white in the design for the fortress artillery (half the collar with lace). For entry into the corps and promotion to lieutenant, similar regulations applied as for the field artillery. The crew was enlisted for 2 years, but could recapitulate. The training of underbefäl (non-commissioned officers) took place in the corps, but the officers' preparatory studies for entry into the Artillery and Engineering College was taught at Svea Artillery Regiment's school in Stockholm.

On 12 December 1901 the corps was dissolved and was terminated from the artillery, to form Vaxholm Coastal Artillery Regiment (KA 1) in the coastal artillery on 1 January 1902.

== Commanding officers ==
Commanding officers from 1888 to 1901:

- 1888–1896: Hugo Wennerholm
- 1896–1901: Oskar Sylvander

== Names, designations and locations ==
Name	Translation	From		To
Kungl. Vaxholms artillerikår	Royal Vaxholm Artillery Corps	1889-01-01	–	1901-12-31
Designation		From		To
No. 5		1889-01-01	–	1892-12-31
No. 8		1893-01-01	–	1901-12-31
Location		From		To
Vaxholm Fortress		1889-01-01	–	1901-12-31
Fredriksborg Fortress		1889-01-01	–	1901-12-31
Rindö		1889-01-01	–	1901-12-31

== See also ==
- Vaxholm Grenadier Regiment
- Vaxholm Coastal Artillery Regiment
