= Järflotta =

Järflotta Nature Reserve
- Location within Stockholm
- Location: Sweden
- Nearest city: Nynäshamn
- Coordinates: 58°50′00″N 17°55′00″E
- Area: 3,538 ha (8,740 acres)
- Established: 1968

Järflotta is an island in Stockholm archipelago, approximately 5 km (3.1 miles) south of Nynäshamn. Once separated from the mainland by a natural sound, this navigable route was rendered unusable in more modern times by post-glacial rebound and has been replaced by the artificial Draget Canal. The island is a nature reserve.

== Nature reserve ==
Järflotta is a flat island which covers about 755 ha (1,870 acres). The entire island, as well as some outlying islands, constitute a nature reserve which in total covers around 3,538 ha (8,740 acres), including water. Most of the island consists of a sandy heath and Scots pine forest. Only the central part of the island contains arable land. Unusually for Stockholm County, the island has several sandy beaches which are a habitat for a number of red listed plants. The islands surrounding Järflotta, especially Gunnarshögarna, are also included in the nature reserve and support important habitats for birds such as Caspian tern, razorbill, black guillemot and common murre. The explicit purpose of the nature reserve is to preserve an important archipelago environment and make it accessible for recreation and, for the outlying islands, to protect the bird-life. Parts of the nature reserve belongs to the EU-wide Natura 2000-network.

== Coastal artillery battery ==
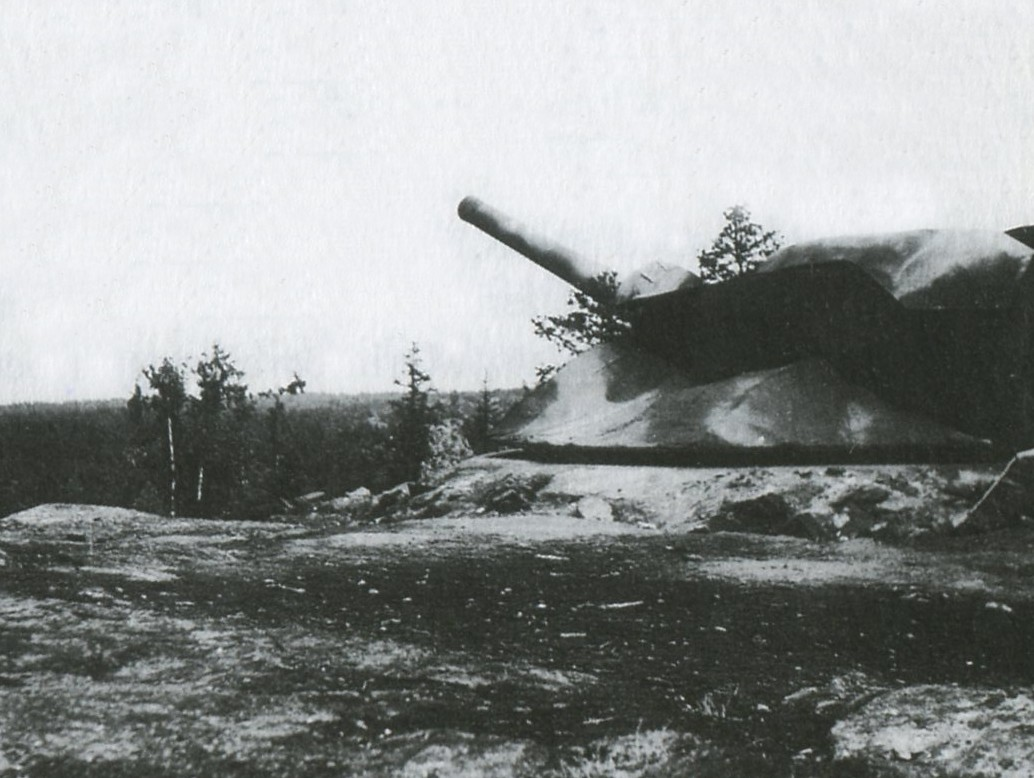
The coastal artillery battery in 1943

Parts of a former coastal artillery battery, which now consists of a single 9.4in (24cm 43calibre) Bofors M06 naval gun, are still present on Järflotta. The site was decommissioned during the 1990s, and today is preserved as a protected historical building. The 9.4in gun is believed to be the largest caliber preserved in Sweden.

The coastal artillery battery, which dates from 1942, is part of a series of fortifications built during World War II to protect Södertälje and Nynäshamn from attack and minefields in the Baltic Sea. The battery originally consisted of three guns that were relocated to Järflotta from a fortification in Vaxholm. Barbed wire and a total of 291 concrete bunkers defended the site from direct assault. When the battery was deemed fit for action in 1943 it was manned by 605 personnel. After the war, the battery remained part of Swedish defensive planning during the Cold War. As late as 1954, it was used in exercises simulating seaborne attacks by the Soviet Navy. In 1948, nine people died in an explosion at the gun battery while handling ammunition. Whether the cause was the result of sabotage or mishandling of the ammunition has never been clarified. Although the coastal battery ceased as an artillery platform in the 1950s, it remained in military use until it was decommissioned in the 1990s.
