= Sam Rydberg =

Swedish composer (1885–1956)

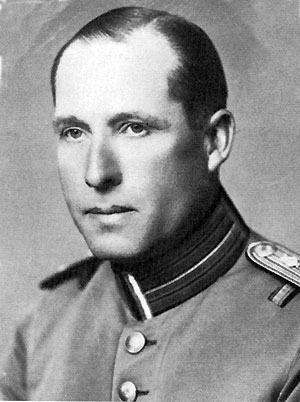
Sam Rydberg

Sam Hjalmar Rydberg (27 October 1885 – 25 March 1956) was a Swedish composer.

== Biography ==
Sam Rydberg was born in Nyköping, Sweden, in 1885. He started as a military musician at age 13 as a drummer at the Södermanland Regiment. After that he became a part of the military band of the Svea Engineer Corps 1906-1935 and after 1928 as the head of the band. The instrument he played was soprano cornet.

He composed many types of music but is most known for his marches. He is also the composer that has most marches that is official marches of regiments in the Swedish Armed Forces and is sometimes referred as the Swedish march king.

== List of marches ==
- I flaggskrud (Norrbottens pansarbataljon) 1933
- Till Fronten (Karlsborgs luftvärnsregementes marsch) 1915
- Ikaros Marsch (Arméns fältarbetsskola)
- På vakt (Svea ingenjörregemente) 1944?
- På post för Sverige (Öresunds marindistrikt) 1944
- På marsch (Norra skånska (infanteri-)regementet / Södra militärområdet) 1944?
- Under Fredsfanan (Försvarets internationella centrum) 1939
- Den Svenske Unterofficeren (Arméns kompaniofficersskola / Arméns tekniska centrum) 1916
- Vivu Esperanto! (Minvapnet) 1933
- I Beredskap (Älvsborgs kustartilleriregement / Göteborgs marinbrigad) 1939
- För fosterlandet (Kustartilleriets stridsskola)
- Avanti per Patria (Flottans sjömansskolas marsch / Karlskronas örlogskolors)
- Nordiska spelen (Bråvalla flygflottilj) - alternative title: Formering till tåg
- I täten 1922
- Tre Kronor 1951
- Konsertmarsch Nr 3 (Konsertmarsch à la Italiano) 1920
- Landstormsmarsch 1914
- Konsertmarsch Nr 2 - Italia
- I fält (Västra arméfördelningen)
- Till Laxön
- Defiladmarsch (Södra underhållsregementet)
- Leve Fortifikationen! 1914
- The hockeyman 1915
- Jubileumsmarsch Stockholm 700 (Jubileumsmarsch, S:t Erik) 1953
- Till vårt försvar 1942
- Till bivacken 1918
- Friska viljor
- Kronprins Leopold (Till prinsessan Astrids giftermål) 1926
- Under förbimarsch 1936
- Sailor Boys
- Marsch för Svea Ingenjörskår 1955
- Överste Thorsell 1914
- American Style 1936
- Unga Örnar
- Trav (marsch) (trot march)
- Till "Zinkens"
- Till stadion! 1946
- Svenska färger 1916
- Stockholms Blåsorkester (marsch) - Alternative titles: Skarpskyttemarsch, AIK-orkestern, AIK-marsch, Infanterimarsch 1920
- Stockholm
- Sportmarsch 1945
- Skolmarsch
- Sjökrigsskolekadetten
- Scouting
- På manöver 1916
- Olympiska spelen
- Obligationsmarsch 1914
- Militärmarsch 1915
- Liten konsertmarsch tillägnad Sven Sköld 1945
- Leve översten!
- Krigsskolekadetten
- Kosmopolit, konsertmarsch 1937
- Kavallerimarsch 1922
- Kamplust
- Italia, Marcia rapsodia di Bonelli (Not No. 18 again) 1913
- Idrottskamrater
- I slutna led 1924
- Högalidspojkar
- Honnörsmarsch
- För hem och härd
- Fortifikationens honnörsmarsch 1927
- Flygarmarsch
- Bland kamrater 1913
- Armémarsch 1917
- Vårt luftvärn (Luftvärnets officershögskola)
- Gardeskamrater (Vaxholms kustartilleriregementes marsch)

== Literature ==
- Stolt, Lars C. (1975). ”Sam Rydberg — Sveriges marschkung”. Marschnytt (34): sid. 5-9.
