= Gotland Coastal Artillery Regiment =

- Gotlands kustartilleriregemente
- Active: 1937–2000
- Country: Sweden
- Allegiance: Swedish Armed Forces
- Branch: Swedish Navy
- Type: Coastal artillery
- Size: Regiment
- Part of: MDG (1937–1942); VII. milo (1942–1960); MKG (1960–1994); Milo M (1994–2000)
- Garrison/HQ: Fårösund
- Colors: Red and yellow
- March: "Nordergutarna" (Åke Dohlin) (Note: The march was adopted in 1958 and established on 13 June 1996.)

Insignia
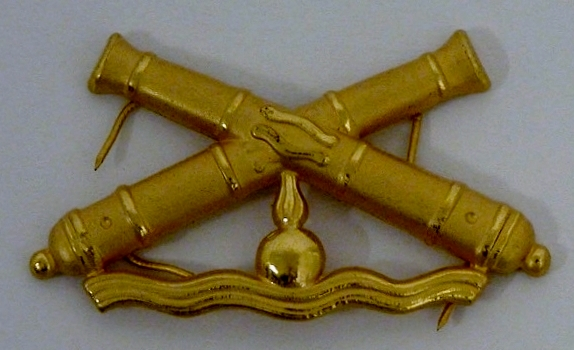
- Branch insignia

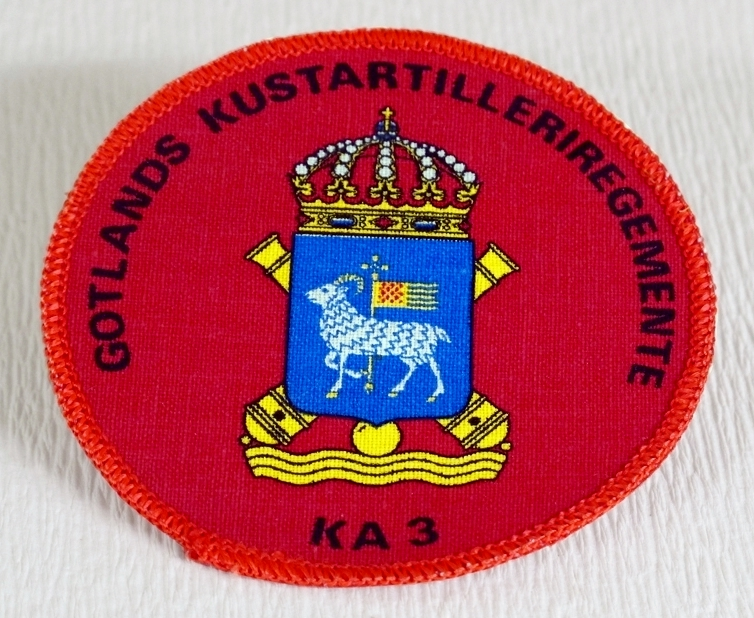
- Shoulder sleeve insignia

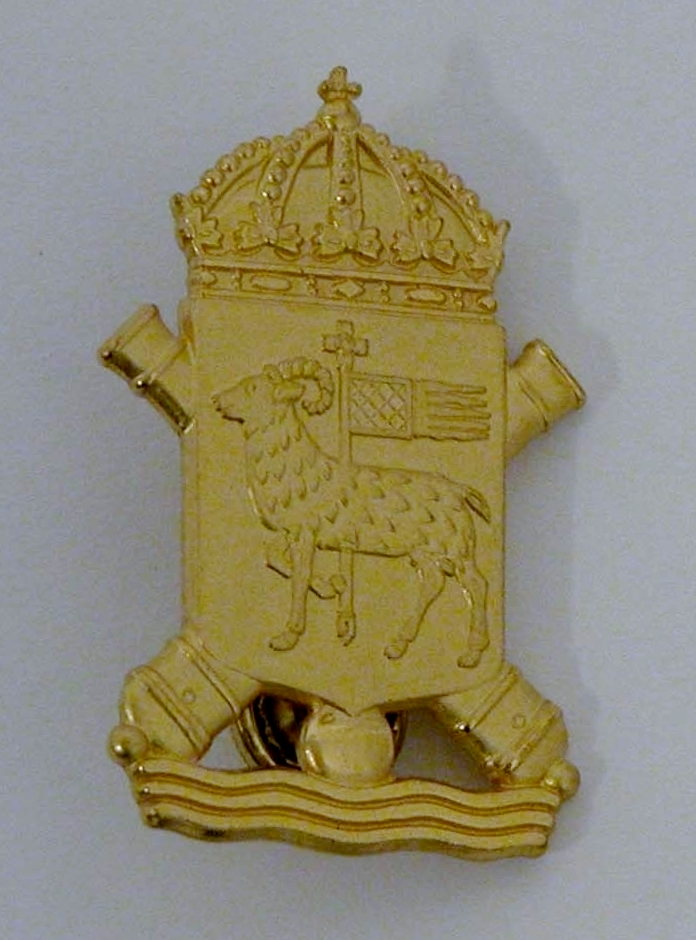
- Cap badge

The Gotland Coastal Artillery Regiment (Swedish: Gotlands kustartilleriregemente), designation KA 3, was a Swedish Navy coastal artillery regiment of the Swedish Armed Forces which operated between 1937 and 2000. The unit was based in Fårösund in Gotland.

== History ==
The military presence in the areas around northern Gotland began in connection with the Crimean War. Fårösund became a strategically important place. English and French fleets used the sound as a base, stage station and observation point during the war against Russia. In 1885 there was a new concern between Russia and England. New ships were expected. Both Russia and Germany demanded that Fårösund be fortified if the Swedish neutrality was to be recognized and respected. It was the start of the Swedish Coastal Artillery, which was established in the early 1900s. The Swedish Armed Forces bought land and buildings and hired people. In 1885 work began on fortifications in Slite and Fårösund where artillerymen from Gotland National Conscription and Göta Artillery Regiment were brought. The facility and its crew had varying names: Flottans batterier och minpositioner i Fårösund ("Navy's Batteries and Mine Positions in Fårösund") and Fårösunds kustartilleriposition och Fårösunds kustartilleridetachement ("Fårösund Coastal Position and Fårösund Coastal Artillery Detachment"). In 1919 the facility was disbanded.

Through the Defence Act of 1936, the Riksdag decided that a new coastal artillery unit would be raised and based in Fårösund. The 1930 Defense Commission proposed that the unit be called Fårösund Coastal Artillery Corps. When the unit was raised on 1 July 1937, however, it was named Gotland Coastal Artillery Corps (KA 3). Four companies under the command of a major were organized. The entire area was 110 hectares. On 6 June 1939, at 08:00 in the morning, the flag was raised in front of the chancellery for the first time. In December of the same year, the coastal artillery was mobilized and the force was about 1,000 men. In May 1938, the Riksdag decided that SEK 669,000 would be allocated to the construction of service housing at Gotland Coastal Artillery Corps in Fårösund. Through the Defence Act of 1948, a new organization was established in 1949 for the Swedish Coastal Artillery. For Gotland Coastal Artillery Corps, the new organization meant that the training of air defense guns was transferred to the newly formed air defense forces within the Swedish Army.

On 1 April 1960 in a letters patent, it was decided that Gotland Coastal Artillery Defense and Gotland Coastal Artillery Corps from 1 July 1961 were to have a joint commanding officer and joint staff and administrative bodies during peace time.

Prior to the Defence Act of 2000, the Swedish Government proposed that the future basic organization should contain two coastal artillery units where one of the two coastal artillery units would constitute a main unit, where the government considered that Vaxholm Coastal Artillery Regiment and the 1st Coastal Artillery Brigade (KA 1) would constitute the main unit. The reason for the fact that the unit had a very good proximity to the Stockholm archipelago, with practice and training areas with designed terrain types. None of the other regiments were considered to have terrain conditions and infrastructure to constitute a main unit. Which regiment that would remain besides KA 1, stood between Karlskrona Coastal Artillery Regiment and the 2nd Coastal Artillery Brigade (KA 2), Gotland Coastal Artillery Regiment (KA 3) and Älvsborg Coastal Artillery Regiment (KA 4). KA 3, however, quickly fell away in the process, as the operations was considered limited and that the unit lacked sufficient and appropriate training areas. Regarding KA 4, it was also considered to have limited exercise conditions. KA 2 was considered to have the best conditions for acting as a second unit alongside KA 1. However, the Government considered that it was of great importance that Gothenburg, as Sweden's second biggest city, also had a military presence. Furthermore, the Government considered retaining KA 4 as giving the Swedish Navy the opportunity to continue operations for the naval warfare units in Gothenburg. Hence, the government tried to keep KA 1 and KA 4 in the new basic organization.

Through the Defence Act of 2000, it was decided at the same time that the Swedish Coastal Artillery would be disbanded and the remaining units would have a different focus. Hence, the Government considered that the units would be called amphibious regiments (or marine regiments), and that the service branch would be changed from the Swedish Coastal Artillery to the Swedish Amphibious Corps. Hence, Vaxholm Coastal Artillery Regiment and the 1st Coastal Artillery Brigade (KA 1) and Älvsborg Coastal Artillery Regiment (KA 4) came to be disbanded as coastal artillery units on 30 June 2000. On 1 July 2000, the amphibian unit Vaxholm Amphibian Regiment (Amf 1) and Älvsborg Amphibian Regiment (Amf 4) were formed in its place.

The Gotland Coastal Artillery Regiment, together with Karlskrona Coastal Artillery Regiment, were the two units that were disbanded last of all the units that were disbanded through the Defence Act of 2000, when the others were disbanded on 30 June 2000. The fact that the two regiments were disbanded so late was due to the fact that they completed the basic education of the last round of conscripts. From 1 November 2000, the operations were transferred to a decommissioning organization, until the disbandment would be completed no later than 31 December 2001. The decommissioning organization was in turn dissolved on 30 June 2001, when the disbandment of the unit was considered completed.

== Operations ==
During 1994/1995, the Fårösund Marine Brigade (FMB) trained its first amphibious company (with green beret). In February, they were given the honorary assignment to be the honor guard at the launch of the submarine Gotland. The company's main armament was Robot 17 and naval mines were assigned, but, despite the name, had no sea transport. During 1996/1997, the first archipelago rifle company that were assigned the Bandvagn 206 (on trial) and 12.7 mm machine guns. On 30 September 2000, the last conscripts in the regiment were discharged.

== Units ==
=== 1937 Peacetime Organisation ===
The organization in 1937 consisted of the following:

- 1st Company, fixed naval artillery
- 2nd Company, fixed anti-aircraft artillery
- 5th Company, mobile naval artillery
- 8th Company, naval mine, signal and boat service. At the 8th Company financial and assistance personnel were also placed.

In the late 1940s, the name of the companies changed to:

- 3rd Company, heavy naval artillery
- 14th Company, anti-aircraft and light naval artillery, naval mine, signal and boat service.

=== 1949 War Organisation ===
The VII Military District's 1949 War Organisation for GK/KA 3:

- Staff + tank platoon (5 x Stridsvagn m/37)
- Barrier Battalion TG:
  - 3 x 15 cm gun m/98-36
  - 4 x 57 mm Battery Vialms (VA), at Notviken in the northern inlet to the Fårösund basin)
  - AA section (40 + 20 mm)
- Barrier Battalion BN:
  - 3 x 15 cm gun m/98-36
  - 3 x 57 mm Battery Hällrevet (HR), at the southern inlet to the Fårösund basin at Bungenäs Peninsula)
  - 3 x 57 mm Battery Österklint (ÖK), at the southern inlet to the Fårösund basin at Bungenäs Peninsula)
  - 2 x 57 mm Battery Kalkbruket (KB), at the western shore of Bungenäs)
  - AA section (40 + 20 mm)
- Barrier Battalion SE:
  - 3 x (later 5) 12 cm gun m/94
  - 4 x 57 mm Battery Asunden (AN), at Asunden outside Slite)
  - AA section (40 + 20 mm)
- Battery Hultungs (HG), at Hultungs gård, southeast of Bunge Church):
  - 3 x 21 cm gun m/98
  - AA section (40 + 20 mm)
- Battery Bläse (BL), in Bläse at the northern shore of Kappelshamnsviken)
  - 4 x 57 mm gun m/89B
- 7th Coastal Artillery Battery:
  - 3 x 15,2 cm gun m/37
  - AA section (40 + 20 mm), mobile
- 1st Anti-Aircraft Battery:
  - 3 x 7,5 cm anti-aircraft gun m/36, fixed
- aid station etc.
- depot

== Barracks and training areas ==
The Gotland Coastal Artillery Regiment was based in Fårösund, about 55 km north of Visby. Initially, in 1904, a warehouse was rebuilt into a barracks. During the years 1939-1944, the majority of the barracks area was built which constituted the Fårösund Garrison. During the 1980s, among other things, a school building was added. In 2000, the government decided that the garrison area with airfield (Bunge Airfield) should be listed. Four disbanded regiments in Sweden have received this legal protection. Thus, KA 3 became a national cultural heritage. After the disbandment, the state administration company Vasallen took over the area, with the task of selling or renting the premises to entrepreneurs. Among other things, there is today a film studio, Kustateljén, where a number of well-known Swedish films have been recorded. On 15 January 2018, the Swedish Fortifications Agency entered into an acquisition agreement with Fastighets AB Bunge Kronhagen, with the purchase of the naval port in Fårösund for SEK 20 million. On 30 April 2018, the naval port of Fårösund was transferred to state property, which included the three properties Gotland Bunge Kronhagen 3:69, Bunge Kronhagen 3:70 and Bunge Kronhagen 3:71.

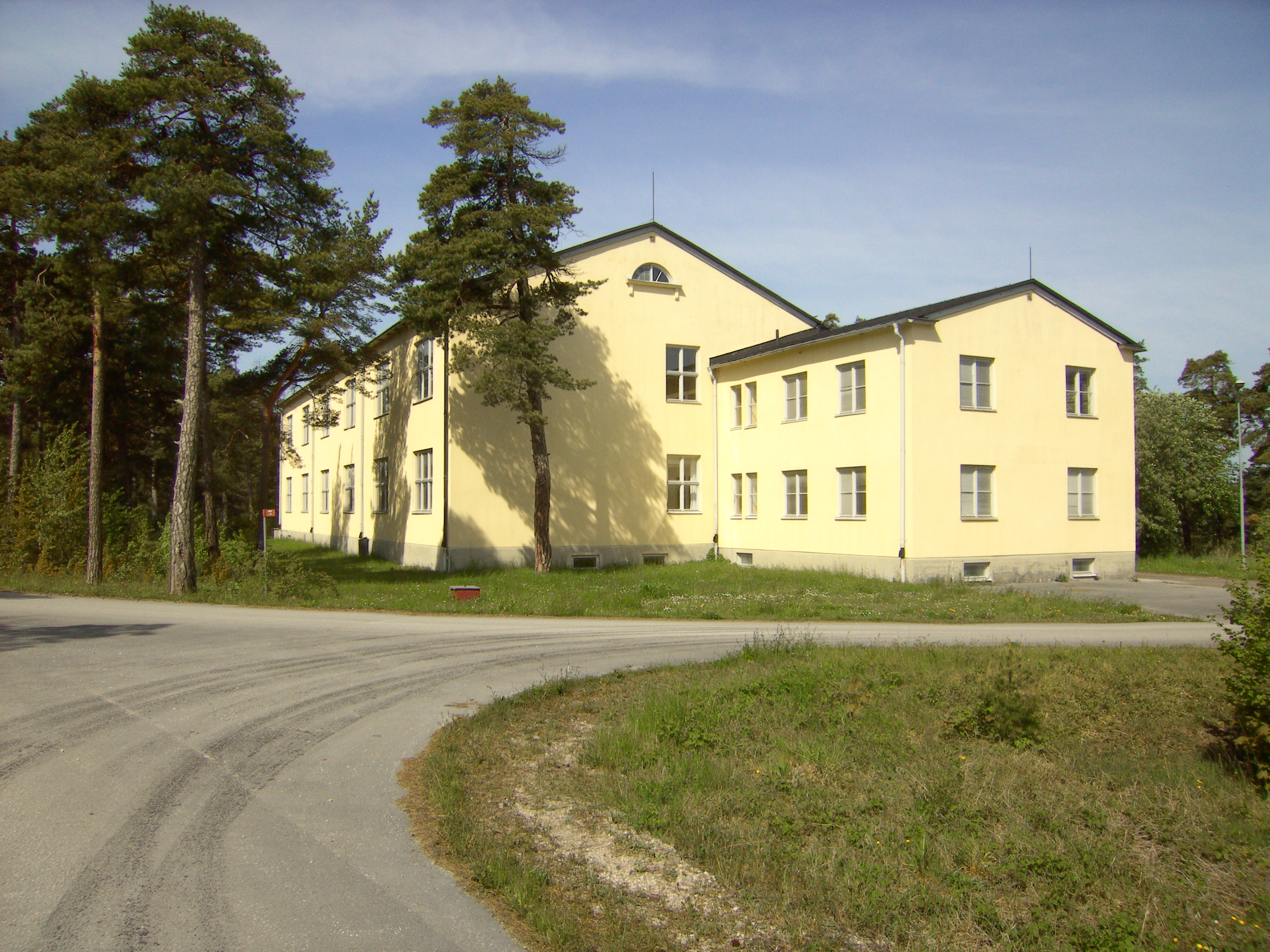
Barracks Ankaret ("Anchor")

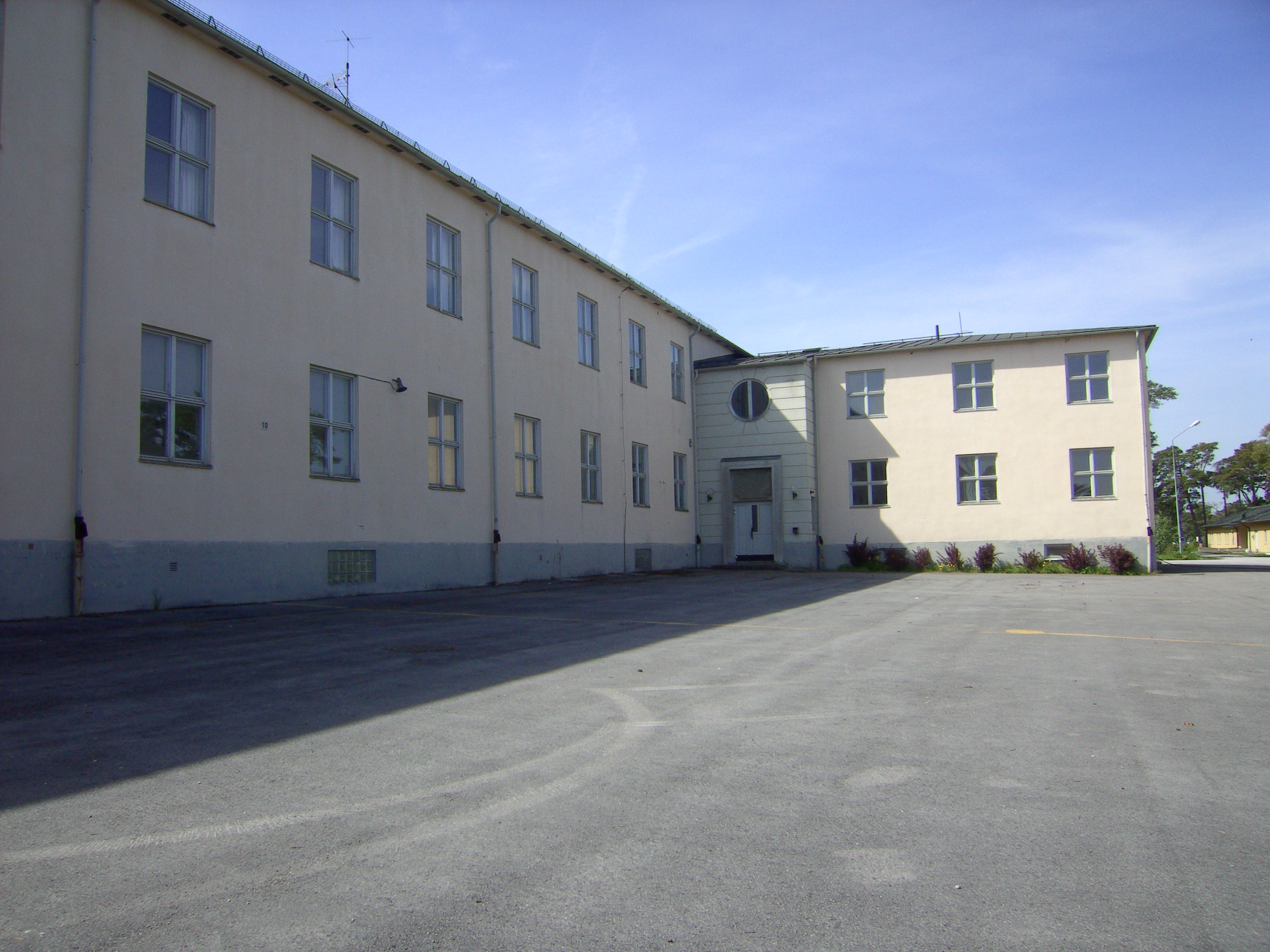
Barracks Kanonen ("Cannon")

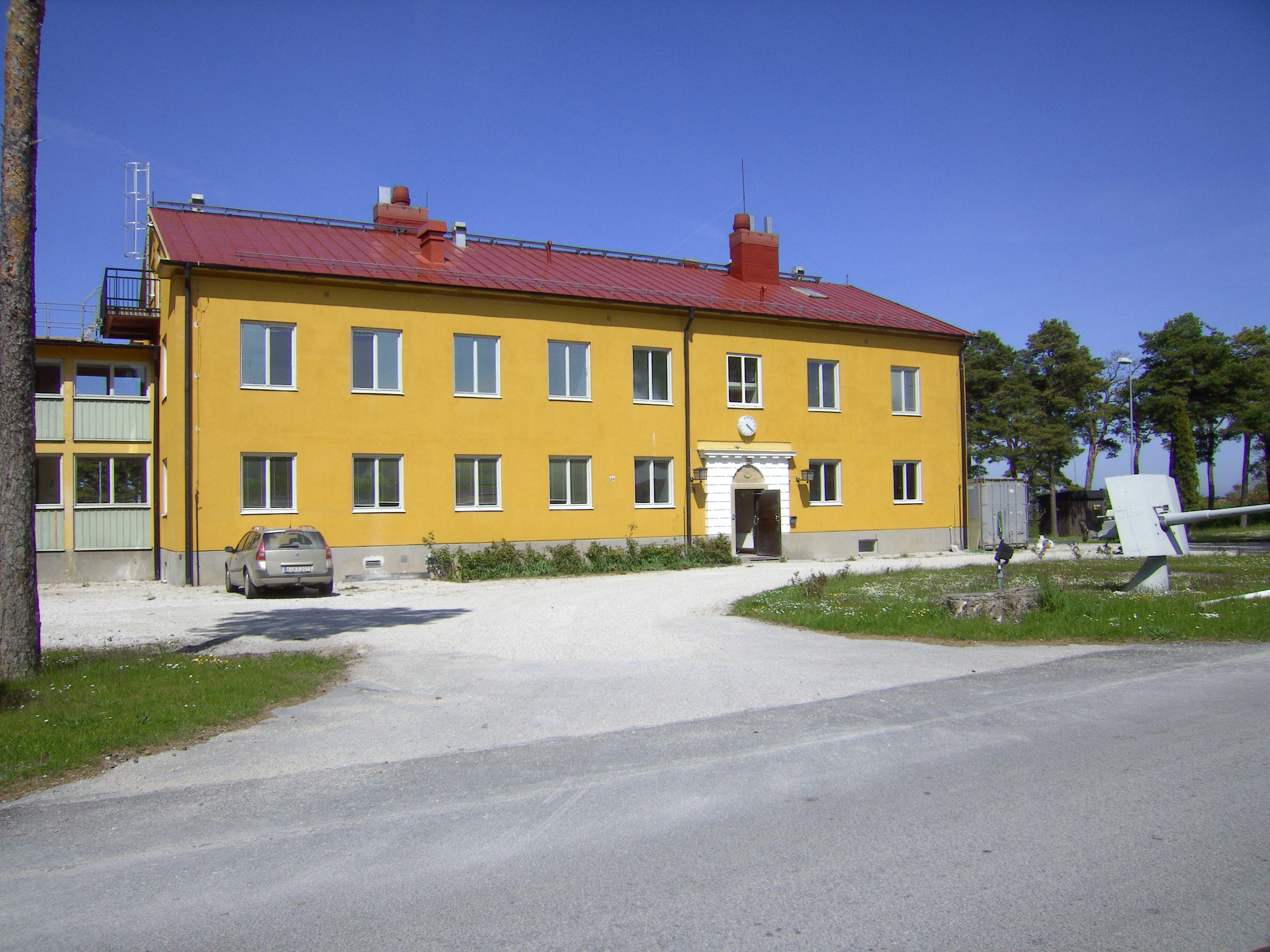
Chancellery

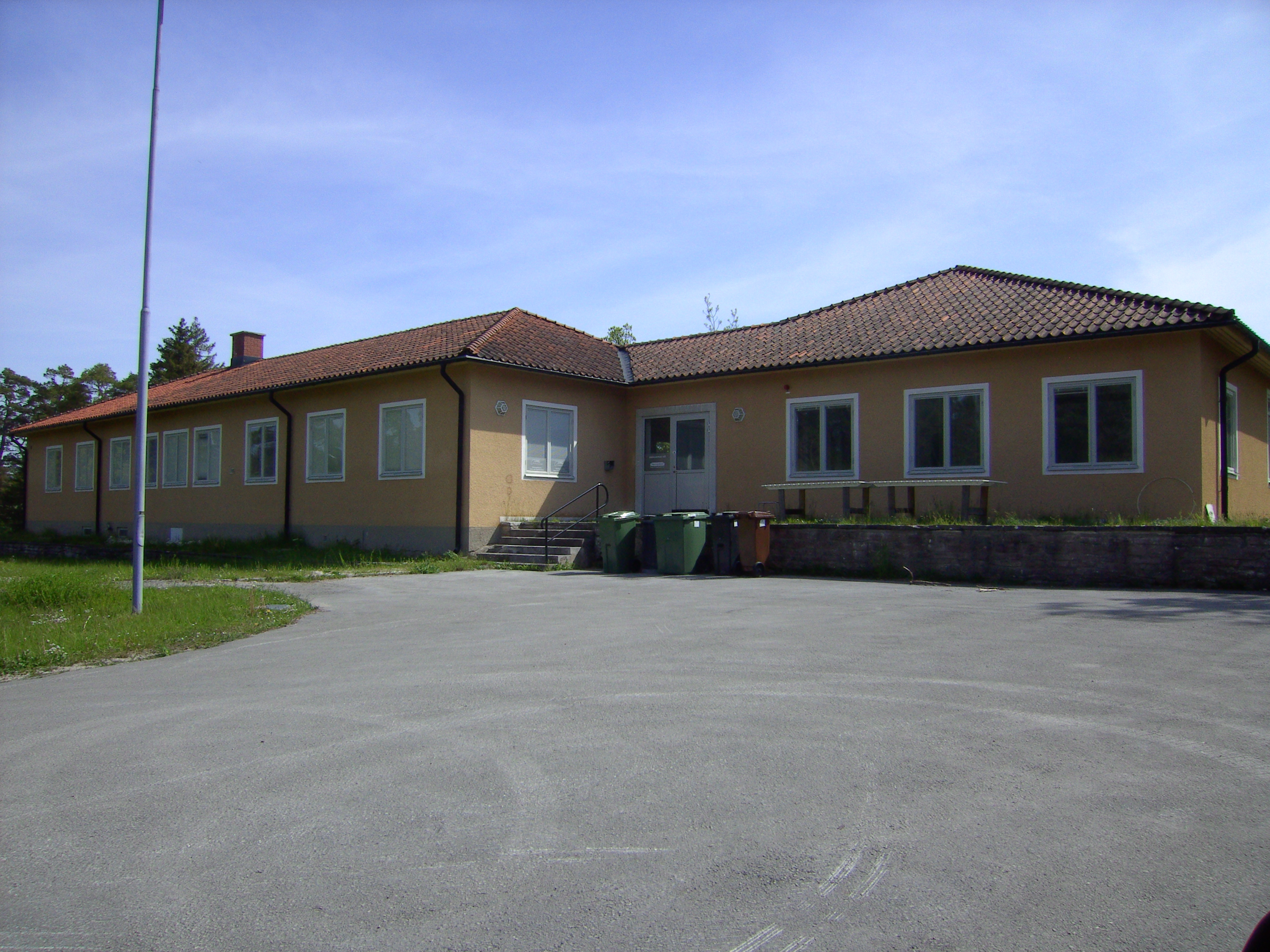
Hospital

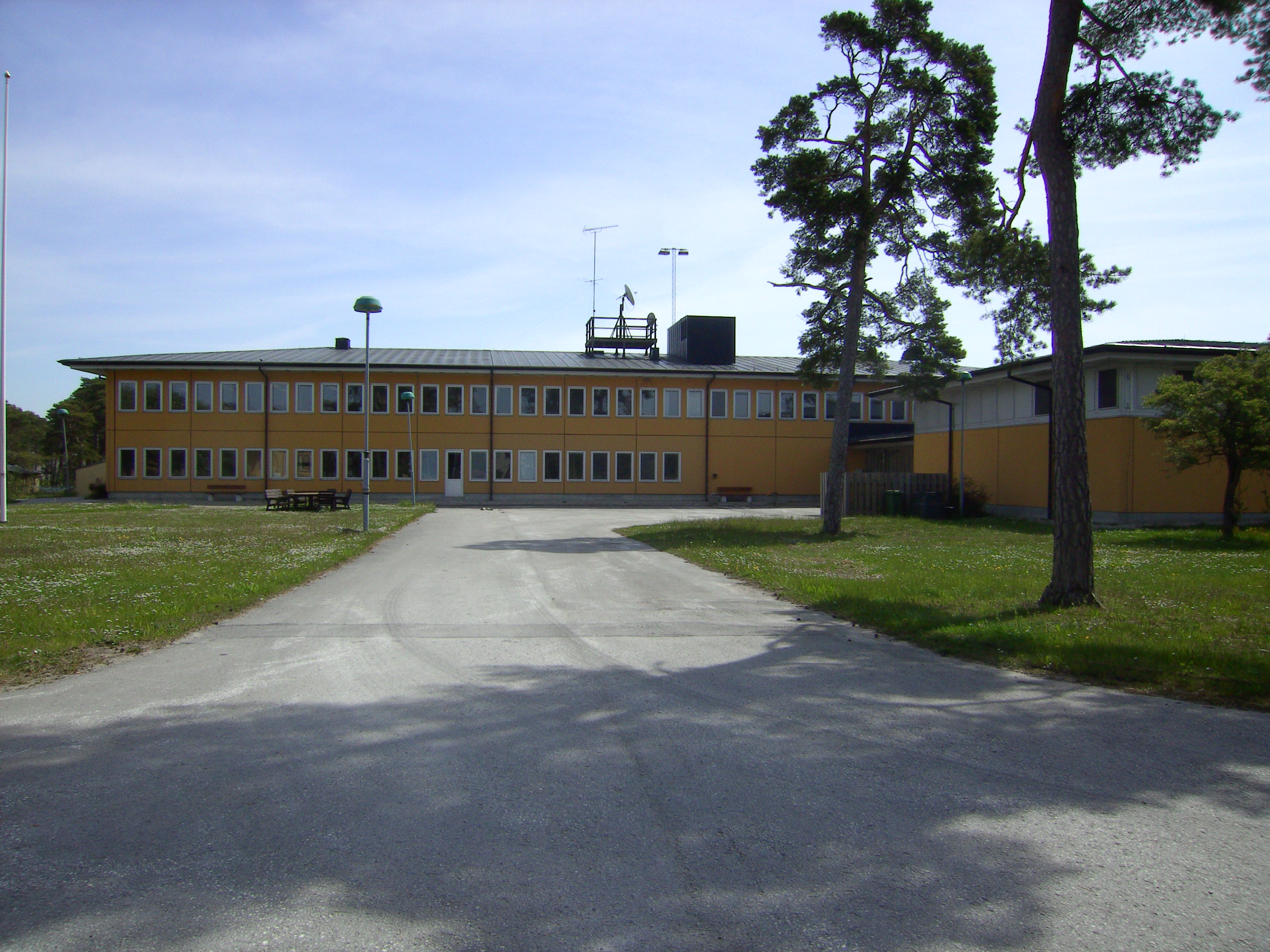
School building. Built in 1984.

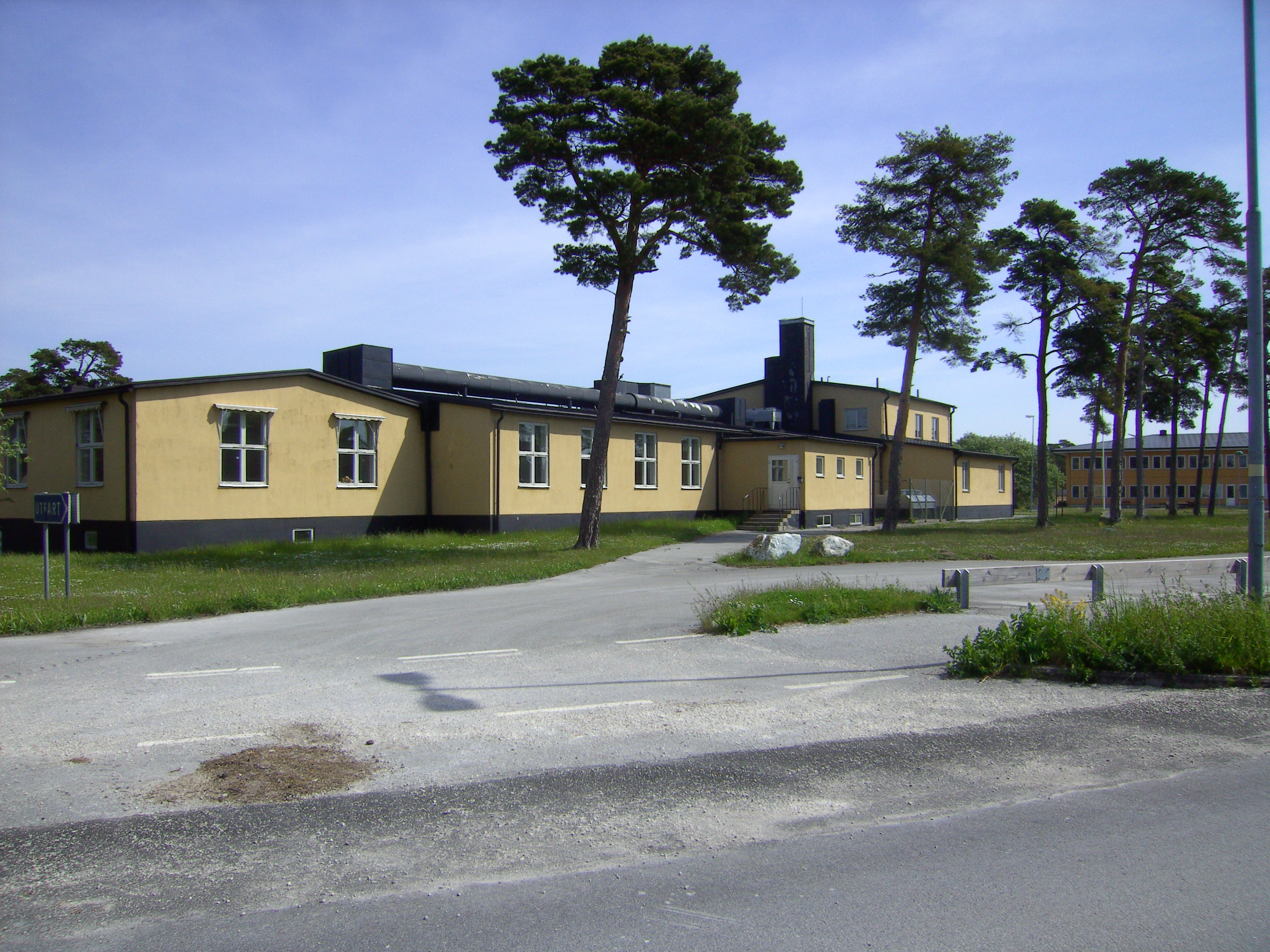
Restaurant

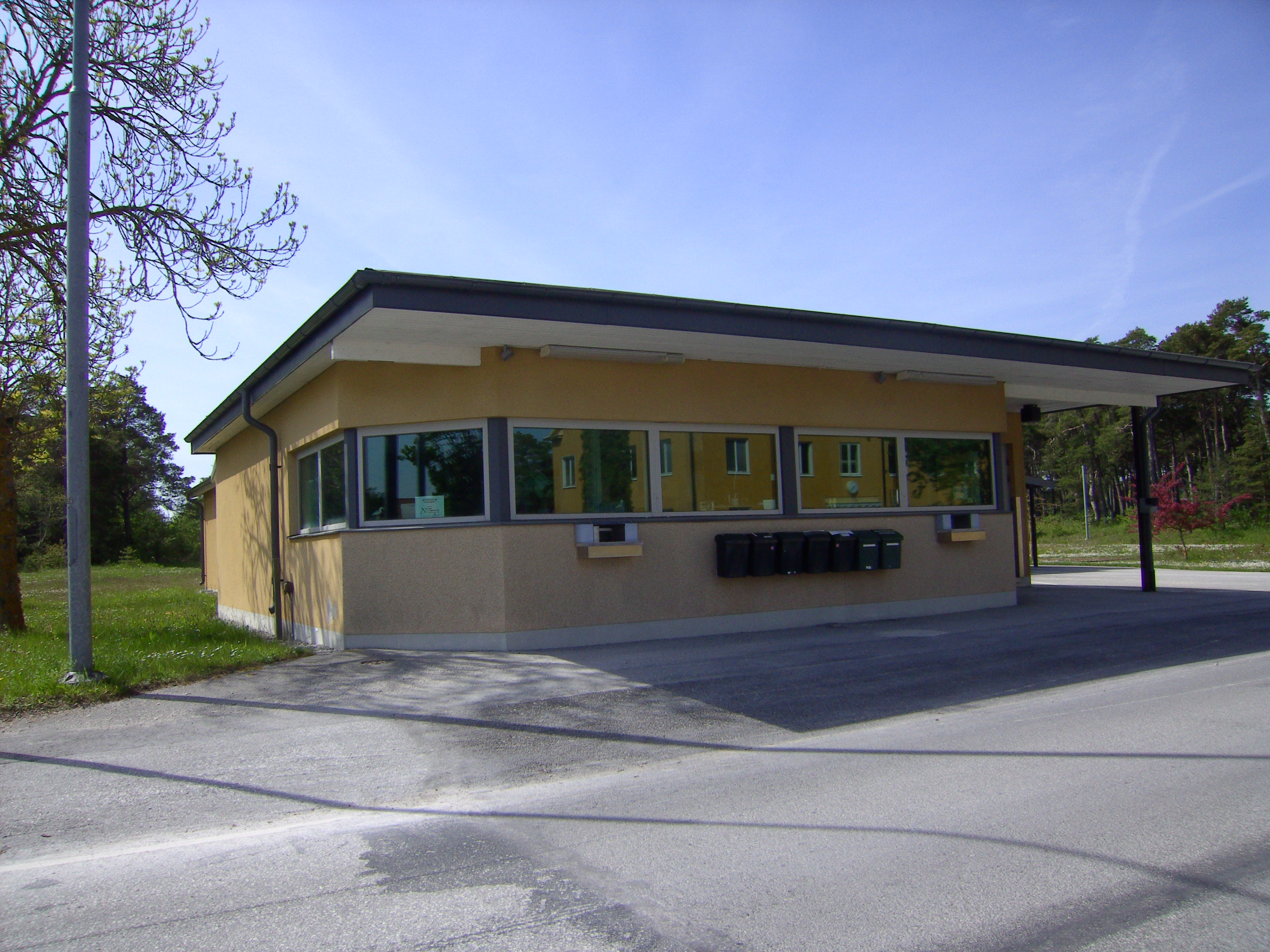
Guardhouse

== Artillery guns ==
The following guns were used at GK/KA 3 from 1880s until 2000:

- 12 cm gun m/1873; in use from 1880s until late 1890s
- 17 cm gun m/1869; in use from 1880s until late 1910s
- 57 mm gun m/1892; in use from late 1890s until late 1910s
- 15 cm gun m/1883; in use from mid to late 1910s
- 10.5 cm kanon m/34 (rörlig); in use from mid 1930s until mid-1940s
- 15 cm gun m/1898–1936; in use from late 1930s until 1980s
- 21 cm gun m/1898; in use from late 1930s until early 1970s
- 57 mm gun m/1889 B; in use from late 1930s until mid 1960s
- 12 cm kanon M/94; in use 1939 until 1978 (considerably modernized system)
- 15.2 cm gun m/37 (mobile); in use from mid 1940s
- 15.2 cm gun m/51 ("Siam"); in use from mid 1950s
- 7.5 cm gun m/05–12; in use from early 1950s until 1979
- 7.5 cm tornpjäs m/57; in use from late 1950s
- 7.5 cm gun m/65 (mobile); in use from 1971 until 1992
- Kustrobot 52 (Rb 52) (mobile); in use from early 1970s
- 12 cm automatic turret gun m/70 ("ERSTA"); in use from late 1970s until 2000
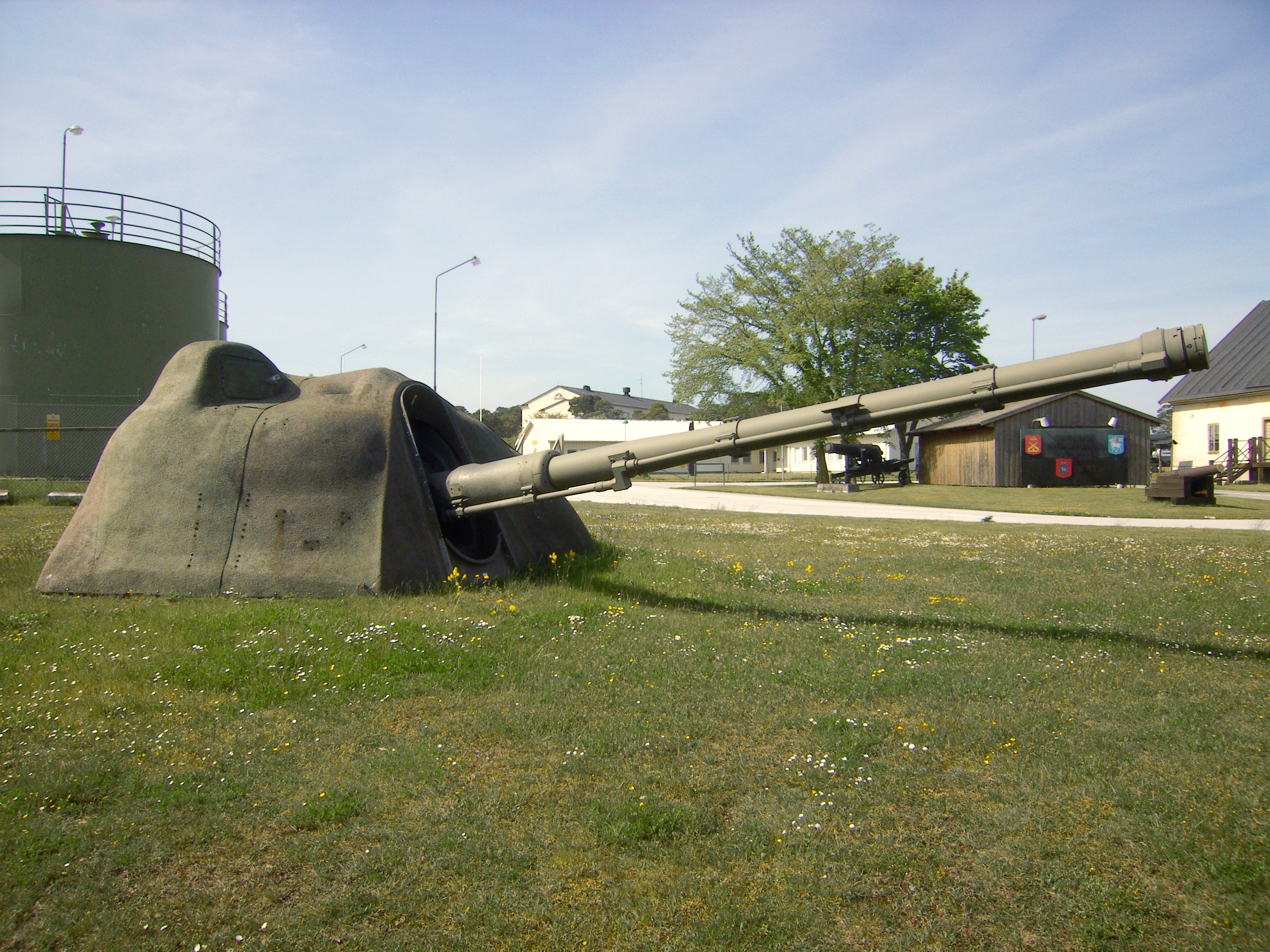
12 cm automatic turret gun m/70 ("ERSTA") at the KA 3 museum in Fårösund.

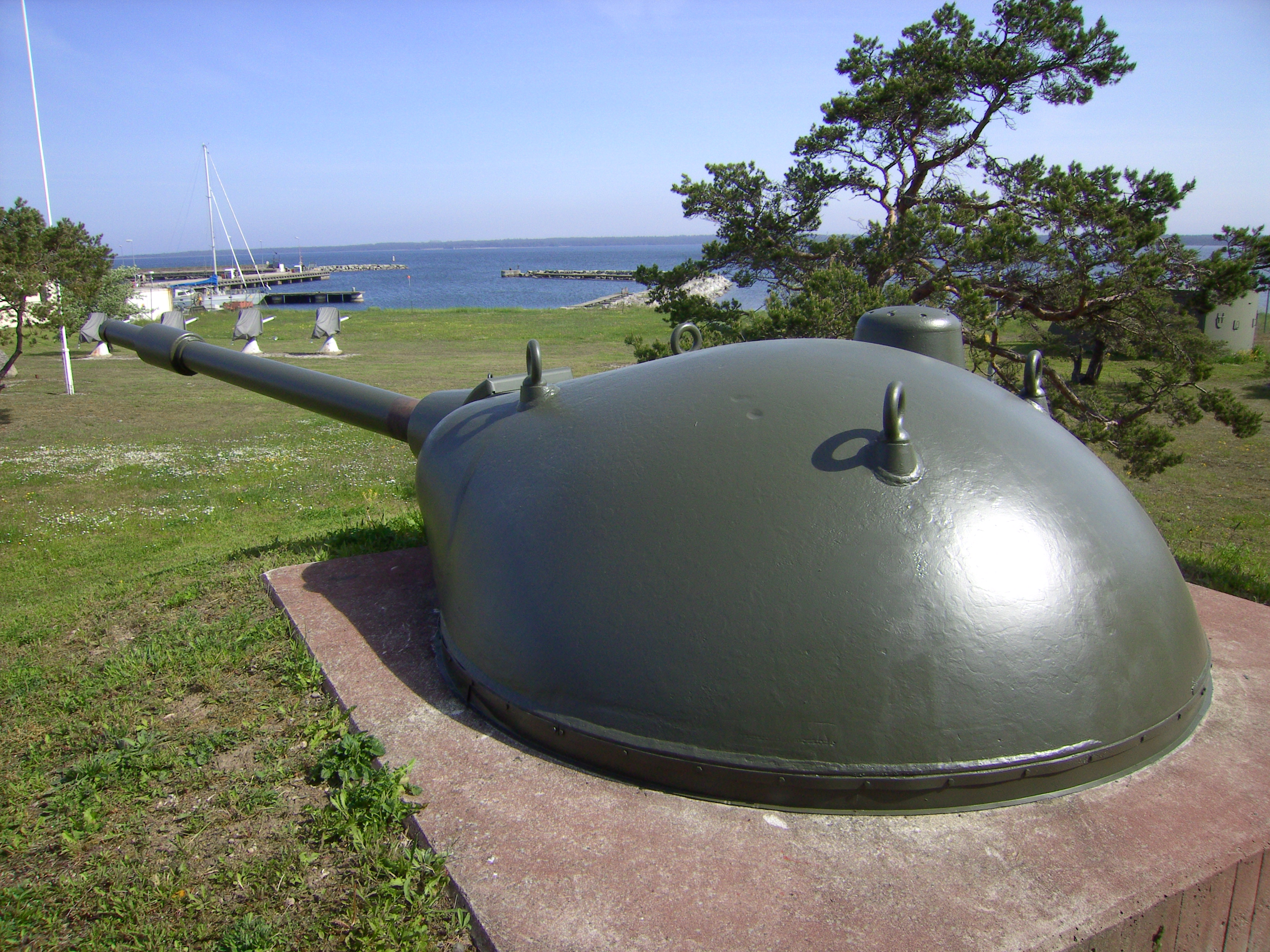
7.5 cm tornpjäs m/57 at the KA 3 museum in Fårösund.

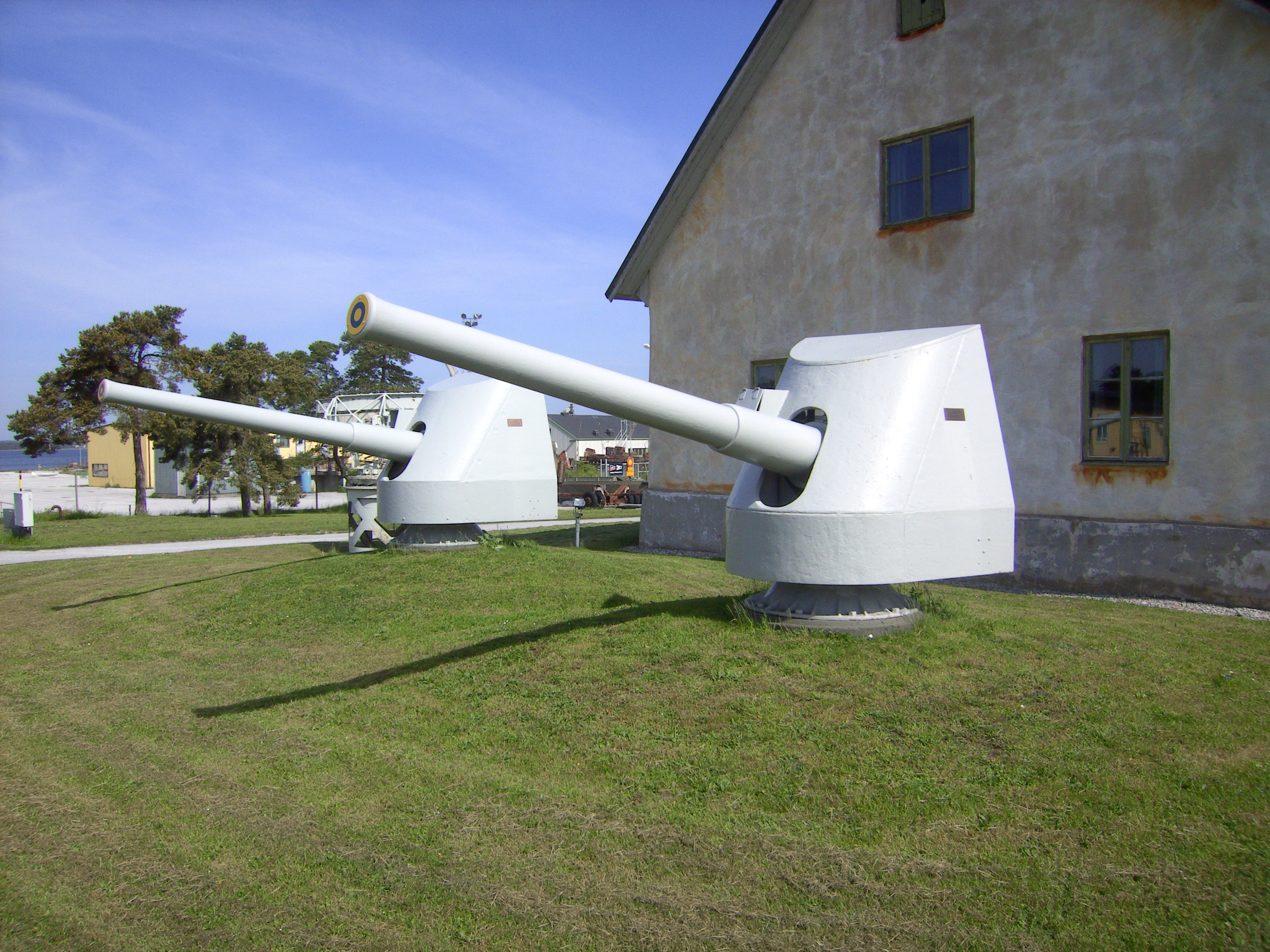
12 cm kanon M/94 at the KA 3 museum in Fårösund.

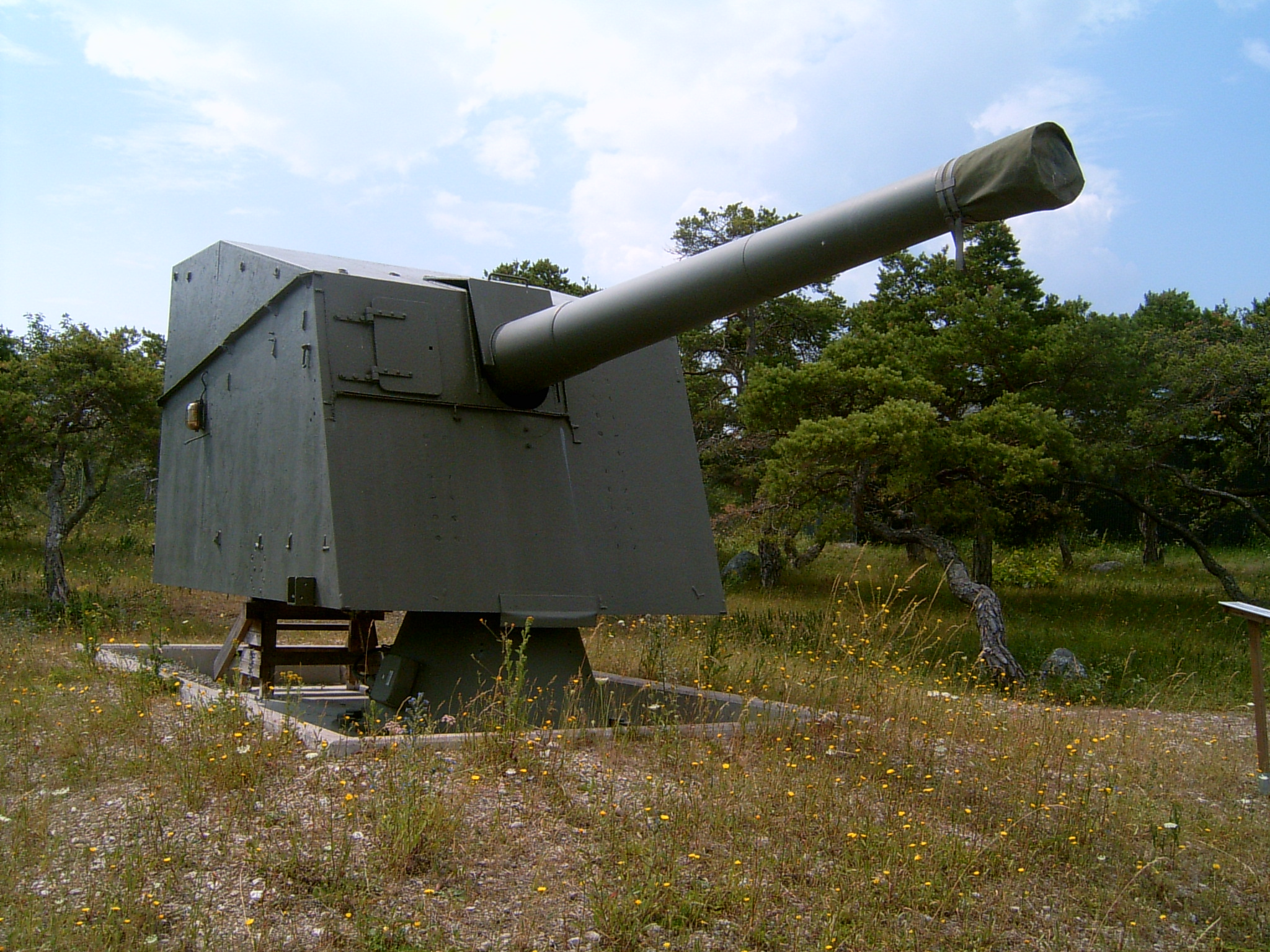
15.2 cm gun m/98 at the KA 3 museum in Fårösund.

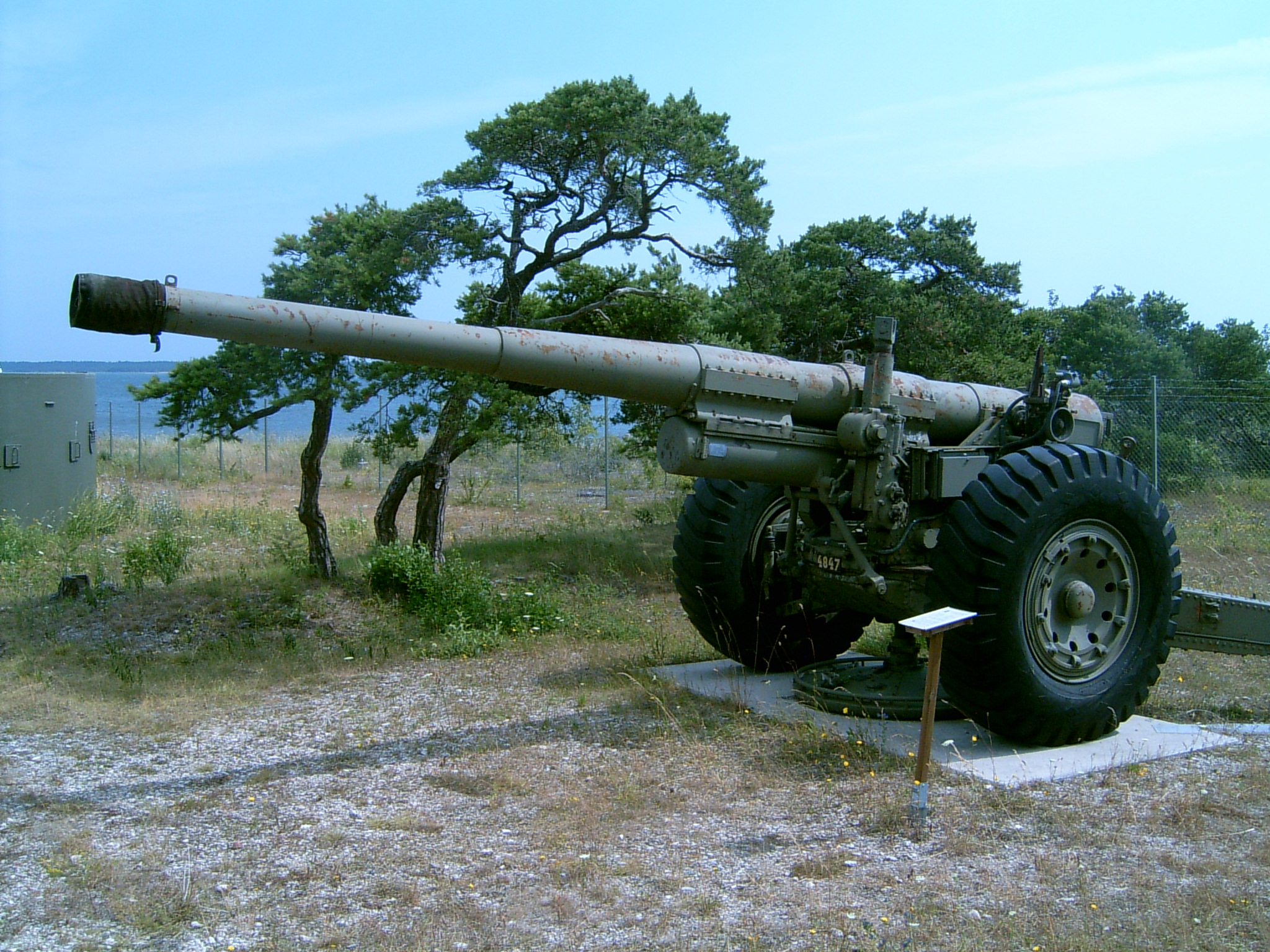
15.2 cm gun m/37 at the KA 3 museum in Fårösund.

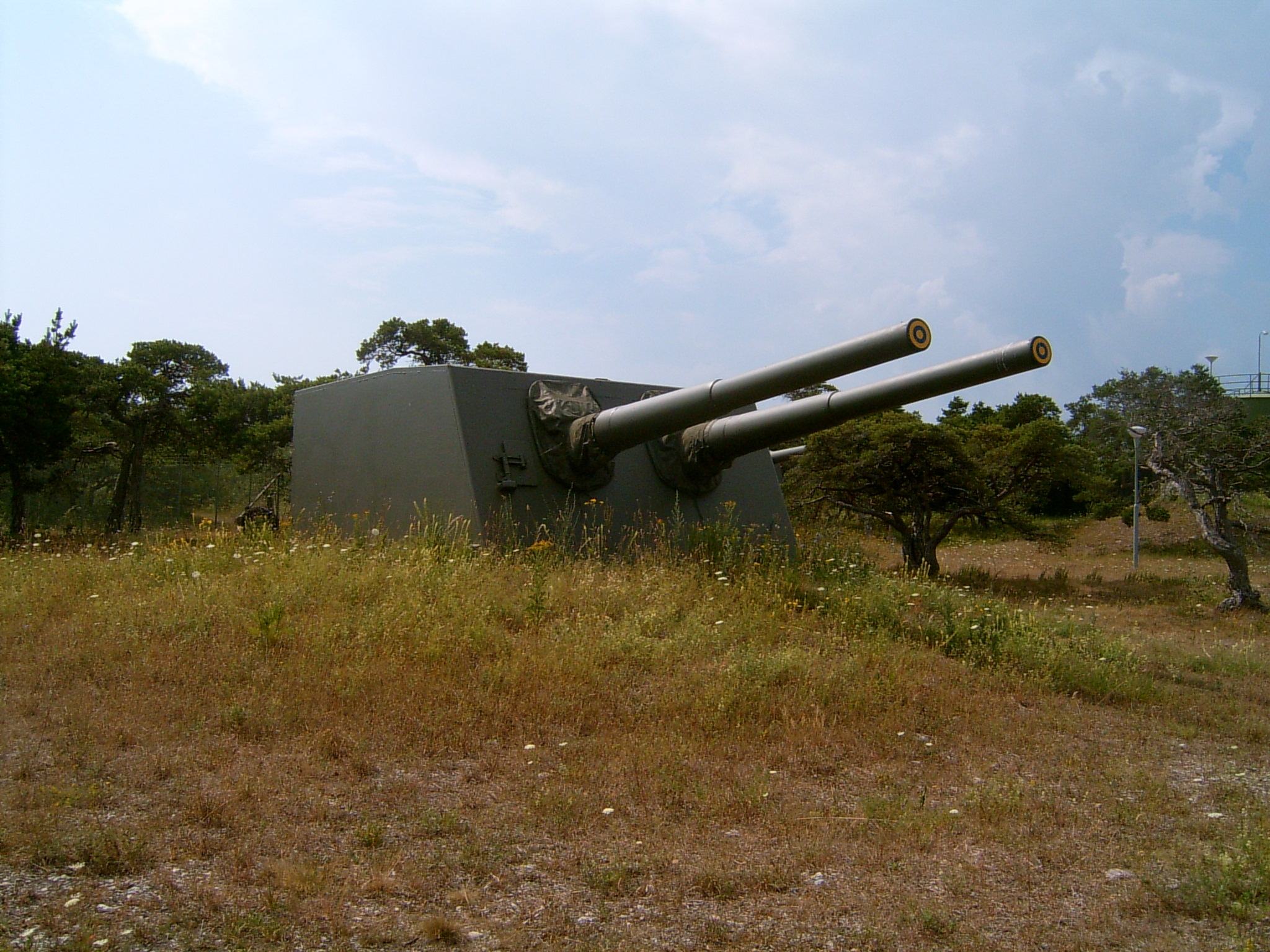
15.2 cm gun m/51 at the KA 3 museum in Fårösund.

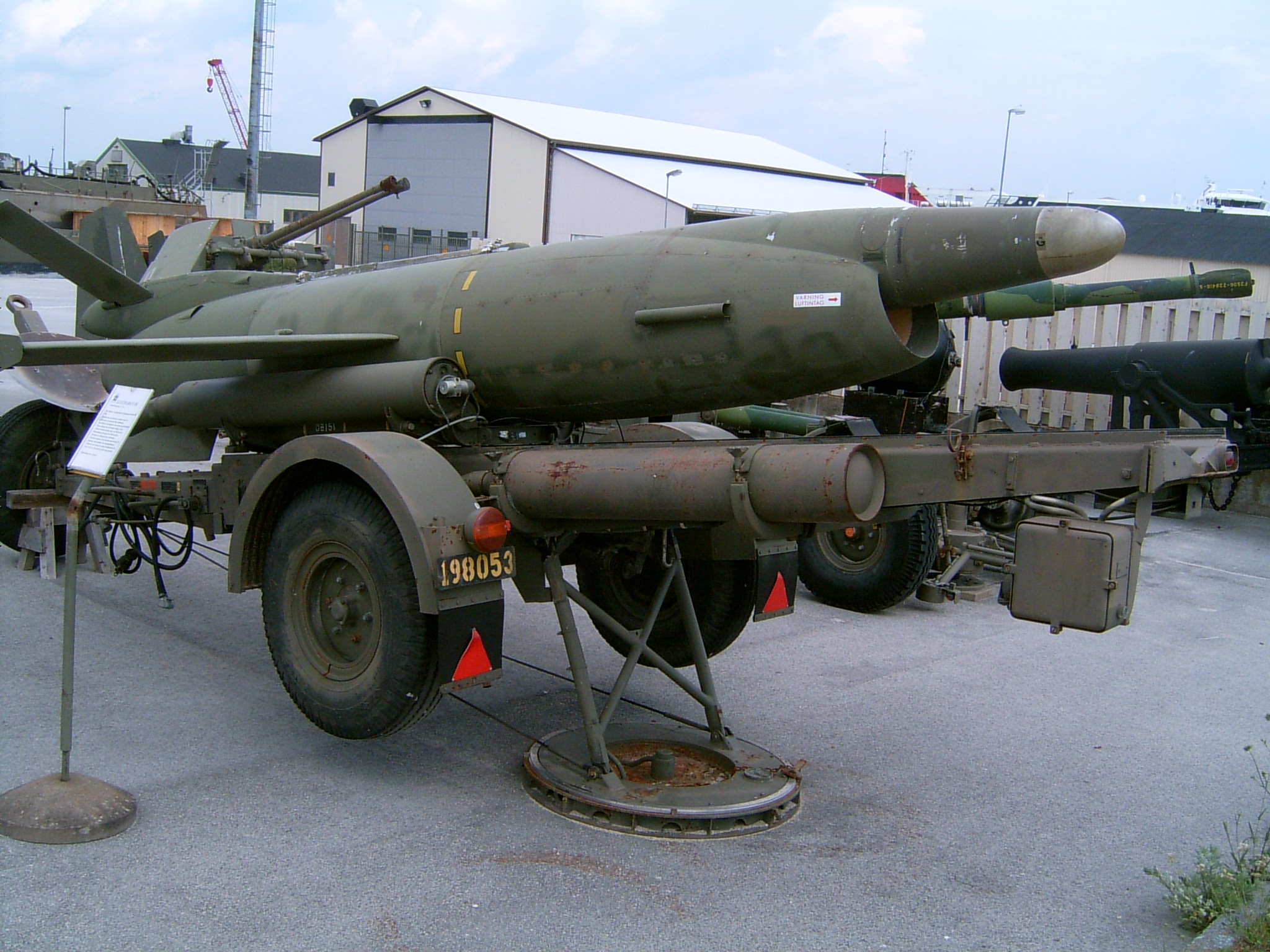
Robot 08 (Rb 08) at the KA 3 museum in Fårösund.

== Heraldry and traditions ==
=== Colours, standards and guidons ===
On 1 June 1945, the first colour was presented at Stockholm Palace by His Majesty the King Gustaf V. On the 60th anniversary of the regiment on 6 June 1998, Major General Bengt-Arne Johansson presented a new colour. Blazon: "On red cloth in the centre the badge of the former Coastal Artillery; two gun barrels of older pattern in saltire between a royal crown proper and a blazing grenade and waves, all in yellow. In the first corner the provincial badge of Gotland; a white ram passant, armed yellow, a yellow crosstaff and a red banner with edging and five flaps in yellow."

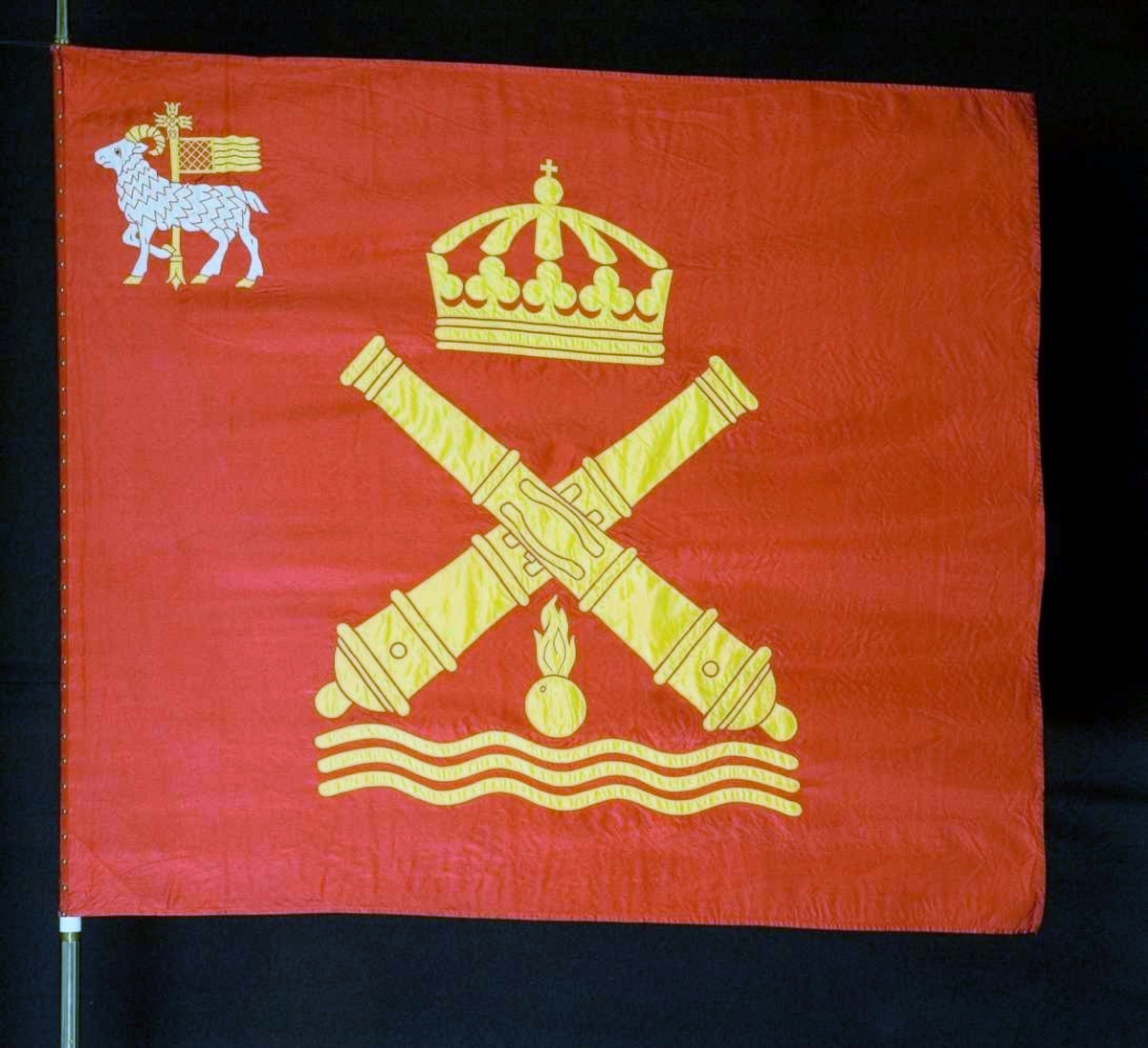
Colour

=== Coat of arms ===
The coat of arms of the Gotland Coastal Artillery Regiment (KA 3) from 1938 to 2000. Blazon: "Azure, the provincial badge of Gotland, a ram passant argent armed or, crosstaff and banner gules with edging and five flaps or. The shield surmounted two gunbarrels of older pattern in saltire above a flaming grenade and waves, all of the last colour".

=== Medals ===
In 2000, the Gotlands kustartilleriregementes (KA 3) minnesmedalj ("Gotland Coastal Artillery Regiment (KA 3) Commemorative Medal") in silver (GotlkaregSMM) of the 8th size was established. The medal ribbon is of red moiré with two yellow lines on each side and a yellow line on the middle.

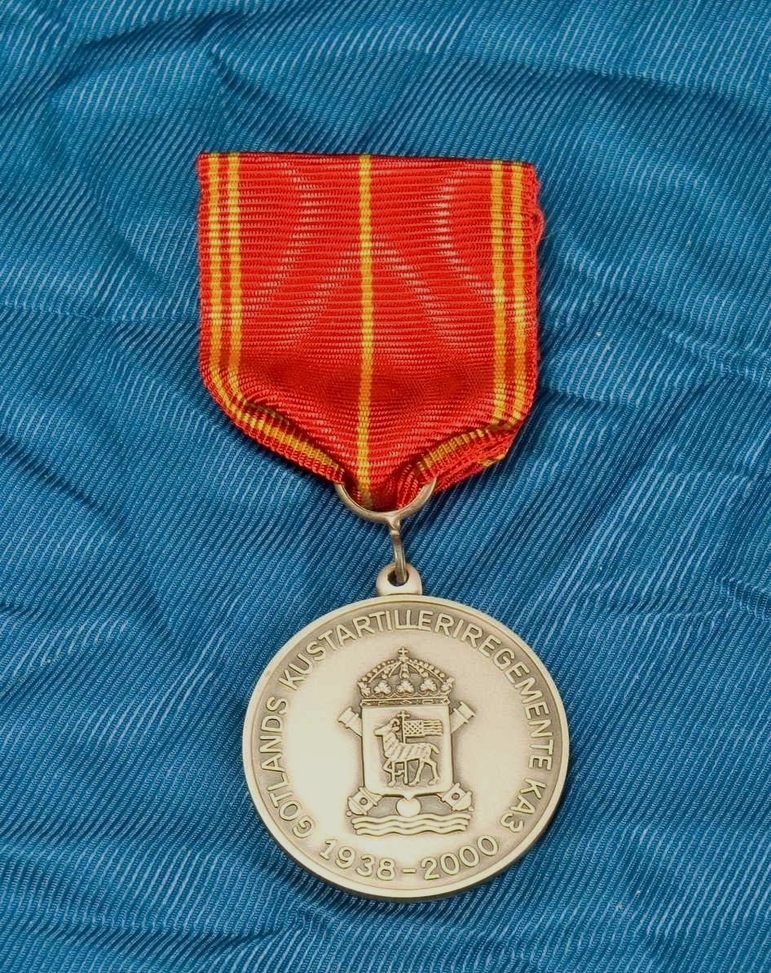
Commemorative Medal m/2000

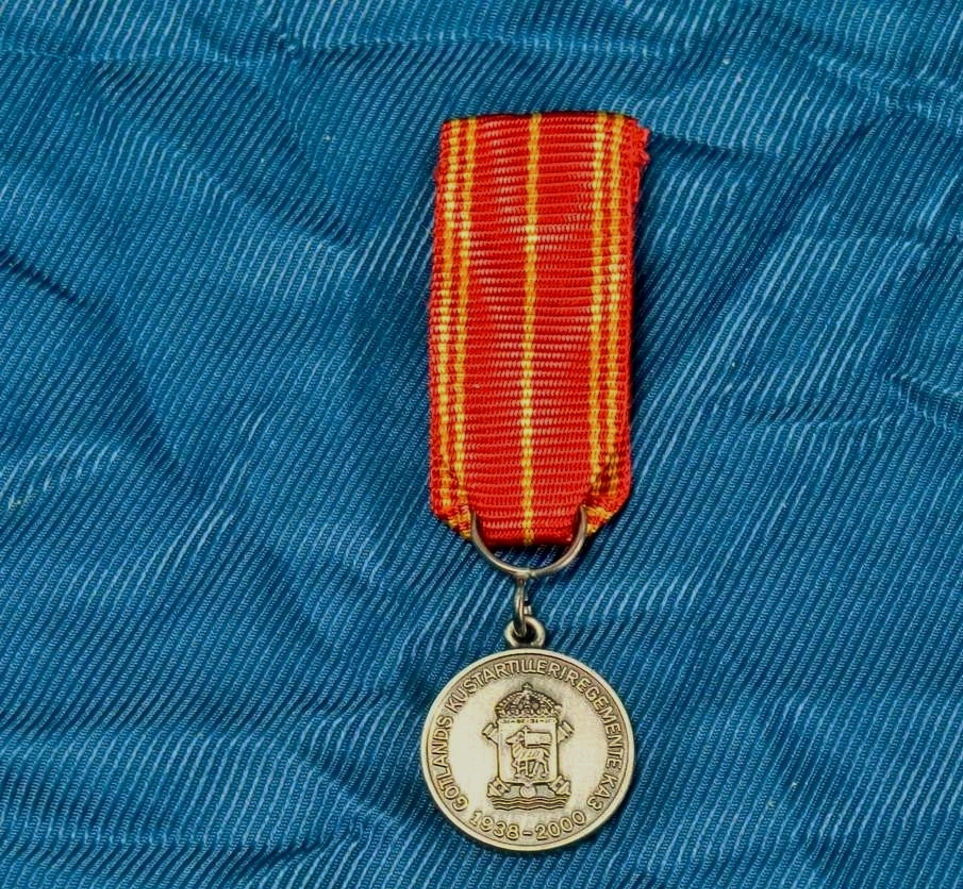
Miniature Commemorative Medal m/2000

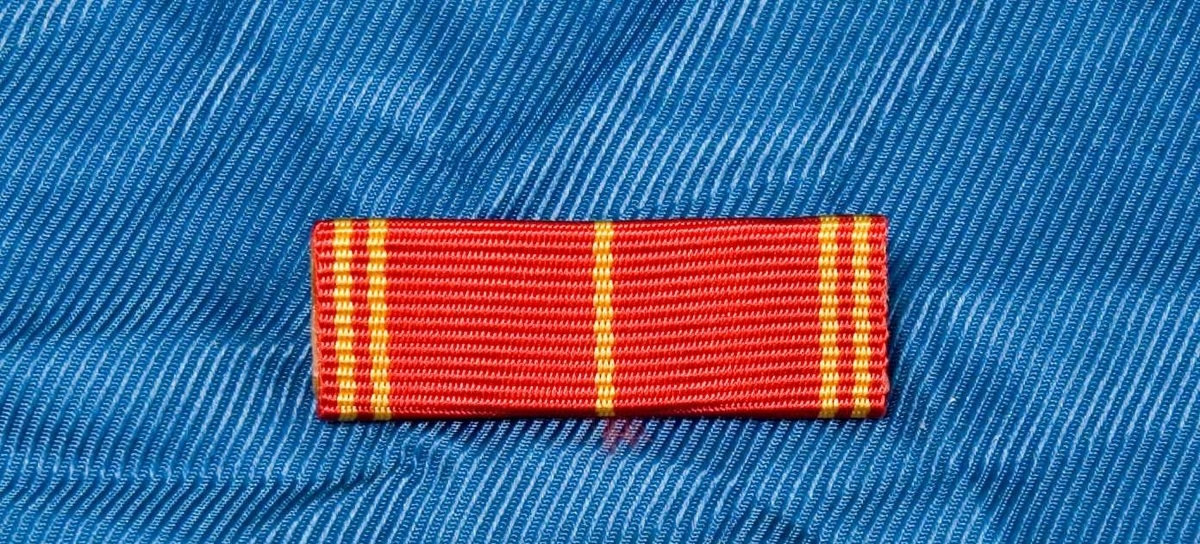
Medal ribbon

=== Other ===
In 1953, the Gotland Coastal Artillery Regiment adopted "Nordergutarna" by Åke Dohlin as regimental march, which was established on 13 June 1996.

== Commanding officers ==
Commanding officers of Fårösund Coastal Position/Fortress, KA 3, GK/KA 3, FMB and KA 3:

- 1904-05-14 – 1908-03-31: CPT Nils Vilhelm Bille
- 1908-04-01 – 1910-04-30: CPT Olof Wilhelm Brogren
- 1910-05-01 – 1912-04-30: CPT Theodor Hasselgren
- 1912-05-01 – 1914-04-30: CPT Nils Gustaf Henrik Wennerström
- 1914-05-01 – 1915-01-31: CPT John Gustaf Johansson-Carell
- 1915-02-01 – 1919-09-30: CPT Erik Ekström
- 1938-07-01 – 1941-06-30: LTC/COL Gösta Möller
- 1941-07-01 – 1947-09-30: COL Emil Cederlöf
- 1947-10-01 – 1951-09-30: COL Bo Lindeberg
- 1951-10-01 – 1954-03-31: COL Sven Haglund
- 1954-04-01 – 1957-09-30: COL Stig Stade
- 1957-10-01 – 1961-09-30: COL Carl-Fredrik Gillberg
- 1961-10-01 – 1962-09-30: COL Birger Ehnrot
- 1962-10-01 – 1964-09-30: COL Gunnar Eklund
- 1964-10-01 – 1966-09-30: COL Bo Varenius
- 1966-10-01 – 1971-09-30: COL Erik Lyth
- 1971-10-01 – 1974-09-30: COL Jean-Carlos Danckwardt
- 1974-10-01 – 1976-09-30: COL Arne Lundell
- 1980-10-01 – 1982-09-30: COL Torsten Engberg
- 1982-10-01 – 1985-09-30: COL Urban Sobéus
- 1985-10-01 – 1987-09-30: COL Håkan Söderlindh
- 1987-10-01 – 1993-05-31: COL Anders Hammarskjöld
- 1993-06-01 – 1996-12-31: COL Krister Arweström
- 1997-01-01 – 2000-06-30: COL Tommy Jonsson

== Names, designations and locations ==
Name	Translation	From		To
Fårösunds kustposition och Fårösunds kustartilleridetachement	Fårösund Coastal Position and Fårösund Coastal Artillery Detachment	1904-??-??	–	1914-??-??
Fårösunds fästning och Fårösunds kustartilleridetachement	Fårösund Fortress and Fårösund Coastal Artillery Detachment	1915-??-??	–	1919-??-??
Kungl. Gotlands kustartillerikår	Royal Gotland Coastal Artillery Corps	1937-07-01	–	1961-06-30
Kungl. Gotlands kustartilleriförsvar med Gotlands kustartillerikår	Royal Gotland Coastal Artillery Defence with Gotland Coastal Artillery Corps	1961-07-01	–	1974-12-31
Gotlands kustartilleriförsvar med Gotlands kustartillerikår	Gotland Coastal Artillery Defence with Gotland Coastal Artillery Corps	1975-01-01	–	1975-06-30
Gotlands kustartilleriförsvar med Gotlands kustartilleriregemente	Gotland Coastal Artillery Defence with Gotland Coastal Artillery Regiment	1975-07-01	–	1994-06-30
Fårösunds marinbrigad med Gotlands kustartilleriregemente	Fårösund Marine Brigade with Gotland Coastal Artillery Regiment	1994-07-01	–	1997-12-31
Gotlands kustartilleriregemente	Gotland Coastal Artillery Regiment	1998-01-01	–	2000-10-31
Avvecklingsorganisation	Decommissioning Organisation	2000-11-01	–	2001-06-30
Designation		From		To
KA 3		1937-07-01	–	1961-06-30
GK/KA 3		1961-07-01	–	1994-06-30
FMB		1994-07-01	–	1997-12-31
KA 3		1998-01-01	–	2000-10-31
Location		From		To
Fårösund Garrison		1937-07-01	–	2001-06-30

== See also ==
- List of Swedish coastal artillery regiments
