= Göran Gunnarsson =

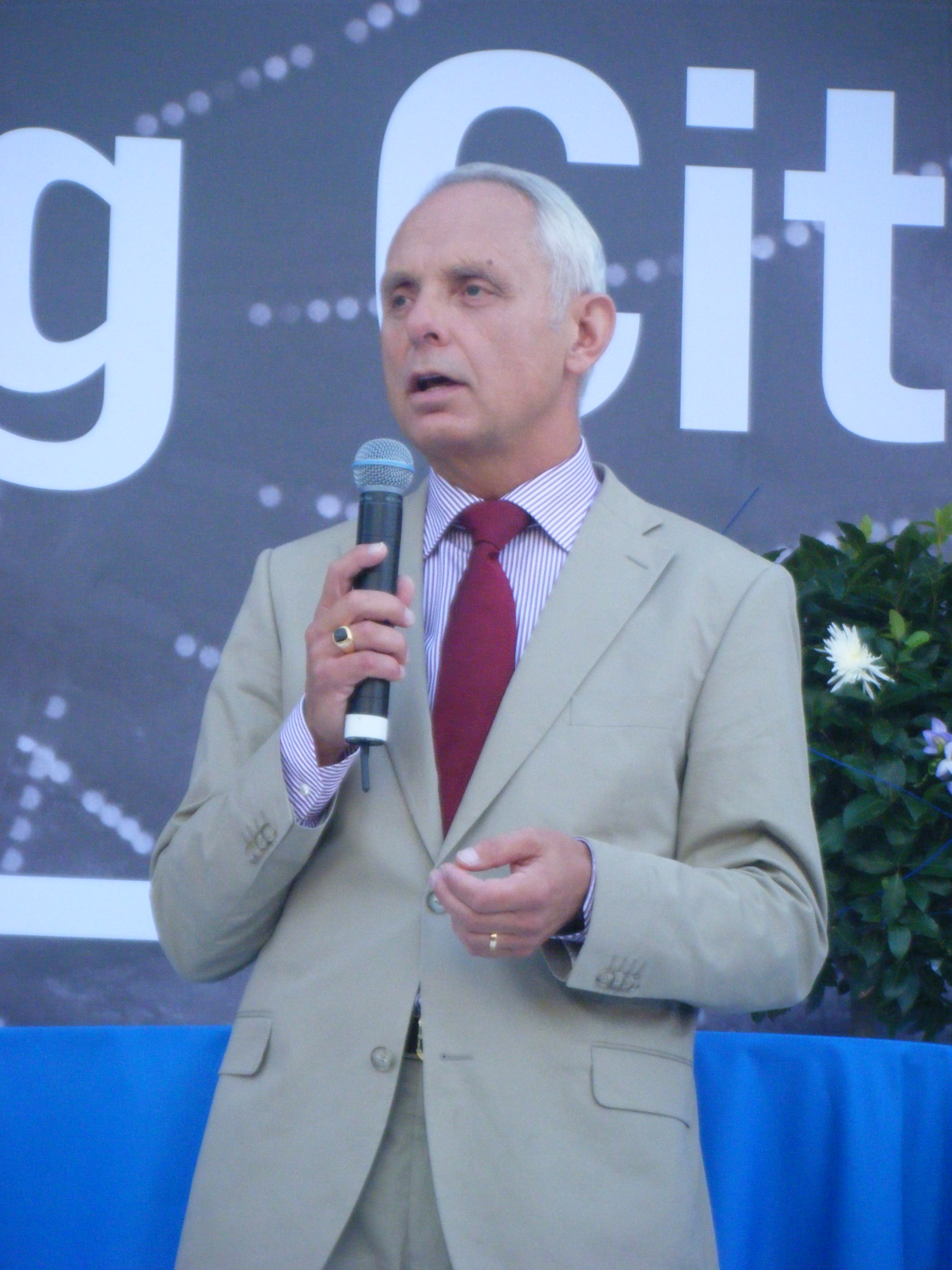
- Born: Claes Göran Gunnarsson; 8 March 1950 (age 76); Borås, Sweden
- Military career
- Allegiance: Sweden
- Branch: Amphibious Corps (Swedish Navy)
- Service years: 1970s–2005
- Rank: Lieutenant General
- Commands: Marinens krigshögskola; UNMOP; General Training and Management Directorate
- Other work: GD of Rescue Services Agency; CEO of Storstockholms Lokaltrafik

Lieutenant General Claes Göran Gunnarsson (born 8 March 1950) is a retired Swedish Coastal Artillery/Swedish Amphibious Corps officer. His senior commands include as head of the General Training and Management Directorate. Gunnarsson is known for leading the special working group assigned with investigation which units would be disbanded in accordance with the Defence Act of 2004. Gunnarsson served in the Swedish Armed Forces for over 30 years before retiring in 2005. He then served as Director General of the Rescue Services Agency, as CEO of Storstockholms Lokaltrafik and as managing director of the Greater Stockholm Fire Brigade.

== Early life ==
Gunnarsson was born in Borås, Sweden.

== Career ==
=== Military career ===
Gunnarsson became a lieutenant in 1974 and he attended the Marine Corps Command and Staff College at the Marine Corps Base Quantico from 1991 to 1992. After his time at Quantico, Gunnarsson was posted to the Swedish Armed Forces Headquarters, Plans and Policy Directorate, as a section head. In 1994, he took command of one of the marine defense battalions in the Vaxholm Coastal Artillery Regiment (KA 1). Gunnarsson was commanding officer of the Marinens krigshögskola (MKHS) from 1995 to 1996 and was promoted to colonel in 1996. He was then sent to Croatia as Chief Military Observer of the United Nations Mission of Observers in Prevlaka (UNMOP) based out of Cavtat. Gunnarsson served as the first mission commander from January to November 1996. In 1997, he was promoted senior colonel, and posted as Chief of the Naval Staff. In 1999, he was promoted to major general and assumed the position of Assistant Head of Plans and Policy Directorate, Swedish Armed Forces Headquarters. This posting made him the Supreme Commander's main planner for long term planning and responsible for the Swedish Armed Forces' annual reports to the Ministry of Defence and the Riksdag. In 2002, Gunnarsson was promoted to lieutenant general and appointed head of the General Training and Management Directorate (Grundorganisationsledningen).

On August 28, 2003, it was decided that a special working group would prepare a basis for the following year's Defence Act on what the Swedish Armed Forces's general organization would look like in the future. The group included, among others, Gunnarsson together with the director Dan Ohlsson, senior adviser Johan Appelberg and the desk officer Mårten Sundmark from the Ministry of Defence and colonel Carol Paraniak and colonel Bo Bengtsson from the Swedish Armed Forces. This group traveled around Sweden in 2004 to be able to make a decision about which units should be disbanded. As soon as they arrived at a place it said the "Death Squad is in town" in the local newspapers. Gunnarsson led the group, whose real name was the Arbetsgruppen Grundorganisation, AG Gro. Gunnarsson was scheduled to take up the position of Chief of Training & Development (Produktionschef) at the newly organized headquarters from 1 July 2005. Instead, Gunnarsson chose to retire on the same date.

=== Business career ===
Gunnarsson then worked with company development. In January 2006, the Swedish government appointed Gunnarsson as Director General of the Rescue Services Agency in Karlstad. He took office on 1 March 2006. He was also chairman of the Rescue Services Agency's Board of Directors and the Centrum för risk- och säkerhetsutbildning ("Center for Risk and Safety Training"). Furthermore, he was a member of the Rådet för räddningstjänst ("Rescue Services Council") and Folke Bernadotte Academy's program and activities council.

On 23 February 2010, Storstockholms Lokaltrafik's Board of Directors appointed Gunnarsson as permanent CEO after serving as acting CEO in the fall of 2009. He left that post on 23 June 2011. Gunnarsson took up the position of managing director of Greater Stockholm Fire Brigade (Storstockholms brandförsvar) on 1 December 2012. Gunnarsson has also been chairman of the National Swedish Road Safety Organization (Nationalföreningen för trafiksäkerhetens främjande, NTF) and a board member of SOS Alarm Sverige AB.

== Personal life ==
Gunnarsson is married to Christel with whom he has two daughters.

== Dates of rank ==
- 1974 – Lieutenant
- 1996 – Colonel
- 1997 – Senior colonel
- 1999 – Major general
- 2002 – Lieutenant general

== Honours ==
- Member of the Royal Swedish Academy of War Sciences (1998)
- Member of the Royal Swedish Society of Naval Sciences (1993)

Military offices
Preceded by None	United Nations Mission of Observers in Prevlaka (UNMOP); January 1996 – November 1996	Succeeded by Harold Mwakio Tanga
Preceded by Bengt-Arne Johansson	General Training and Management Directorate; 2002–2005	Succeeded by None
Government offices
Preceded by Christina Salomonson	Director General of the Rescue Services Agency; 2006–2008	Succeeded by Helena Lindberg
Business positions
Preceded by Ingemar Ziegler	CEO of Storstockholms Lokaltrafik; 2009–2011	Succeeded by Anders Lindström
