= Gösta Möller =

Swedish officer and sprinter

- Born: Sven Gösta Möller; 15 June 1887; Karlskrona, Sweden
- Died: 23 September 1983 (aged 96); Karlskrona, Sweden
- Military career
- Allegiance: Sweden
- Branch: Coastal Artillery (Swedish Navy)
- Service years: 1910–1947
- Rank: Major General
- Commands: Gotland Coastal Artillery Regiment; Karlskrona Coastal Artillery Regiment; Blekinge Coastal Artillery Defence; Karlskrona Defence District

Major General Sven Gösta Möller (15 June 1887 – 23 September 1983) was a senior officer in the Swedish Coastal Artillery and a track and field athlete who competed in the 1912 Summer Olympics.

== Early life ==
Möller was born on 15 June 1887 in Karlskrona, Sweden, the son of Carl Möller, a banker, and his wife Inga Bengtsson. In 1912 he was eliminated in the first round of the 200 metres competition as well as of the 400 metres event.

== Career ==
Möller was commissioned as an officer in 1910 and was assigned as an underlöjtnant in the Swedish Coastal Artillery, where he was promoted to lieutenant in 1915. He served in the Positionsartilleriregementet from 1917 to 1918. Möller attended the Royal Swedish Naval Staff College from 1917 to 1918, 1920 to 1921, and 1924 to 1926. He served in the Naval Staff from 1921 to 1922 and was a cadet officer in the Royal Swedish Naval Academy from 1921 to 1923. Möller served as an adjutant to the Chief of the Swedish Coastal Artillery from 1923 to 1931, was promoted to captain in 1923, and served as a teacher at the Royal Swedish Naval Academy and the Royal Swedish Naval Staff College from 1924 to 1931.

Möller passed the general course and the staff course at the Royal Swedish Naval Staff College and conducted military studies abroad in 1930. He was promoted to major in 1935 and served as chief of staff in the Vaxholm Fortress from 1935 to 1936. Möller then served in the staff of the Chief of the Swedish Coastal Artillery from 1937 to 1938 and as commander of the Gotland Coastal Artillery Defence with Gotland Coastal Artillery Corps from 1938 to 1941. He was promoted to lieutenant colonel in 1939 and to colonel in 1940. Möller served as commander of the Karlskrona Coastal Artillery Regiment from 1941 to 1943, as commander of the Blekinge Coastal Artillery Defence as well as commander of Karlskrona Defence District from 1943 to 1947 when he retired and was appointed major general in the reserve.

== Personal life ==
In 1919, Möller married Marit Hall (1897–1952), the daughter of banker August Hall and Gunhild Fältström. They had two children: Gunnar (born 1921) and Dagmar (born 1926).

== Dates of rank ==
- 1910 – Underlöjtnant
- 1915 – Lieutenant
- 1923 – Captain
- 1935 – Major
- 1939 – Lieutenant colonel
- 1940 – Colonel
- 1947 – Major general

== Awards and decorations ==
- (Sweden) Commander 1st Class of the Order of the Sword (15 November 1946)
- (Sweden) Commander of the Order of the Sword (15 November 1943)
- (Sweden) Knight of the Order of Vasa (1933)
- (Denmark) King Christian X's Liberty Medal

== Honours ==
- Member of the Royal Swedish Society of Naval Sciences (1939)
- Honorary member of the Royal Swedish Society of Naval Sciences (1947)

Military offices
Preceded by None	Gotland Coastal Artillery Regiment; 1938–1941	Succeeded by Emil Cederlöf
Preceded by Hjalmar Åström	Karlskrona Coastal Artillery Regiment; 1941–1943	Succeeded by Alf Nyman
Preceded by Gösta Ehrensvärd	Blekinge Coastal Artillery Defence; Karlskrona Defence District; 1943–1947	Succeeded by Alf Nyman
