= Bengt-Arne Johansson (officer) =

Swedish lieutenant-general (1943–2025)

- Born: Bengt Arne Johansson; 1 October 1943 (age 83); Gothenburg, Sweden
- Military career
- Allegiance: Sweden
- Branch: Coastal Artillery/Amphibious Corps
- Service years: 1969–2003
- Rank: Lieutenant General
- Nickname: B-A
- Commands: Karlskrona Coastal Artillery Regiment; Central Dept., Naval Command; Deputy Chief of the Joint Operations Command; General Training and Management Directorate

Lieutenant General Bengt Arne (Bengt-Arne) Johansson (born 1 October 1943) is a retired Swedish Coastal Artillery/Swedish Amphibious Corps officer. His senior commands include Operation Commander/Deputy Chief of the Joint Operations Command (1997–1998), Deputy Chief of the General Training and Management Directorate (1998–2000) and as Chief of the General Training and Management Directorate (2000–2003).

== Early life ==
Johansson was born on 1 October 1943 in Örgryte Parish, Gothenburg and Bohus County, Sweden. He passed studentexamen at the Swedish Armed Forces School for Secondary Education in 1968.

== Career ==
Johansson graduated from Royal Swedish Naval Academy in 1969 and was commissioned as an officer the same year in Gotland Coastal Artillery Corps with the rank of second lieutenant., where he from 1969 to 1978 served as instructor, platoon leader and company commander. Johansson was promoted to lieutenant in 1971 and to captain in 1972. He attended the Staff Course at the Swedish Armed Forces Staff College from 1978 to 1980. In 1980, he was promoted to major in Vaxholm Coastal Artillery Regiment, whereupon he from 1980 to 1981 served in the staff of the Eastern Military District. Johansson then attended the Marine Corps Command and Staff College in the United States from 1981 to 1982. Back in Sweden, he served as a teacher of strategy at the Swedish Armed Forces Staff College from 1982 to 1984 and was promoted to lieutenant colonel in 1983. He then served as first teacher of tactics at the Swedish Coast Artillery School (Kustartilleriets skjutskola, KAS) from 1984 to 1986 and served in the Intelligence Department in the Naval Staff from 1986 to 1987. In 1987, he was appointed lieutenant colonel with special position (Överstelöjtnant med särskild tjänsteställning), whereupon he served from 1987 to 1989 as department head at the Inspector of the Coastal Artillery Inspector and from 1989 to 1991 as head of Operations Section 1 in the Defence Staff.

In 1991, Johansson was promoted to colonel and assumed the commander of Karlskrona Coastal Artillery Regiment in Karlskrona on 1 October 1991, serving until 30 June 1994. In 1994, he was promoted to senior colonel and from 1994 to 1997 he served as head of the Central Department in the Naval Command as well as deputy head of the Naval Command at the Swedish Armed Forces Headquarters in Stockholm. Johansson attended a course at the Swedish National Defence College (FHS) in 1992 and the management course at FHS in 1995 and the Senior Course at the NATO Defense College in Rome, Italy in 1997. On 1 July 1997, Johansson was promoted to major general and assumed the position of Operation Commander (operationsledare)/Deputy Chief of the Joint Operations Command (Operationsledningen, OpL) in the Swedish Armed Forces Headquarters. He then served as Deputy Chief of the General Training and Management Directorate (Grundorganisationsledningen, GRO) from 1998 to 2000. Between 23 March 2000 and 7 November 2000, Johansson served as an expert in the Ministry of Defence's investigation (Frivilligorganisationsutredningen) into the future direction of voluntary defence activities and tasks within the Swedish Total Defence. Johansson then served as Chief of the General Training and Management Directorate from 2000 to 2003 when he retired from active service.

== Later life ==
Johansson served as the first chairman of the Förbundet Kustjägarna ("Coastal Ranger Association") from 2003. In addition, he acted as an advisor during the work of forming and launching the Coastal Ranger Association as a voluntary defence organization.

From 2005 to 2009, Johansson was chairman of Club Nórdico, a club for Scandinavian expatries in Fuengirola, Spain.

== Dates of rank ==
- 1969 – Second lieutenant
- 1971 – Lieutenant
- 1972 – Captain
- 1980 – Major
- 1983 – Lieutenant colonel
- 1987 – Överstelöjtnant med särskild tjänsteställning
- 1991 – Colonel
- 1994 – Senior colonel
- 1 July 1997 – Major general
- 2000 – Lieutenant general

== Awards and decorations ==
- (Sweden) Coastal Ranger Association Medal of Merit (Förbundet Kustjägarnas förtjänstmedalj) in silver (2006)

== Honours ==
- Member of the Royal Swedish Society of Naval Sciences (1988)
- Member of the Royal Swedish Academy of War Sciences (1988)

Military offices
Preceded by Roland Hultgren	Karlskrona Coastal Artillery Regiment; 1991–1994	Succeeded by Göran Boijsen
Preceded by Tomas Warming	Operation Commander/Deputy Chief of the Joint Operations Command; 1997–1998	Succeeded by Björn Hedskog
Preceded by None	Deputy Chief of the General Training and Management Directorate; 1998–2000	Succeeded by Lars Frisk
Preceded by Hans Berndtson	Chief of the General Training and Management Directorate; 2000–2003	Succeeded by Göran Gunnarsson
