= Otto Ludvig Beckman =

Swedish Navy officer and commanding officer of the Swedish Coastal Artillery

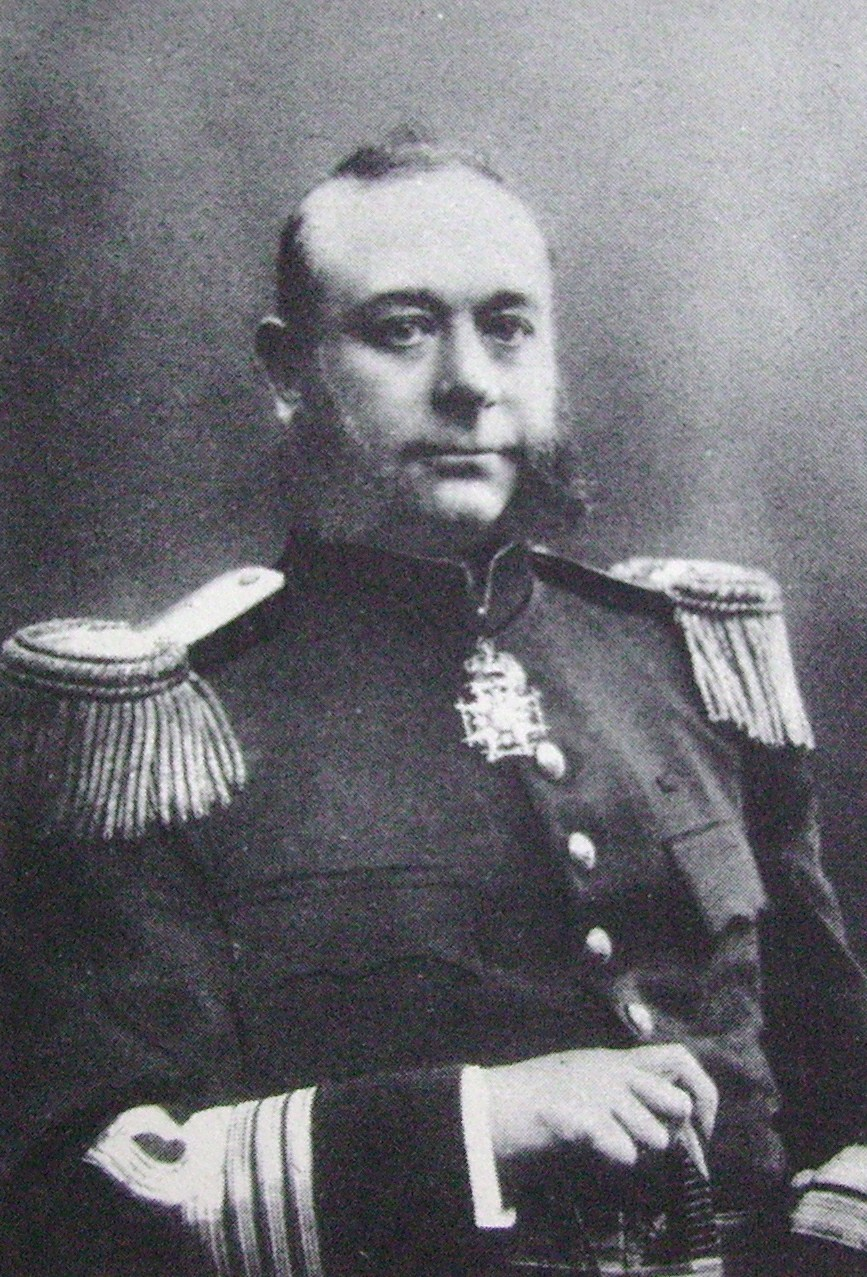
- Born: Otto Ludvig Beckman; 29 April 1856; Stockholm, Sweden
- Died: 27 June 1909 (aged 53); Stockholm, Sweden
- Burial place: Norra begravningsplatsen
- Military career
- Branch: Coastal Artillery (Swedish Navy)
- Service years: 1876–1909
- Rank: Major General
- Commands: Karlskrona Coastal Artillery Regiment; Coastal Artillery
- Awards: Order of the Sword

Major General Otto Ludvig Beckman (29 April 1856 – 27 June 1909) was a Swedish Navy officer and commanding officer of the Swedish Coastal Artillery. He was assassinated during Tsar Nicholas II's visit to Stockholm in 1909.

== Early life ==
Beckman was born on 27 June 1909 in Stockholm, Sweden.

== Career ==
Beckman began his career as a underlöjtnant in the Swedish Navy in 1876 and was promoted to lieutenant in 1881 and captain in 1888. He was a teacher at the Royal Swedish Naval Academy from 1889 to 1891 and was head of the Naval Mine Department at the naval station in Karlskrona from 1891 to 1901. Beckman was promoted to commander of second rank in 1897 and first rank in 1900. He was a member of the Executive Board of the Fleet's Retirement Fund from 1899. Beckman was promoted to colonel and commander of Karlskrona Coastal Artillery Regiment (KA 2) as well as artillery commander of Karlskrona Fortress in 1902. In 1907, Beckman was promoted to major general and became commander of the Coastal Artillery. He was a long-standing member of Karlskrona City Council and deputy chairman of the city treasury.

He was a member of the Defence Committee in 1907. Beckman was also an honorary member of the Royal Swedish Society of Naval Sciences.

== Assassination ==
During Czar Nicholas II's visit to Stockholm in 1909 the anarchist Hjalmar Wång tried to assassinate the czar. He failed, however, and killed Beckman instead. It was after a banquet at the Royal Palace, when Beckman and his colleagues made a short visit to the Grand Hôtel. Ten minutes after midnight on the 27 June he walked, dressed in parade uniform, through Kungsträdgården. There he met Wång who shot him in the back. Right after, the 22-year-old Wång shot himself in the head twice. Wång died the next morning from his injuries. Commander P. Dahlgren who was walking with Beckman escaped without injures. The passer-by, feldsher Levander, was hit by a bullet but survived. Beckman was buried on the 2 July 1909 at Norra begravningsplatsen in Solna Municipality.

== Personal life ==
Beckman was married to Olga Maria Högsted (born 1861). They had three sons, lieutenant colonel Per Evald Ottocar Beckman (1885–1962), commander Sven Alfred Ottocar Beckman (1887–1962), and district judge Herbert Ottokar Beckman (1893–1981), and one daughter, rector Olga Elsa Beckman (1888–1975).

== Dates of rank ==
- 1876 – Underlöjtnant (Navy)
- 1881 – Sub-lieutenant
- 1888 – Lieutenant
- 1897 – Lieutenant commander
- 1900 – Commander
- 1902 – Colonel (Coastal Artillery)
- 1907 – Major general

== Awards and decorations ==
- (Sweden) Commander 1st Class of the Order of the Sword (16 June 1908)
- (Sweden) Commander 2nd Class of the Order of the Sword (1 December 1904)
- (Sweden) Knight 1st Class of the Order of the Sword (1896)

== Honours ==
- Member of the Royal Swedish Society of Naval Sciences (1891)
- Member of the Royal Swedish Academy of War Sciences (1901)

Military offices
Preceded by Anders Fredrik Centerwall	Swedish Coastal Artillery; 1907–1909	Succeeded by Herman Wrangel
