= Karlskrona Coastal Artillery Regiment =

- Karlskrona kustartilleriregemente
- Active: 1902–2000
- Country: Sweden
- Allegiance: Swedish Armed Forces
- Branch: Swedish Navy
- Type: Coastal artillery
- Size: Regiment
- Part of: MDS (1902–1942); I. Milo (1942–1966); Milo S (1966–1980); BK (1980–1994); Milo S (1994–2000)
- Garrison/HQ: Karlskrona
- Colors: Blue, yellow and red
- March: "Kungl Karlskrona kustartilleriregementes marsch" (Sjögren) (Note: The march was adopted and established on 1 April 1910.)

Insignia
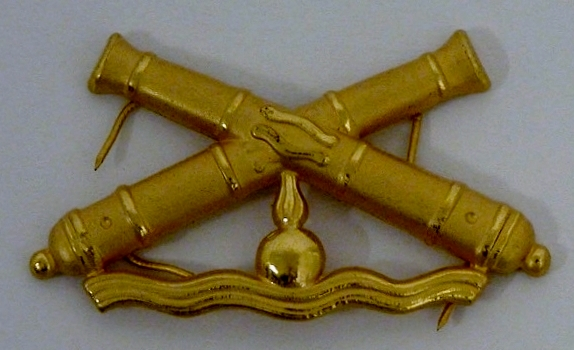
- Branch insignia

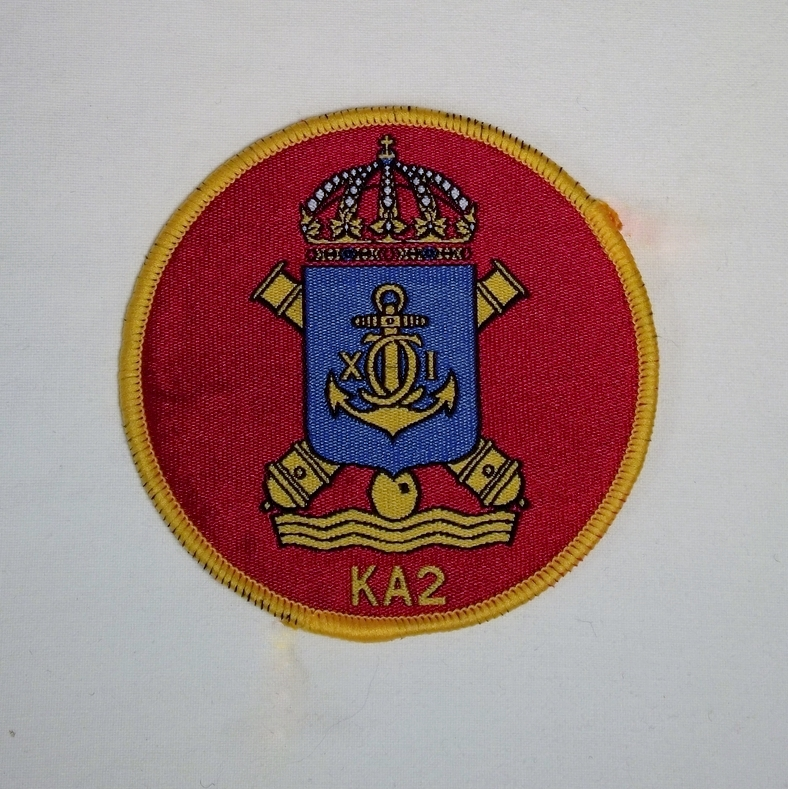
- Shoulder sleeve insignia

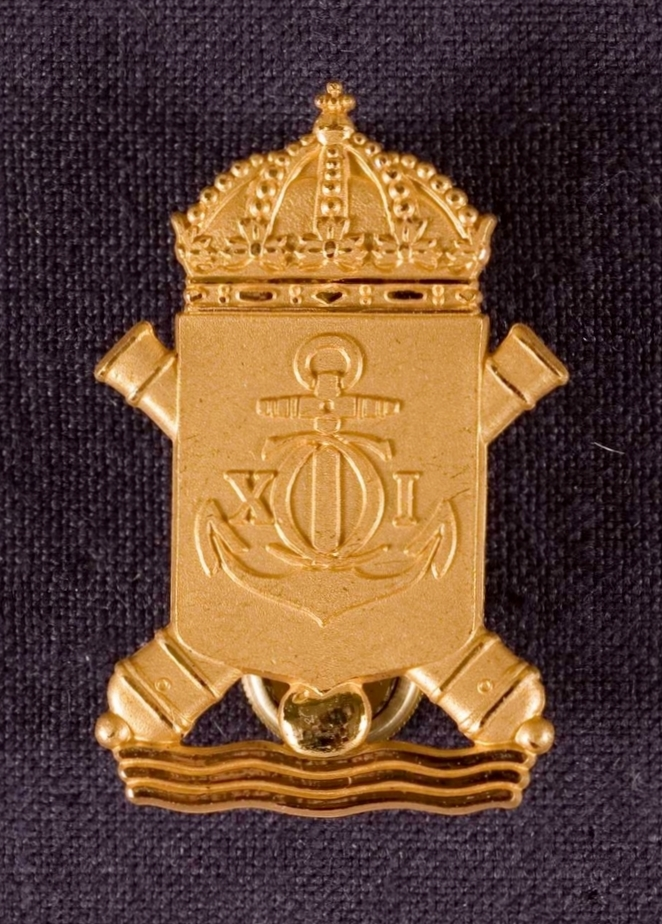
- Cap badge

The Karlskrona Coastal Artillery Regiment (Swedish: Karlskrona kustartilleriregemente), designation KA 2, was a Swedish Navy coastal artillery regiment of the Swedish Armed Forces which operated between 1902 and 2000. The unit was based in Karlskrona.

== History ==
=== Formation of Swedish Coastal Artillery (1890–1902) ===
As early as the 1890s, there were discussions about unifying artillery corps under a single command as a distinct military branch. In 1892, a committee working on the organization of the Karlskrona Artillery Corps highlighted the benefits of standardization between coastal fortress artillery units, suggesting that merging them into a single coastal artillery force would be feasible. By 1898, a joint gunnery school was established for both army and navy fortress artillery units. A significant military exercise in Karlskrona in 1900 was groundbreaking, as it involved naval forces, fixed mine defences, the Karlskrona Artillery Corps, and the Blekinge Battalion in joint operations, ensuring the integration of all functions within the Karlskrona fortress.

In 1897 and 1898, articles published in Tidskrift i Sjöväsendet advocated for a unified coastal artillery branch under a single command. One of the authors was likely Anders Fredrik Centerwall, the commander of Karlskrona Artillery Corps. Despite editorial skepticism about the necessity of such a reform, it was acknowledged that the issue required further investigation. The 1897 Fortification Committee also examined the idea of a unified coastal defence organization, arguing it should be part of the naval forces. However, their report did not mention the role of fixed mine defences. Colonel Centervall, among others, critiqued the committee's findings, particularly regarding personnel matters. He proposed a structure with a single inspector overseeing naval fortress artillery, along with two artillery regiments in Vaxholm and Karlskrona, incorporating fixed mine defences.

In November 1899, the Minister of War Hjalmar Palmstierna requested the Swedish King to establish a committee to examine the formation of a coastal artillery force. At the time, the fortifications in Vaxholm and Gothenburg were under the army, while those in Karlskrona and Fårösund were under the navy. The committee's directives included:

- Transferring the Vaxholm Artillery Corps to the navy and merging it with the Karlskrona Artillery Corps to form the coastal artillery.
- Placing specific naval fortifications entirely under naval command.
- Moving fixed mine defenses to coastal artillery control.
- Managing coastal artillery personnel through the same administrative body as the navy.
- Using Karlskrona’s naval shipyard as a model for coastal artillery logistics.

Colonel Oskar Sylvander, commander of the Vaxholm Artillery Corps, chaired the committee, which included notable members such as Lieutenant Commander Otto Ludvig Beckman, who later became the first commander of the KA 2 regiment. A separate review committee, including Colonel Centervall, was also established to evaluate the proposals. In 1901, the Swedish parliament endorsed the coastal artillery committee’s recommendations, leading to the formal creation of a coastal artillery force. King Oscar II signed the royal decree on 1 November 1901, establishing the Royal Karlskrona Coastal Artillery Regiment, effective from 1 January 1902.

== Locations ==
=== Vallgatan (1902–1943) ===
When KA 2 was raised on 1 January 1902, the regiment took over the area on Vallgatan, which since 1895 has been used by Karlskrona Artillery Corps. The Artillery Corps was raised in 1893 and from the beginning had its main location at Kungsholmen with units located at Oscarsvärn and at Västra Hästholmen. The units, which had to man the fortifications before the artillery corps, had from the beginning been on Kungsholmen and Drottningskär. Västra Hästholmen and Oscarsvärn became permanent places around 1870 at the same time as Drottningskär was de-manned. In 1895, the barracks at Vallgatan were completed (Northern Barracks) and shortly thereafter the so-called Underofficershuset with housing for the non-commissioned officers of the Artillery Corps. Furthermore, the Exercishuset was built immediately west of the barracks. In order to build these buildings, large parts of Erik Dahlbergh's fortress wall from the early 18th century had to be demolished. Where the main entrance to the area was located, in the middle of the Northern barracks, once stood the Achilles bastion, the second bastion from the east, in Dahlbergh's fortifications.

KA 2 was almost immediately cramped and the planning and work on another barracks took off. In 1905, the Southern Barracks, was completed and in order to be able to build it one had to demolish the Naval Shipyard's old arsenal from the 1730s. A new arsenal was built at the same time as the Southern Barracks. This was much further south than the old one. Parallel to the city barracks on Vallgatan, among other things, the outer installations were used the same way as the Artillery Corps had used them. Exterior changes hardly happened as long as KA 2 remained on site. The interiors were changed that characterized the first half of the 20th century (electricity, water supply, central heating, etc.). In 1943 KA 2 left Vallgatan and headed north towards Gräsvik. The move came after a lengthy procedure. The Flottans sjömansskola ("Swedish Navy Seaman's School") was to be established in Karlskrona and the issue was long between this school and KA 2 about Gräsvik. It was KA 2 that got Gräsvik and in August 1943, the regiment left Vallgatan and moved north. The chief spokesman for the move was undoubtedly the then regimental commander, colonel Gösta Möller.

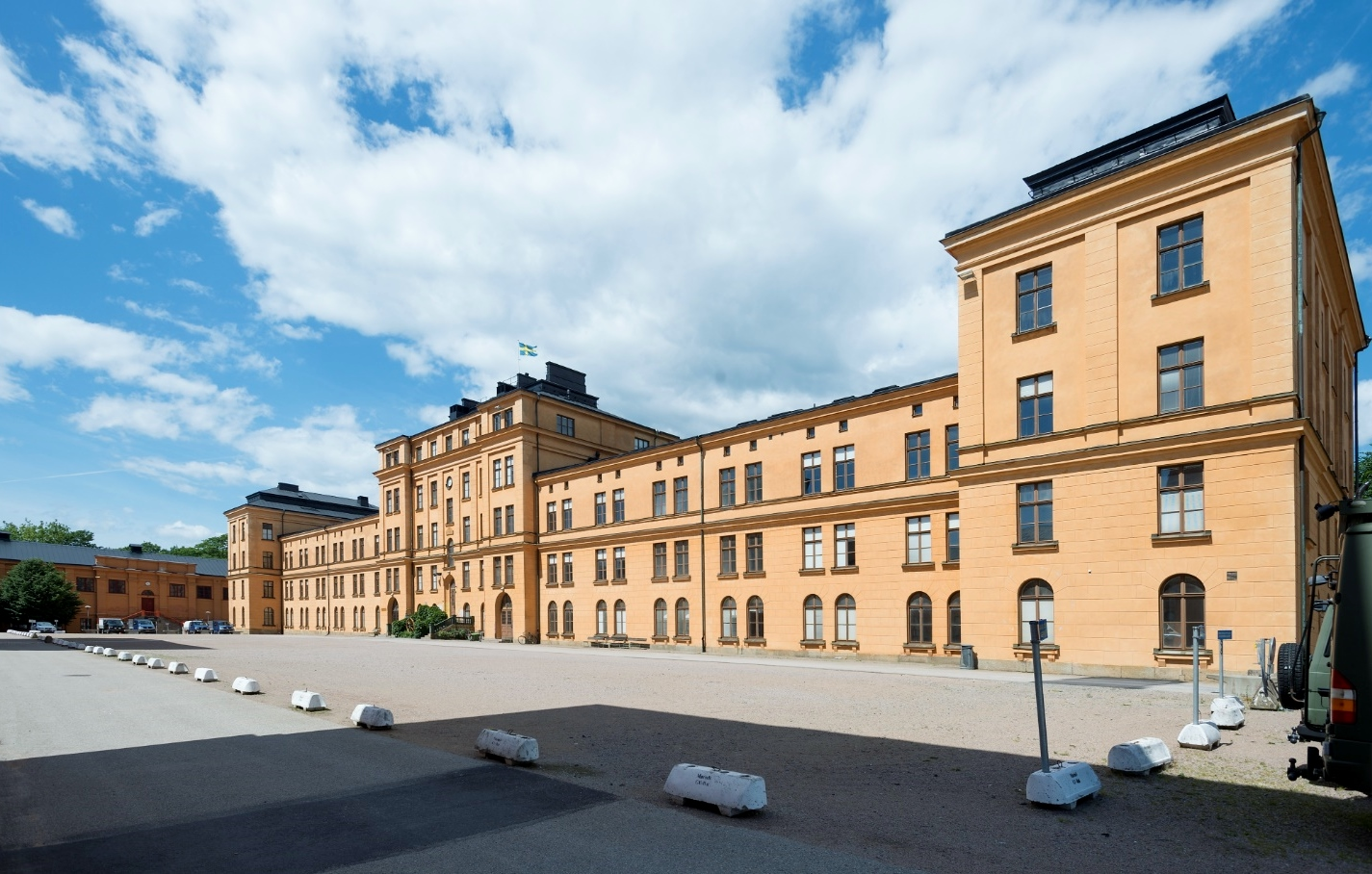
Southern Barracks (Jarramas)

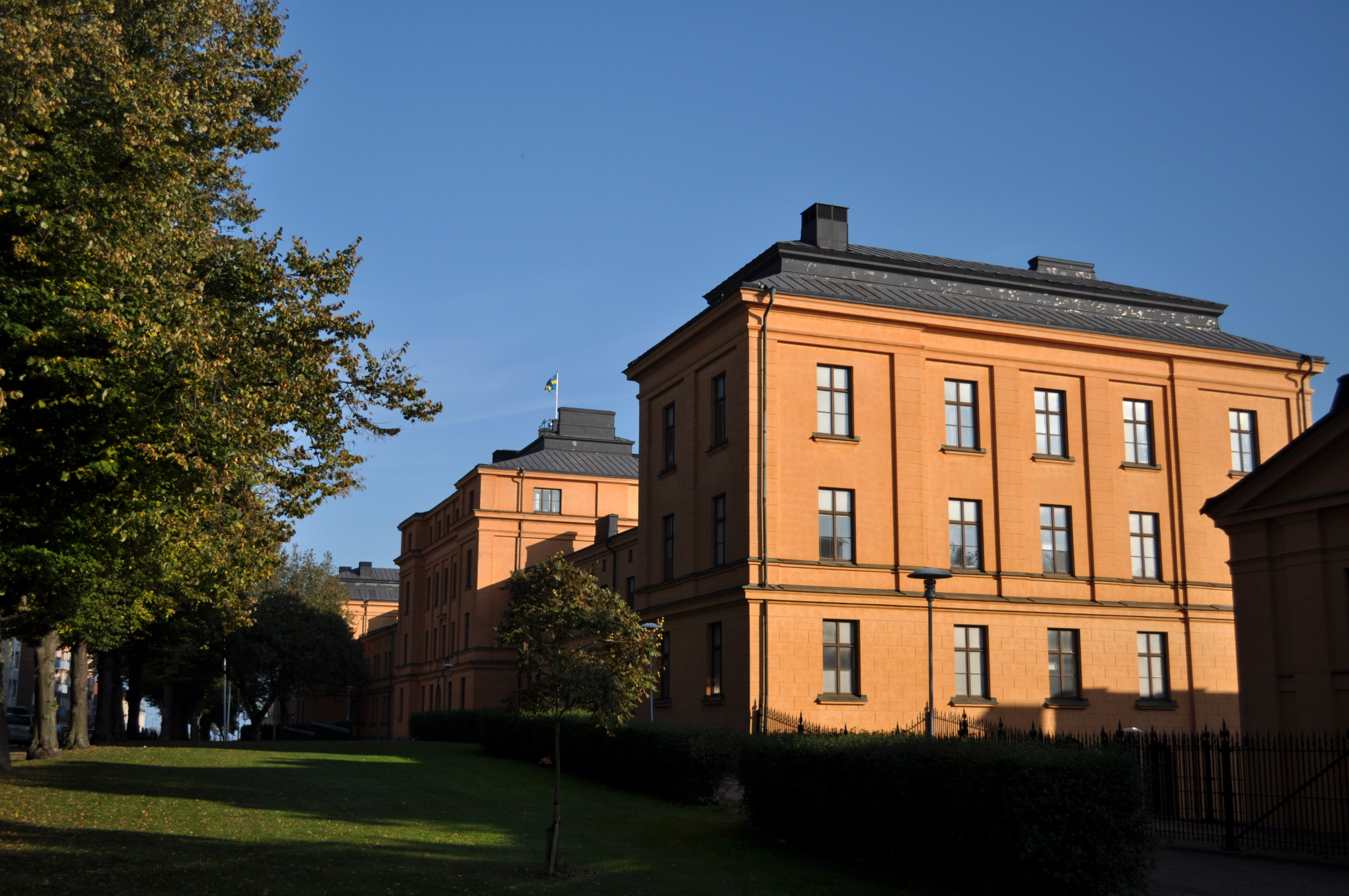
Bataljon af Trolle

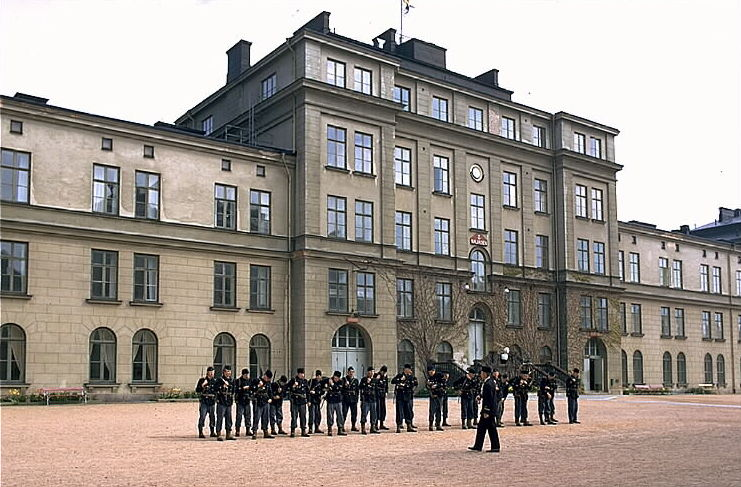
Bataljon af Trolle

=== Oscarsvärn (1902–1973) ===
The area between the Sunna Canal and the current Oscarsvärnsvägen, originally called Hvita Krog, began to be fortified in 1709. The fortifications, called Oscarsvärnslinjerna, received its first peace-time crew in 1896, when Karlskrona Artillery Corps's 4th Company was placed here. When Karlskrona Coastal Artillery Regiment was raised in 1902, the tasks of this unit were taken over and Oscarsvärn became the location and training area for KA 2's mobile artillery and vehicle training. This training moved to Rosenholm in the fall of 1973 and Oscarsvärn were handed over to Karlskrona Municipality on 6 December 1973. In connection with this, a stone was erected with a plaque commemorating the military activities at Oscarsvärn.

=== Gräsvik (1943–1981) ===
The Defence Act of 1925 meant a proper disarmament of the Swedish Armed Forces. One of the regiments that was affected was Karlskrona Grenadier Regiment which was disbanded on 31 December 1927. On 1 January 1928, the Karlskrona Grenadier Regiment was replaced by a detachment from Kronoberg Regiment (I 11 K). The strength was at its peak at around 1,000 men. In essence, the Northern Barracks was used as accommodation. The Defence Act of 1936 meant that I 11 K would be disbanded, but before the decision was enforced, World War II began. Despite this, the disbandment was completed and on 26 September 1939, a solemn disbandment ceremony was held at Gräsvik. In connection with Germany's occupation of Denmark and Norway, the landstorm was drafted to set up shore defense battalions and to be responsible for certain air surveillance. These were placed in the empty Gräsvik barracks. Karlskrona Coastal Artillery Regiment, which was located on Vallgatan, was too crowded and had been for many years. After a necessary and thorough renovation, which took place in 1942–1943, the regiment moved in in August 1943. As early as 1942, KA 2's mobile preparedness units had disposed of the barracks on the upper floor, when they occasionally returned from preparedness service. The barracks were used only for accommodation. Other activities took place at Oscarsvärn. After KA 2 took Gräsvik into possession, a certain number of additions and rebuilds took place. In general, however, the facility remained unchanged, at least to its exterior. New buildings that were completed were the canteen building at Dannemarksfjärden in 1946, remodeling and extension of the gun hall on the upper floor to the Mechanics School and a new vehicle and machinery hall in the 1970s. Otherwise, the old buildings from the time of the Karlskrona Grenadier Regiment were used, where the oldest, the non-commissioned officers' mess and the clothing storage, had been moved to the site from Bredåkra. In the spring of 1980, the Eastern Barracks was leased to Karlskrona Municipality to accommodate parts of the upper secondary school. Eventually, the Northern Barracks for a short time also became a secondary school undergoing redevelopment on Trossö. On 23 October 1981, the naval ensign on Gräsvik was lowered for the last time at a simple ceremony. Smaller parts of the regiment remained until 1983-1984 and the following year the area was sold with buildings to Karlskrona Municipality.

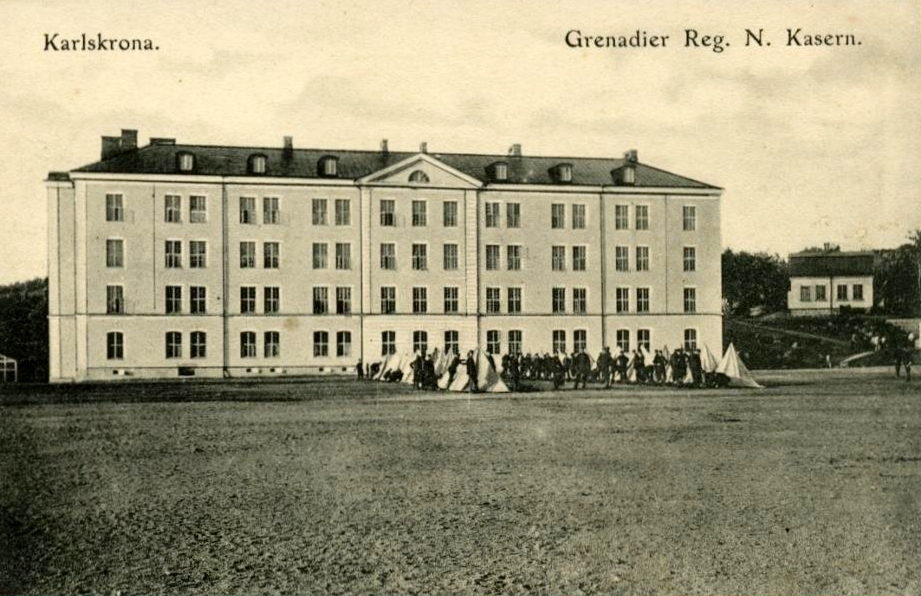
Northern Barracks in 1912.

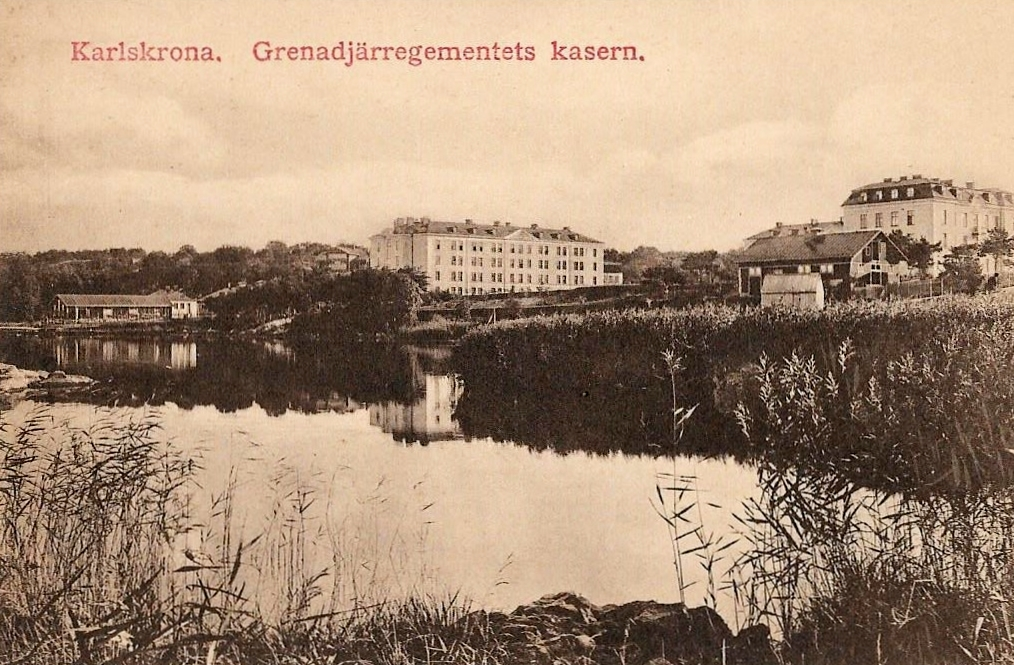
Barracks during 1910/1920s

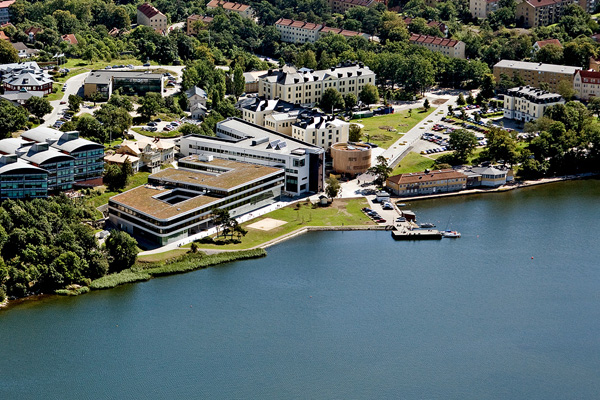
Aerial photo of the barracks in Gräsvik in 2010

=== Rosenholm (1973–2000) ===
In 1915, the military activities in the Rosenholms area started, when the farms Rosenholm and Silletorp were purchased on behalf of the Swedish crown. The acquisition was the result of Karlskrona Grenadier Regiment (I 7) being expanded from two to three battalions during the World War I. The regiment exercised in the area until 1927, when a detachment from Kronoberg Regiment (I 11 K) took over the area and remained there until September 1939. During the first years of World War II, the area was used as a location and training area for the drafted Landstormen. KA 2 also disposed the field and during World War II, it was mainly the mobile coastal artillery units that utilized the Rosenholms area during their recovery periods. The Swedish Navy also carried out ground combat exercises in Rosenholm during certain periods. Until the end of the 1960s, the Swedish crown had only the area south of the Silletorpsån. In 1967, three properties were purchased north of Silletorpsån, Måstad, Stenshaga and Bubbetorp. The training area thus increased from 2.7 km^{2} to 7 km^{2}, a need caused by the decision to change conscription training (VU 60). At the same time, the first new building, the missile school, was being built. In 1972, new construction of barracks and military restaurant buildings commenced, and when this first stage was completed, KA 2 left Oscarsvärn in autumn 1973. In Rosenholm, extensive construction work continued into the 1990s. In 1981 the majority of the regiment moved from Gräsvik to Rosenholm and in 1983 the regimental staff moved in.

== Heraldry and traditions ==
=== Colours, standards and guidons ===
The regimental colour was presented to the former Royal Karlskrona Coastal Artillery Regiment (KA 2) at the Stockholm Palace in Stockholm by His Majesty the King Gustaf V on 1 June 1945. It was used as regimental colour by KA 2 until 1 July 2001. The regimental commander, Colonel Alf Nyman, received the colour from the hands of the king. In connection with the disbandment ceremony on 31 October 2000, the colour was handed over to the South Coast Naval Base, which is the unit that will carry forward the traditions of the Karlskrona Coastal Artillery Regiment.

The regimental colour was drawn by Brita Grep and embroidered by hand in insertion technique by the company Libraria. Blazon: "On red cloth in the centre the badge of the former Coastal Artillery; two gunbarrels of older pattern in saltire between a royal crown proper and a blazing grenade and waves, all in yellow. In the first corner the monogram of HM King Carl XI surmounting an erect anchor under a royal crown proper, all in yellow".

=== Coat of arms ===
The coat of arms of the Karlskrona Coastal Artillery Regiment (KA 2) was established in 1967. Blazon: "Azure, The monogram of King Charles XI surmounted an erect anchor. The shield surmounted two gunbarrels of older pattern in saltire above a flaming grenade and waves, all or."

=== Marches ===
"Kongl Carlskrona artillerikårs marsch" was written in 1895 by Frans Ferdinand Heimdahl (1848–1929) and was adopted the same year. Heimdahl was music director in Karlskrona Artillery Corps from 1895 to 1901, at the Royal Swedish Navy Band in Karlskrona from 1874 to 1914 and in Halland Battalion from 1897 to 1901. When Karlskrona Coastal Artillery Regiment was raised in 1902, the march became the regimental march and remained so until 31 March 1910. In 1992, the march was adopted as a march for the Karlskrona Marine Group (Karlskrona maringrupp) and as such was maintained until the unit's disbandment in 1996. In 2001, the march was again adopted as a unit march, now for the Blekinge Archipelago Home Guard Battalion (Blekinge skärgårdshemvärnsbataljon).

"Kungl Karlskrona kustartilleriregementes marsch" was written in 1910 by the music director at KA 2, August Sjögren (1862–1929). The march was dedicated to the then regimental commander Carl Gustaf Ahlborn, and was adopted as a unit march on 1 April 1910. The march came to remain the regimental march until the disbandment on 31 October 2000. Sjögren served as music director in the regiment from 1905 to 1918.

"KA 2 marschvisa" was added in 1942. The music was composed by Sven-Gösta Elmqvist, reserve officer of the regiment and the text was written by the then lieutenant of the regiment Sven Olof (Ola) Träff, later self-employed and member of the Riksdag.

"Överste Gösta Möller" was written in 1943 by the music director of the regiment Bertil Driwing (1912–1991). The march was dedicated to the outgoing regimental commander Gösta Möller and received the subtitle "Ett lag eld", a regular fire command of the coastal artillery units.

"KA 2-kamrater" was written for KA 2 Kamratförening's 50th anniversary by Kjell Rosell (Larsson) (born 1912) and was handed over on the anniversary day 14 June to the then regimental commander and chairman of the Kamratförening, Colonel Roland Hultgren. Kjell Rosell was a musician in KA 2 from 1929 to 1935. His instruments were cornet and trumpet.

"KA 2 jubileumsmarsch" was written for KA 2's 90th anniversary in June 1992 by Eskil Nyström (born 1923). The march was dedicated to the then regimental commander Colonel Bengt-Arne Johansson. Eskil Nyström was a musician in KA 2 from 1943 until the disbandment of the music corps in 1957, when he was transferred to the Royal Swedish Navy Band in Karlskrona. His instruments were clarinet and saxophone. In the march there are loops of both "KA 2 marsch" and "KA 2 marschvisa".

"3. amfibiebataljonens marsch" is also a work by Eskil Nyström. This march was added in 1997, which was the first year when the entire amphibious system was trained in KA 2. The march was dedicated to the then amphibious battalion commander Günter Villman.

"Överste Villman" is also a work by Eskil Nyström and was originally written as an anniversary march for the regiment's 100th anniversary. When the decision to disband the regiment came, the march was renamed to "Överste Villman" and was dedicated to KA 2's last regimental commander, Colonel Günter Villman. In the march, "KA 2 igenkänningssignal" is heard, a few beats of the march song and a few beats of the "Blekingesången", the latter to mark the regiment as a real native regiment.

"KA 2 igenkänningssignal". The recognition signal is intended for clarion (B instrument).

=== Medals ===
In 2000, the Karlskrona kustartilleriregementes (KA 2) minnesmedalj ("Karlskrona Coastal Artillery Regiment (KA 2) Commemorative Medal") in silver (KarlskronakaregSMM) of the 8th size was established. The medal ribbon is of blue moiré with a broad yellow stripe on the middle followed on both sides by a red stripe.

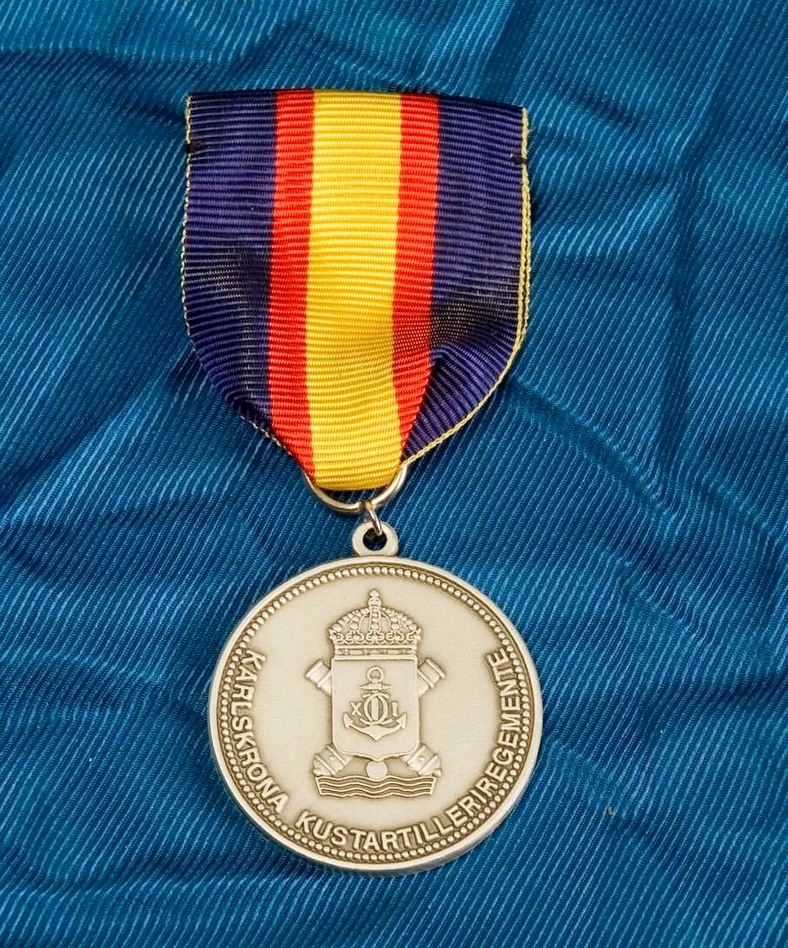
Commemorative Medal m/2000

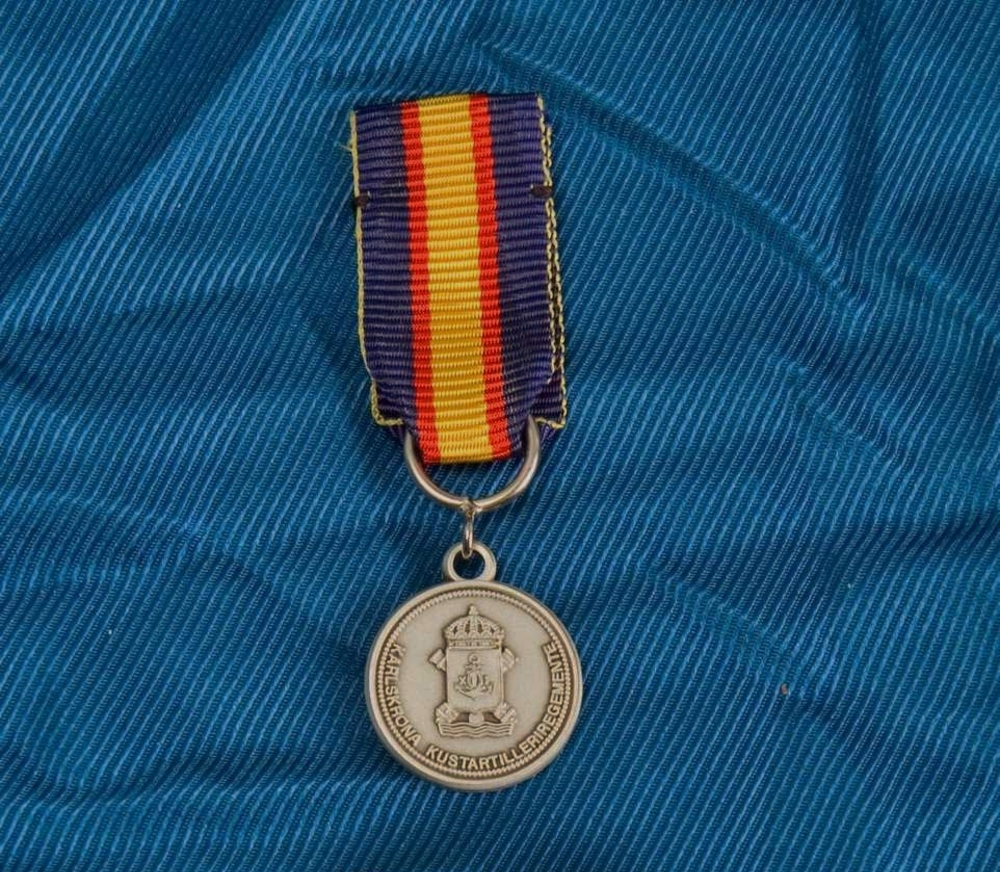
Miniature Commemorative Medal m/2000

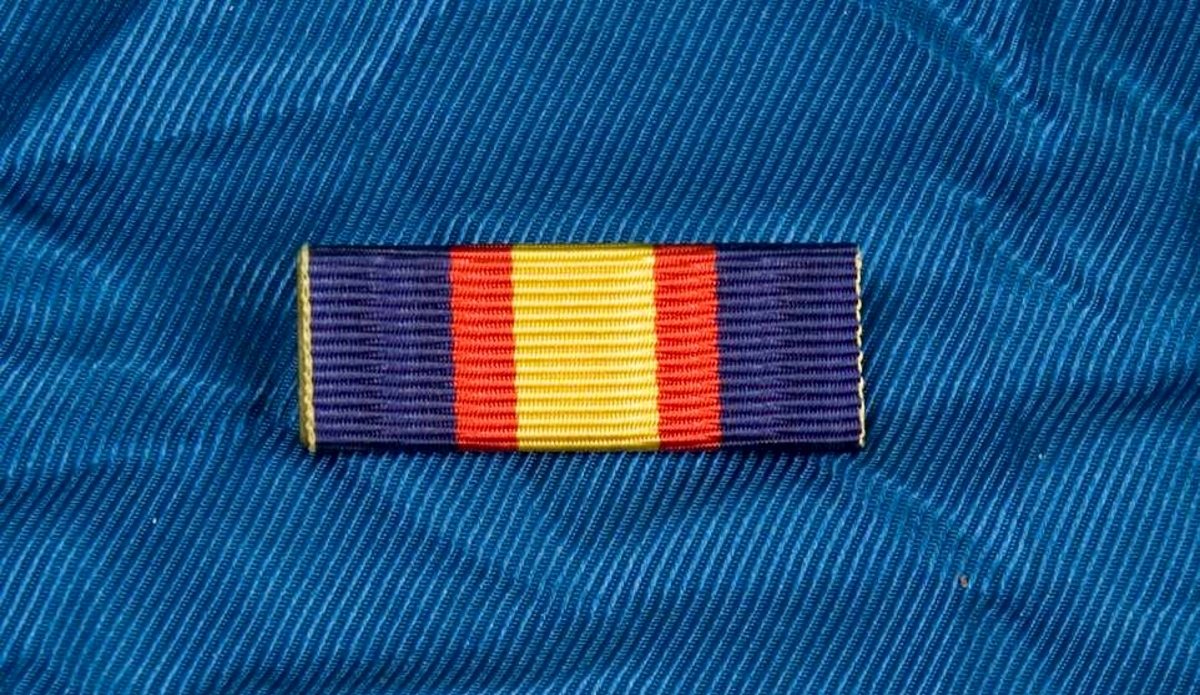
Medal ribbon

== Commanding officers ==
During the period that the Karlskrona Coastal Artillery Regiment existed, from 1 January 1902 to 31 October 2000, the regiment had 22 regimental commanders. In addition, there were 2 acting commanders who maintained the position for a longer period of time:

- 1902-01-01 – 1907-09-05: Otto Ludvig Beckman
- 1907-09-06 – 1914-12-01: Carl-Gustaf Ahlborn
- 1914-12-02 – 1924-10-14: Sam Torsten Rudolf Bolling
- 1924-10-15 – 1925-11-20: John Artur Edström
- 1925-12-01 – 1929-11-05: Lars Theodor Hasselgren
- 1929-11-06 – 1935-07-16: Hans Gustaf Malmberg
- 1940-04-30 – 1941-06-30: Carl Anders Claus (acting) (Note: Colonel Carl Anders Claus was acting regimental commander from 30 April 1940 to 30 June 1941. During this time, the ordinary regimental commander Hjalmar Åström held the post of acting regimental commander of Vaxholm Coastal Artillery Regiment (KA 1) and from 1 April 1941, as commander of the Swedish Coastal Artillery. Colonel Claus, however, continued as acting regimental commander until September 1941, when the new regimental commander colonel Gösta Möller took office.)
- 1935-07-17 – 1941-03-31: Hjalmar Åström
- 1941-07-01 – 1943-09-30: Gösta Möller
- 1943-10-01 – 1947-09-30: Alf Nyman
- 1947-10-01 – 1953-09-30: Sten Puke
- 1953-10-01 – 1962-06-01: Erik Nordling
- 1962-06-02 – 1962-09-30: Sven-Eril Bengtson (acting) (Note: Lieutenant Colonel Sven-Eril Bengtson was acting regimental commander from 2 June 1962 to 30 September 1962. The appointment was due to the death of ordinary regimental commander Erik Nordling after a lengthy illness on 1 June 1962. Before that, during the period of Colonel Nordling's illness, Sven-Eril Bengtson had maintained the position as deputy (tjänsteförrättande) regimental commander.)
- 1962-10-01 – 1963-09-30: Carl-Fredrik Gillberg
- 1963-10-01 – 1970-09-30: Birger Ehnrot
- 1970-10-01 – 1976-09-30: Olof Gäfvert
- 1976-10-01 – 1978-10-31: Lars Hansson
- 1978-11-01 – 1980-09-30: Stefan Furenius
- 1980-10-01 – 1982-01-31: Bengt Ekström
- 1982-02-01 – 1985-09-30: Kjell Lodenius
- 1985-10-01 – 1991-09-30: Roland Hultgren
- 1991-10-01 – 1994-06-30: Bengt-Arne Johansson
- 1994-07-01 – 1999-05-31: Göran Boijsen
- 1999-06-01 – 2000-10-31: Günter Villman

== Names, designations and locations ==
Name	Translation	From		To
Kungl. Karlskrona kustartilleriregemente	Royal Karlskrona Coastal Artillery Regiment	1902-01-01	–	1974-12-31
Karlskrona kustartilleriregemente	Karlskrona Coastal Artillery Regiment	1975-01-01	–	1980-06-30
Blekinge Kustartilleriförsvar och Karlskrona försvarsområde med Karlskrona kustartilleriregemente	Blekinge Coastal Artillery Defence and Karlskrona Defence District with Karlskrona Coastal Artillery Regiment	1980-07-01	–	1994-06-30
Fjärde kustartilleribrigaden med Karlskrona kustartilleriregemente	4th Coastal Artillery Brigade with Karlskrona Coastal Artillery Regiment	1994-07-01	–	1997-12-31
Karlskrona kustartilleriregemente med andra kustartilleribrigaden	Karlskrona Coastal Artillery Regiment with the 2nd Coastal Artillery Brigade	1998-01-01	–	2000-10-31
Avvecklingsorganisation	Decommissioning Organisation	2000-11-01	–	2001-06-30
Designation		From		To
KA 2		1902-01-01	–	1980-06-30
BK/KA 2		1980-07-01	–	1990-06-30
KAB 4/KA 2		1990-07-01	–	1997-12-31
KA 2		1998-01-01	–	2000-10-31
Location		From		To
Karlskrona Garrison		1902-01-01	–	2001-06-30

== See also ==
- List of Swedish coastal artillery regiments
