= Peter Hederstedt =

Swedish army officer

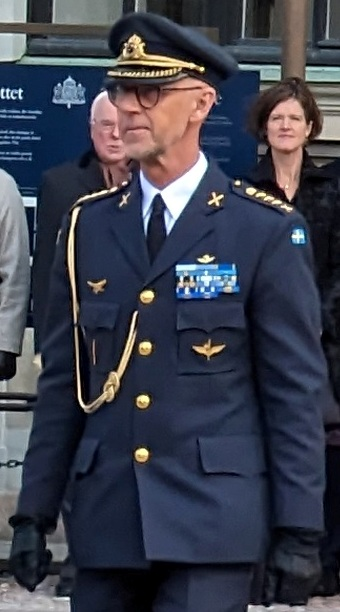
- Hederstedt in 2023
- Born: Lars Peter Mikael Hederstedt; 29 August 1963 (age 63); Skövde, Sweden
- Military career
- Allegiance: Sweden
- Branch: Swedish Army
- Service years: 1988–present
- Rank: Colonel
- Units: UNFICYP; UNIFIL
- Commands: Special Forces Command; Särskilda operationsgruppen; Western Military Region
- Conflicts: Cyprus dispute Lebanese Civil War; Kosovo War; Operation Artemis; War in Afghanistan

Colonel Lars Peter Mikael Hederstedt (born 29 August 1963) is a Swedish Army officer, currently serving as commander of the Western Military Region in Skövde since 2018. Hederstedt has a background in the Swedish special forces, and has served within Särskilda Skyddsgruppen (SSG) for 15 years, as deputy commander among other things. Hederstedt then served as the first commander of Särskilda operationsgruppen (SOG). He has also served in various staff positions at the Swedish Armed Forces Headquarters in Stockholm and abroad.

== Early life ==
Hederstedt was born 29 August 1963 in Skövde, Sweden, the son of General Johan Hederstedt. Hederstedt did his mandatory military service at the Gotland Regiment (P 18) in Visby in 1983. In 1984 Hederstedt did his first United Nations peacekeeping mission in Cyprus, part of the United Nations Peacekeeping Force in Cyprus (UNFICYP), as a squad leader. Back in Sweden he trained to be a reserve officer in the Swedish Armoured Troops and then did two more UN missions, in Cyprus and with United Nations Interim Force in Lebanon (UNIFIL) in Lebanon, as a platoon leader.

== Career ==
Hederstedt began his officer training at the Infantry and Cavalry Officers' College (Infanteriets och kavalleriets officershögskola, Inf/KavOHS) in Umeå in 1987. He was commissioned as an officer in 1988 and was assigned as a second lieutenant to the Life Regiment Hussars (K 3) in Karlsborg. He served in K 3 until 1994, where he was trained in anti-tank guided missile service, grenade launcher service and completed command training as an Airborne Ranger at the Swedish Army Paratroop School, among other things. In 1992 he also served in Australia for a few months, as an exchange officer. As a captain, Hederstedt was involved in establishing the special operations unit Särskilda Skyddsgruppen (SSG) in 1994, where he then served in various positions until 2010. From 2004 to 2006, Hederstedt underwent the management course at the Swedish Defence University and in 2016 he completed a bachelor's thesis in military science about the planning of the Swedish participation with special forces in Operation Artemis in the Democratic Republic of the Congo.

From 2006 to 2007, he served as deputy commander of the Special Forces Command (SFL) at the Swedish Armed Forces Headquarters in Stockholm. Hederstedt had also held international staff positions at the EU operational headquarters in Potsdam, Germany in 2006 and in Paris from 2007 to 2008 for the EU's efforts in Congo and Chad. As deputy commander of the SSG, he was tasked with merging the SSG and the Särskilda Inhämtningsgruppen (SIG) to form the Särskilda operationsgruppen (SOG). Hederstedt was appointed the unit's first commander 2011–2015. He was promoted to colonel in 2013. Within the special forces, he has carried out operations, in various command positions, in Kosovo, Afghanistan and the Democratic Republic of the Congo.

On 1 August 2015, Hederstedt became head of the Experience and Analysis Department in the Joint Forces Command (Insatsstaben, INSS) at the Swedish Armed Forces Headquarters. On 15 August 2016, Hederstedt became head of the International Relations Section in the Policy and Plans Department in the Defence Staff. He was also appointed as one of His Majesty's aide-de-camp's on duty in 2015. On 1 January 2018, Hederstedt took command of the Western Military Region in Skövde. In early 2020, Hederstedt's appointment was extended to 31 December 2023. In mid-2023, Hederstedt's appointment was extended to 31 August 2024. In early 2024, his appointment was extended again, to 31 August 2026.

== Personal life ==
Hederstedt lives in Skövde and has two sons, Jonathan (born 2004) and Hampus (born 2006). Besides work, he likes to play golf.

== Dates of rank ==
- 1988 – Second lieutenant
- ???? – Lieutenant
- ???? – Captain
- ???? – Major
- ???? – Lieutenant colonel
- 2013 – Colonel

== Awards and decorations ==
=== Swedish ===
- (Sweden) H. M. The King's Medal, 8th size gold (silver-gilt) medal worn on the chest suspended by the Order of the Seraphim ribbon (28 January 2020)
- (Sweden) For Zealous and Devoted Service of the Realm
- (Sweden) Swedish Armed Forces Conscript Medal
- etc

=== Foreign ===
- United Nations Medal (UNFICYP)
- United Nations Medal (UNIFIL)
- etc

Military offices
Preceded by Bengt Alexandersson	Western Military Region; 2018–present	Succeeded by Incumbent
