= Special Forces Command (Sweden) =

- Specialförbandsledningen
- Active: 2000–present
- Country: (Sweden)
- Allegiance: Swedish Armed Forces
- Type: Special forces
- Size: Classified
- Garrison/HQ: Swedish Armed Forces Headquarters, Stockholm

Commanders
- Current commander: COL Andreas Odung

Insignia
- Command sign

The Special Forces Command (Swedish: Specialförbandsledningen, SFL) is a command in the Swedish Armed Forces charged with overseeing the various special operations components. Its organized to be able to command operations of Swedish special forces units, but also to be able to develop units, capabilities and equipment. The Special Forces Command is part of the Joint Forces Command (Insatsstaben, INSS).

== History ==
The Special Forces Command (SFL) was organized within the Joint Forces Command (OPIL) when it was formed in 2000 with responsibility for the special forces. At the same time, the Försvarsmaktens specialförband (FMSF) was formed consisting of SFL, SSG and FJS. The Special Forces Command is organized to be able to command operations of Swedish special forces units, but also to lead production of special forces operations and to be able to develop units, capabilities and equipment.

Today, the Special Forces Command is part of FMSF together with Särskilda operationsgruppen (SOG) as well as specially equipped, trained and equipped support units.

== Commanding officers ==
The Commander, Special Forces Command (C SFL) is part of Joint Forces Command (JFC) and has the task of commanding and coordinating the activities of the special forces.

=== Tasks ===
7 § The Commander, Special Forces Command shall, under the Chief of Joint Operations, exercise operational command and tactical command over the special forces during operations. 7 § The Commander, Special Forces Command shall, under the Commander, Swedish Armed Forces Special Forces (Försvarsmaktens specialförband, FM SF):

1. lead production of special forces,
2. propose the development of the capabilities of the special forces and military units,
3. be the main representative of the special forces, and
4. represent the special forces in national and international contacts.

9 § The Commander, Special Forces Command shall support the Chief of Defence Staff and prepare the documents or perform the duties of the Chief of Defence Staff or the head of the Swedish Armed Forces Headquarters decide within the framework of the Swedish Armed Forces Headquarters' operations.

=== Commanders ===
- 2005–2009: Colonel Hans Alm
- 2009–2017: Brigadier General (Note: Molin was promoted to brigadier general on 15 December 2013.) Urban Molin
- 2017-10-01–2021: Brigadier General Anders Löfberg
- 2021-09-01–2022: Colonel Robert Nylén (acting)
- 2022-03-31–present: Colonel Andreas Odung
