= Kustjägarna =

Ranger unit of the Swedish Amphibious Corps

202nd Coastal Ranger Company
- 202:a kustjägarkompaniet
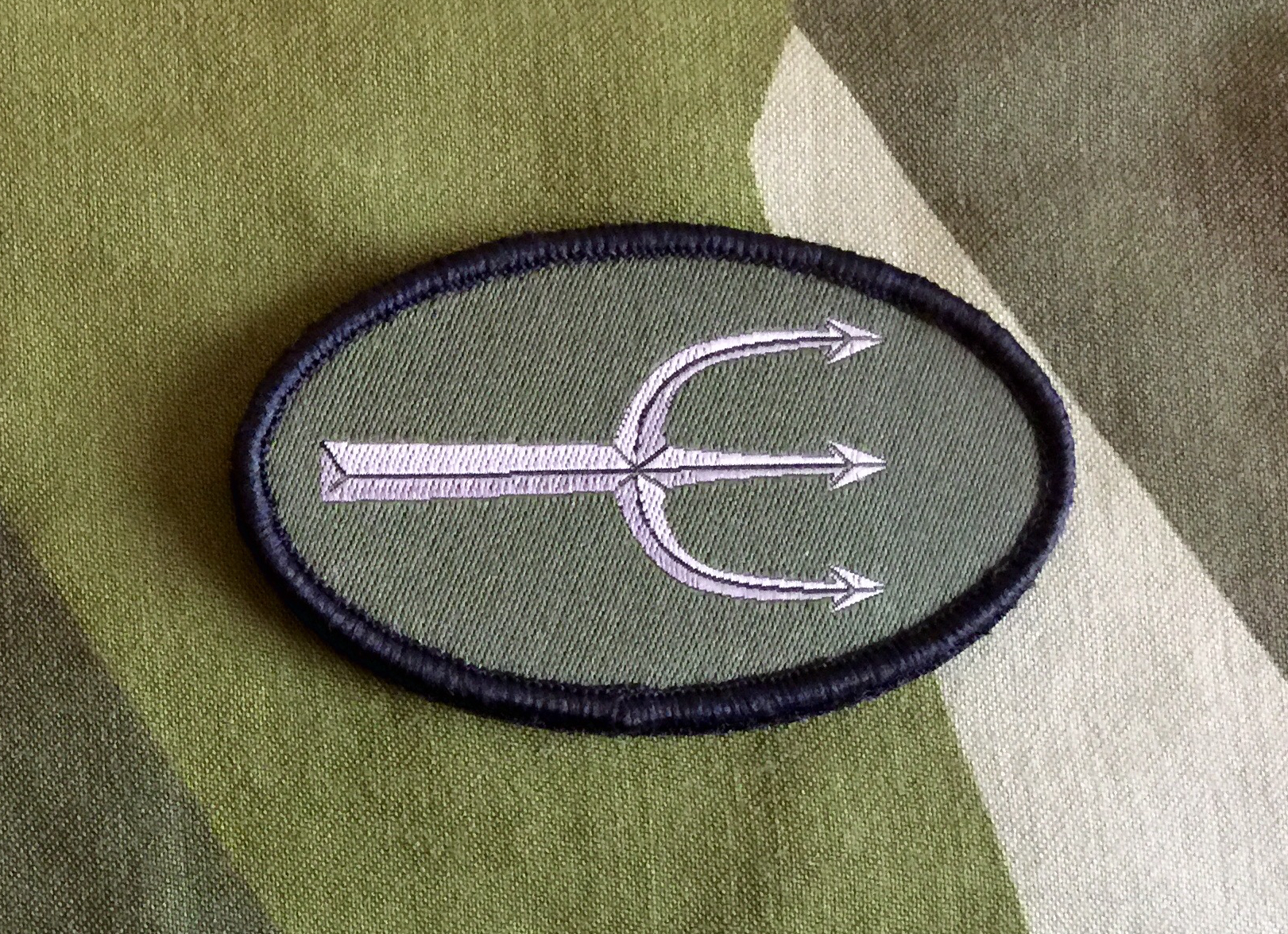
- The trident patch worn on the M90 field uniform.
- Founded: 15 September 1956; 69 years ago
- Country: Sweden
- Branch: Swedish Amphibious Corps
- Type: Special operations marine commando
- Role: Special reconnaissance; Sabotage; Unconventional warfare; Direct action; Amphibious reconnaissance
- Size: Company
- Part of: Amphibious Corps
- Garrison/HQ: Berga, Stockholm
- Nicknames: KJ, KJK (Note: KJ = Kustjägarna, the Coastal Rangers KJK = Kustjägarkompaniet, the Coastal Ranger Company)
- Mottos: Mod, Kraft, Spänst ("Courage, Power, Vitality")
- March: "Den svenske kustjägaren" (Tore Andersson)
- Anniversaries: 15 September (Note: The coastal rangers were formed on 15 September 1956, when Coastal Artillery Order 77 was issued, which meant that experimental training of coastal rangers began. 15 September is celebrated every year as the Day of the Coastal Rangers (Kustjägardagen).)
- Engagements: KFOR; EUFOR Tchad/RCA; EUNAVFOR; War in Afghanistan; Northern Mali conflict

Commanders
- Notable commanders: COL Per Carleson; LTGEN Torsten Engberg

Insignia
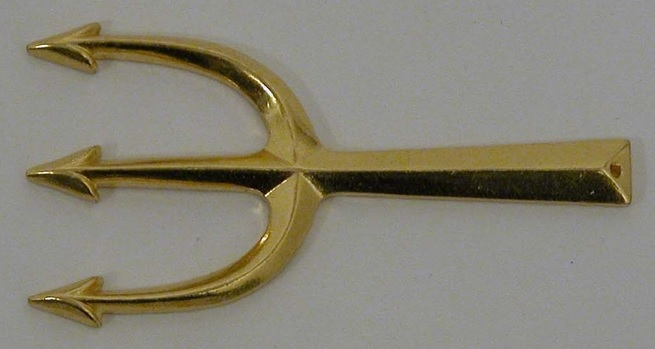
- Insignia

The 202nd Coastal Ranger Company (Swedish: 202. kustjägarkompaniet, or Kustjägarna, KJ) is a marine commando (special operations capable) unit within the Swedish Amphibious Corps, which is the infantry component of the Swedish Navy.

== History ==
The embryo for the formation of the coastal rangers began with a discussion at the Coastal Artillery Club (Kustartilleriklubben) on 4 December 1950. The introductory speech about commandos was made by Captain Bertil Stjernfelt. During the evening, three Swedish officers with war experience told the demands that should be placed on Swedish commandos. These three men were Lieutenant Colonel Malcolm Murray who commanded the 2nd Ranger Company of the Swedish Volunteer Corps at Hanko in Finland in 1941, Gösta Benckert with war experience from both Finland and Norway, and the paratrooper Erik G:son Lewenhaupt, with experience of fighting in Normandy, among other places.

The next step was the training of four Swedish officers at the Royal Marines and the French amphibious school in North Africa. One of these was the aforementioned Captain Bertil Stjernfelt, who was commanded to the British commando training. In 1952, the experimenting with what was first called närförsvarsmän ("close-in security men") began. At the same time as the coastal rangers took shape, the nearby combat divers (Attackdykarna, A-dyk) also began to set up. In Sweden, the history of combat divers is closely linked to that of both coastal rangers and the Röjdykare (Swedish Navy EOD). The Röjdykardivisionen was established in 1954 and trained in addition to clearance divers for just over a year also the first combat divers, after which the Swedish Fleet's diving school was responsible for that training until the fleet's combat divers were disbanded in 1979. Until then, there were combat divers in both the fleet and in the coastal rangers. Since then, only the coastal rangers' combat divers remain.

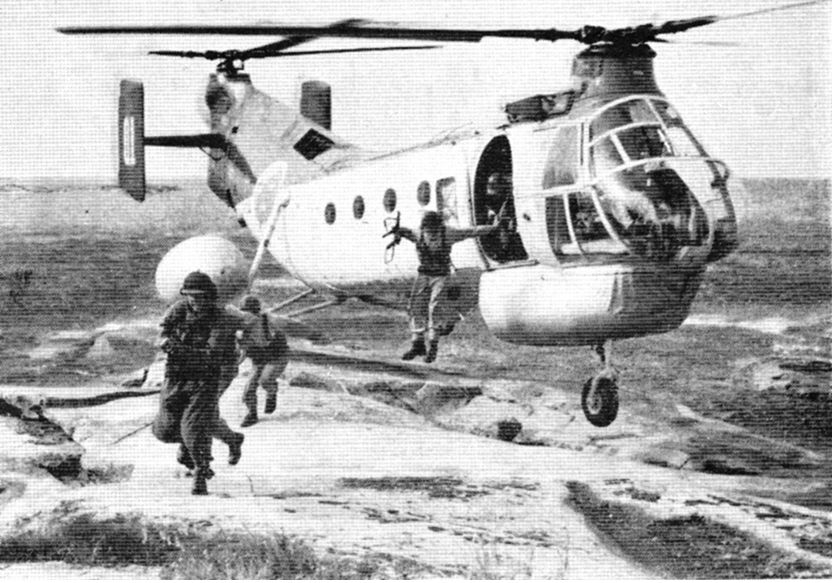
Coastal rangers jumps off a Piasecki H-21 helicopter in late 1950s.

In 1955, the Chief of the Navy, Vice Admiral Stig H:son Ericson received the Supreme Commander, General Nils Swedlund's permission for experimental training of coastal rangers. On 15 September 1956, Coastal Artillery Order No. 77 was issued, which meant that experimental training of coastal ranger would begin at KA 1's Närförsvarsskola ("Close-In Security School") in Vaxholm - three years later renamed the Coastal Ranger School (Kustjägarskolan). One of the instructors who in January 1957 received the first 89 coastal ranger aspirants was the first head of the Närförsvarsskolan, Captain Per Carleson, who had received special training at the French amphibious school in North Africa. Carleson's ideal instructor was, with his own words "skilful in hand-to-hand combat, skilled navigator of the archipelago, good at orienteering, preferably a frogman, knowledgeable signaler and artillery observer, and also strong, durable and provided with good judgment". In the autumn of 1957, General Swedlund personally inspected the Coastal Ranger School and approved further training. With the beginning of 1960, the coastal rangers became part of the Swedish war organization.

The Coastal Rangers were during the late parts of the Cold War used mainly as a very highly trained commando unit whose main tasks were amphibious warfare operations, coastal raiding, and commando style raids. Secondary tasks were long-range reconnaissance and sabotage behind enemy lines. Since the year 2000, however, the unit has been reorganized into its current organisation and is now composed of full-time professional personnel with emphasis on reconnaissance patrols behind enemy lines but still retain the capability to conduct direct action missions.

== Role ==
As a marines special operations capable forces, the main tasks of the Coastal Ranger are amphibious warfare operations, sabotage, commando style raids, VBSS operations, special warfare operations, and special reconnaissance for gathering field intelligence. They are experts in what is known internationally as brown-water or green-water operations that can be generally described as operations in areas where the ocean meets land. Archipelagos, river deltas, large rivers, and large lakes are examples of such areas.

The Coastal Ranger are trained at the 1st Marine Regiment which is headquartered at Berga Naval Base located in east central Sweden.

== Organization ==
The Coastal Ranger Company (KJK) is responsible for providing intelligence to the rest of the 1st Marine Regiment. The company is divided into two elements, the Assault/Commando element, and the frogmen Reconnaissance element (attackdykarna). While both elements are experts in deep reconnaissance, direct action, and long-range penetration, the Commando element is more oriented on direct action and irregular warfare than the Reconnaissance element, but the ability to conduct underwater insertions and the high stealth capability of the Reconnaissance element makes them the favourable choice for certain reconnaissance missions.

After the first two months of Coastal Ranger training, each individual belonging to the Commando and the Reconnaissance elements get specialized training depending on their assigned tasks in the teams. There are 4–8 members in every team and the different specializations are:

Team Leader: There is also a 2nd-in-command in the team, who assists the TL (Team Leader) and takes over if the commander is killed or injured.

Communications specialist: Responsible for the team's communications equipment and the communication with the higher command. He is also trained in encryption and laser guidance as he is the one that is in charge for guiding airstrikes and artillery to located enemy targets. The extra and heavy radio equipment requires the specialist to have excellent physical stamina, although, the load is normally rotated around the team.

Medic: Responsible for tending to wounds and injuries. He is a combatant and does not carry Red Cross-markings, and is excluded from the protection that article 9 in the First Geneva Convention offers to the International Red Cross "or any other impartial humanitarian organization" to provide protection and relief of wounded and sick soldiers. The medic receives 520 hours of emergency medical training and spends three weeks at a civilian hospital emergency room.

Demolitions expert: There are two demolition experts in every team. They are proficient with the use of explosive, land mine and naval mine. The purpose of the demolition experts is to give the teams the ability to conduct ambushes using mines, and to perform sabotage with explosives. They are trained on every mine system in the Swedish Armed Forces and how to employ them effectively. The demolitions experts also carry the team's main support weapon, the FN MINIMI.

Each company also has support assets, and these are:

Sniper/Spotter: The snipers work in pairs and are available as a company asset as a detachment to the Company HQ. Their job is to provide intelligence through reconnaissance, but can also eliminate high-value targets at long ranges.

Fire Support: Soldiers in the Fire Support Team are used to provide combined anti-armor and heavy weapon support to the ranger teams when more firepower is needed, such as during deliberate attacks. The Fire Support Team can also be used as a quick reaction force to call in as aid if one of the ranger teams get pinned down in enemy contacts.

== Selection and training ==
To be accepted to the very demanding basic Coastal Ranger course (roughly 12 months long), the candidate must already be serving member of the Armed Forces for at least one year, or have completed conscription. Applicants from all branches are accepted. The course is open to both sexes and women must meet the same standards as the men. In 2021, the first woman passed through the selection and training pipeline.

The applicant must pass the Coastal Ranger selection course which lasts for approx. three days where the candidates are tested on their fitness, endurance and dedication. They are also put through deep interviews with psychologists and unit officers. If the candidate is deemed fit for service with the unit then he may attend the Coastal Ranger basic course and then move on to specialize to a specific role within a patrol. During the course, the candidate will be put through a physically and mentally gruelling exercise called Övning Neptun (Eng. Exercise Neptune) which culminates in being awarded with the golden trident of Neptune, the unit insignia. Not until the candidate receives it can he call himself a Coastal Ranger. But before the candidate can attempt Exercise Neptune he must pass the following tests:

- Speed march: A 6.5-kilometer (4.0 mi) run with full webbing, assault pack, weapon, uniform and combat boots (20 kg) in formation and a correct pace within 40 minutes. The platoon runs together and if any candidate fails a speed march test then all recruits automatically fail that test. After the march a visitation is done of all the equipment and if anything is broken, of the wrong quantity or missing the whole troop fails. Even after all recruits have passed the test will it be used frequently as a way to keep the recruits in perfect physical condition.
- Obstacle course: A 5.5-kilometer (3.4 mi) obstacle course carrying the same gear as during the speed march test (20 kg). The obstacle course must be completed in less than 41 minutes and the candidates run in teams to emphasize teamwork (many of the obstacles are impossible to negotiate on your own). The candidates fail or succeed as a team, which means that all members of the team must complete the obstacle course within the time limit for anyone to pass the test.
- "Kayak Infiltration test and Survival Skill Test": The candidates must pass a 120 nautical miles (220 kilometres; 140 miles) kayak race which is done to simulate a long range infiltration with klepper kayaks in less than 48 hours. Immediately after completion of the race, the candidate must survive several days on a deserted island using the acquired survival skills.
- "Ski march during winter training": 50 km ski march with combatgear under 12 hours.

Attrition rates today are unknown.

== International involvement ==
The Coastal Rangers have been involved in low-intensity conflicts under UN flag, notably Kosovo and Bosnia, where they served as the intelligence platoon to KFOR, primarily working with personal based intelligence gathering. At the KS01 (HUMINT) operation in Kosovo a Coastal Ranger platoon relieved the Swedish Parachute Rangers. A substantial part of the unit deployed to Chad under EUFOR command in 2008. The Coastal Rangers have served on several rotations in Afghanistan, predominantly as Mobile Observation Teams, or as mentors embedded with the Afghan National Army. In 2015, personnel from the unit deployed to Mali as a part of the SWE ISR TF with the Army's 32nd Intelligence Battalion (ISTAR). In 2022 the unit was part of the Swedish contribution to the UN-MINUSMA mission in Mali. Snipers from the unit have also participated in EUNAVFOR off the coast of Somalia.

== Traditions ==
=== Insignia ===
==== Green beret ====
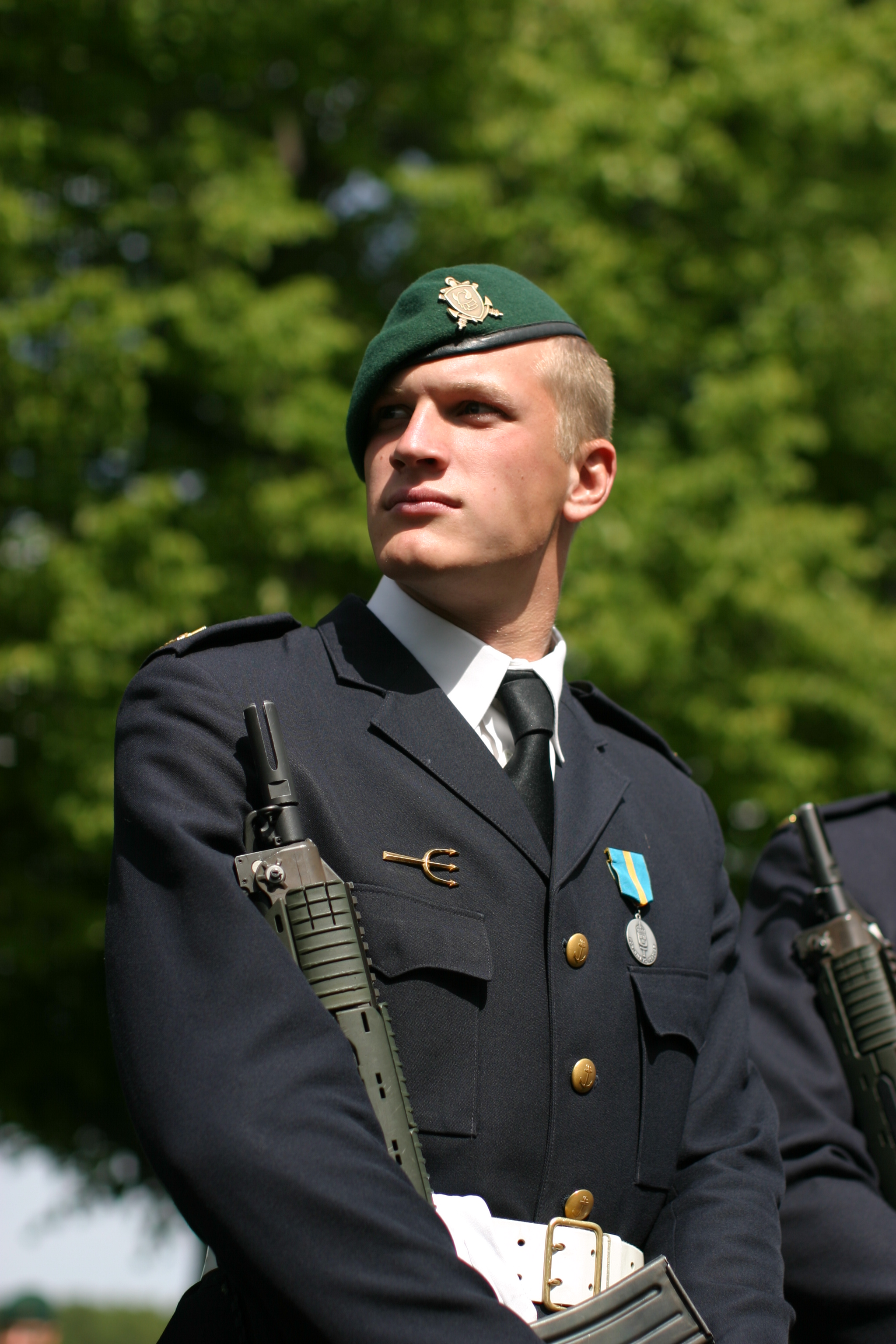
Coastal Ranger with the trident and green beret

The commando green beret is a common headdress of the Swedish Amphibious Corps modelled on the Royal Marine Commandos' headdress, as the British commandos were a major influence on the formation of Coastal Rangers. Until 1994, the green beret was exclusive to the Coastal Rangers and was awarded for successfully completing Operation Neptune along with the trident cap badge. But as the rest of the amphibious battalion too were allowed to wear the beret (without trident), the Rangers exchanged the cap badge for the uniform patch as their unit insignia. (Originally, members of the Marine infantry battalion as well as the Coastal Rangers had to complete Exercise Amfibie to qualify for wearing the green beret without trident, but nowadays it is worn by any personnel attached to the amphibious battalion who has completed Exercise Thorleif.)

==== Neptune Trident ====
The unit's insignia (förbandstecken) is the "golden trident". Originally it was worn as cap badge on the beret, but in 1994 Coastal Rangers officially exchanged their cap badge for a patch worn on the M/90 field uniform and the M/87 dress uniform as unit insignia, however the class of 1994 still managed by their own initiative to receive it as a cap badge instead, thus becoming the last class to receive it as such. As a result, the class of 1994 became the only Coastal Ranger in history to both wear the trident in their berets and as a patch on their uniforms simultaneously. As the golden trident is awarded for successfully passing the Coastal Ranger course, it may be worn also by personnel from other units who passed the course, whereas the uniform badge is worn exclusively by members of the Coastal Rangers.

=== March ===
The units own march is "Den svenske kustjägaren" by Tore Andersson (born 1937) from Olofström, adopted in 1975. Andersson served as quartermaster at a military exercise with a coastal ranger company in 1974 and dedicated the march to the then company commander Per-Axel Eliasson. "Den svenske kustjägaren" has been recorded by, among others, the Royal Swedish Navy Band. Andersson was awarded the Coastal Ranger Medal in 2006 for his contribution to the coastal ranger's cultural heritage.

== Commanding officers ==
Commanders of the Kustjägarskolan ("Coastal Ranger School"):

- 1956–1957: Per Carleson (as commander of Närförsvarsskolan (NärfS))
- 1957–1959: Sven-Åke Larsén (as commander of Närförsvarsskolan (NärfS))
- 1959–1966: Sven-Åke Larsén
- 1966–1968: Torbjörn Ottosson
- 1968–1970: Per Erik Bergstrand
- 1970–1971: B Ingvar Johansson
- 1971–1974: Stefan Furenius
- 1974–1976: Torsten Engberg
- 1976–1978: Kaj Nielsen
- 1978–1980: Bengt Molin
- 1980–1983: Bo Strömgren
- 1983–1985: Anders Hammarskjöld
- 1985–1988: Claes-Göran Hedén
- 1988–1990: Peter Wilpart

== See also ==
- Sweden – Parachute Rangers
- Sweden – Special Protection Group
- Sweden – Special Operations Task Group
- Sweden – Special Reconnaissance Group
- Finland – Finnish Coastal Jaegers
- United States – United States Navy SEALs
- United States – Force Reconnaissance
- United Kingdom – Special Boat Service
- Norway – Kystjegerkommandoen
