= Swedish Amphibious Corps =

Land force arm of the Swedish Navy

Amphibious Corps
- Amfibiekåren
- Founded: 1 July 2000; 26 years ago
- Country: Sweden
- Branch: Swedish Navy
- Motto: Semper Opus Solve ("Always solving the task")
- March: "För kustartilleriet" (Åke Dohlin)
- Engagements: War in Afghanistan; EUFOR Tchad/RCA; EUNAVFOR

Insignia
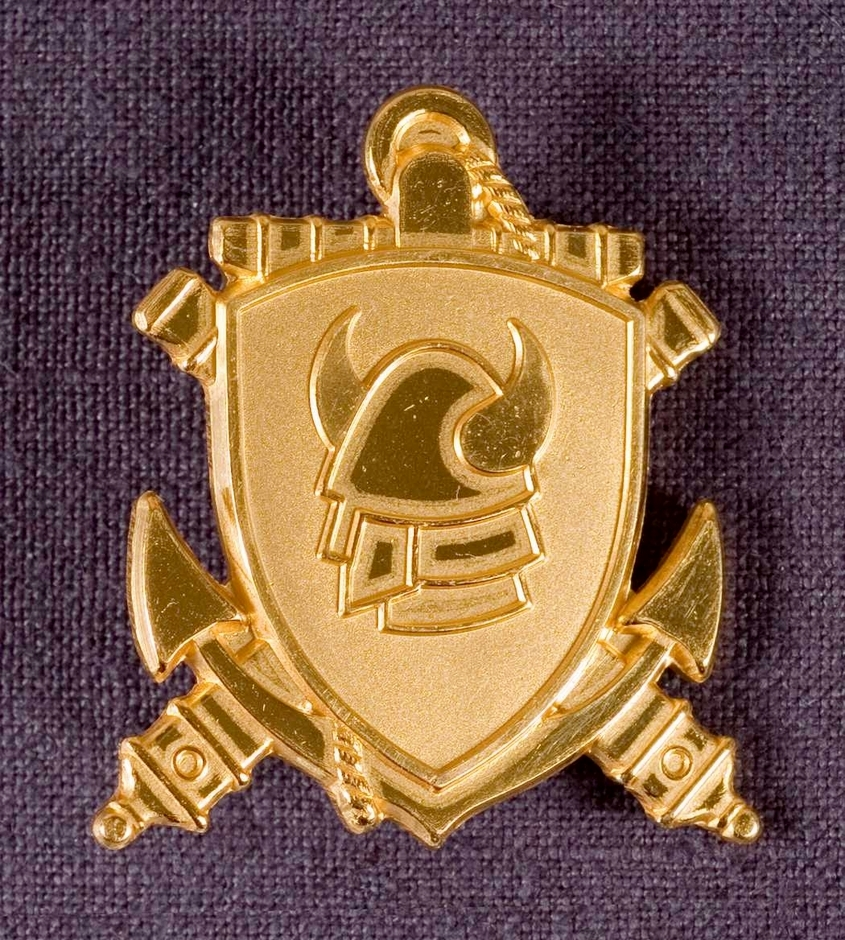
- Cap badge

The Amphibious Corps (Swedish: Amfibiekåren, Amf) is the marine infantry arm of the Swedish Navy, with an emphasis on coastal defence. It has its roots in the coastal artillery (Swedish: Kustartilleriet, KA) but after the end of the Cold War it was seen as too expensive and not needed anymore, and most of it was disbanded with only KA 1 and 4 being reorganised into Amf 1 and 4. Its amphibious special operations arm, Kustjägarna, has grown in significance while its coastal batteries have been decommissioned.

== History ==
The Swedish Amphibious Corps has its origins in the Swedish Coastal Artillery (KA), which was established in 1901. Ahead of the Defence Act of 2000, the Swedish government proposed that the future basic organization should include two coastal artillery units, with one of them serving as the principal unit. The government considered the Vaxholm Coastal Artillery Regiment and 1st Coastal Artillery Brigade (KA 1) to be that principal unit, due to its excellent proximity to the Stockholm Archipelago and access to training and firing ranges featuring representative terrain types. None of the other regiments were considered to have the terrain conditions or infrastructure required to serve as a principal unit.

The question of which regiment would remain alongside KA 1 stood between the Karlskrona Coastal Artillery Regiment and 2nd Coastal Artillery Brigade (KA 2), the Gotland Coastal Artillery Regiment (KA 3), and the Älvsborg Coastal Artillery Regiment (KA 4). KA 3 was quickly eliminated from consideration, as its operations were deemed limited and it lacked sufficient and suitable training areas. KA 4 was also considered to have limited training conditions. KA 2 was regarded as having the best conditions to operate as a second unit alongside KA 1. However, the government emphasized the importance of maintaining a military presence in Gothenburg, Sweden's second-largest city. Furthermore, it considered that retaining KA 4 would allow the Swedish Navy to continue operating its naval combat units in Gothenburg. Therefore, the government proposed that KA 1 and KA 4 be retained in the new basic organization.

Through the Defence Act of 2000, it was also decided that the Coastal Artillery would be disbanded in its existing form. The remaining units would be given a new focus. The government therefore decided that the units should be designated amphibious regiments and that the branch “Coastal Artillery” would be renamed the Amphibious Corps. As a result, the Vaxholm Coastal Artillery Regiment and 1st Coastal Artillery Brigade (KA 1) were disbanded as a coastal artillery unit on 30 June 2000. On 1 July 2000, it was replaced by the amphibious unit 1st Marine Regiment (Amf 1).

The Gotland Coastal Artillery Regiment, together with the Karlskrona Coastal Artillery Regiment, was disbanded on 31 October 2000, four months after the other units affected by the Defence Act. The delayed disbandment was due to their completion of the final round of basic training. From 1 November 2000, operations at these two regiments were transferred to a decommissioning organization, which remained in place until the process was to be completed no later than 31 December 2001. These decommissioning organizations were themselves dissolved on 30 June 2001, when the disbandment was considered complete. The remaining units, however, had already changed their names on 1 July 2000, when the Swedish Armed Forces' new organizational structure came into effect. At two simultaneous ceremonies held at Vaxholm Fortress and New Älvsborg Fortress on 26 October 2000, the Coastal Artillery officially changed its name to the Amphibious Corps.

On 1 July 2000, the reorganization of the Coastal Artillery into the Amphibious Corps began. This included the 1st Marine Regiment (Amf 1), the 4th Marine Regiment (Amf 4), and the Amphibious Warfare School (Amfibiestridsskolan, AmfSS). Between 2005 and 2021, only one unit remained: the 1st Marine Regiment (Amf 1), which during that period was simply called the Marine Regiment (Amf 1), but from 1 January 2022 has been designated the Stockholm Marine Regiment (Amf 1).

In 2020, the Swedish Parliament decided, through the Defence Act of 2020, that the Amphibious Corps should be expanded, and in autumn 2021 the 4th Marine Regiment (Amf 4) was re-established.

== Organization ==
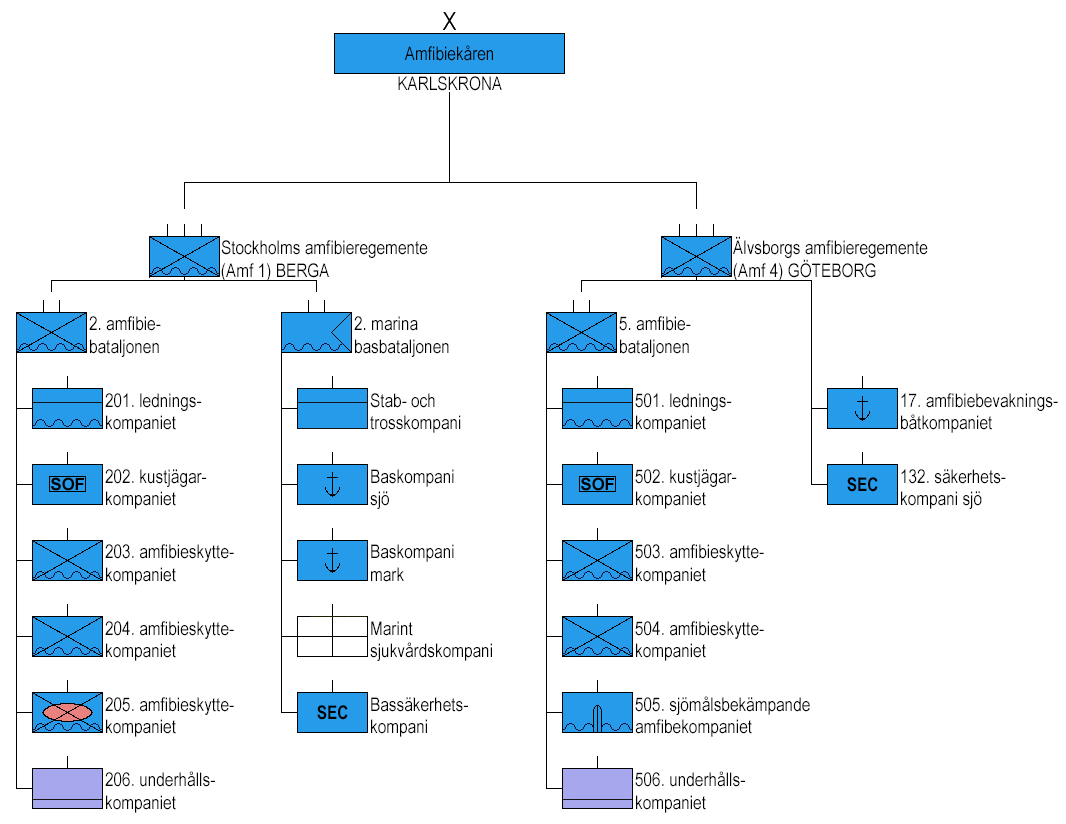
Swedish Navy - Swedish Amphibious Corps - Organization 2026-30

The 1st Marine Regiment (Amf 1) is the main combat unit of the Amphibious Corps. With its anti-ship missiles, controllable mines and coastal rangers, as well as marine infantry units, it can exercise control in littoral areas. The Regiment is primarily based at Berga Naval Base near Stockholm. Also based in Gothenburg, is the Marine component of the 13th Security Battalion. In addition, the 1st Marine Regiment is also responsible for training three Home Guard battalions, one of whom is based on Gotland. These are the:

1st Marine Regiment (Amf 1)

- 2nd Amphibious Battalion
  - 201st Headquarters Company
  - 202nd Coastal Ranger Company
  - 203rd Amphibious Rifle Company
  - 204th Amphibious Rifle Company
  - 205th Amphibious Rifle Company
  - 206th Support Company
- 2nd Naval Supply Battalion
  - Headquarters Company
  - Base Supply Company (Naval)
    - HSwMS Trossö (A264)
  - Base Supply Company (Land)
  - Medical Company
  - Naval Security Company

4th Marine Regiment (Amf 4)

- 5th Amphibious Battalion
  - Headquarters Company
  - Combat Company
  - Coastal Ranger Company
  - Amphibious Rifle Company
  - Support Company
- 17th Amphibious Patrol Boat Company
  - Staff Squad
    - HSwMS Skaftö (M13)
  - Close Protection Squad
  - Patrol Boat Platoon
  - Sensor Platoon
  - Boarding Squad
  - Support Squad
- 132nd Naval Security Company

== Force Design ==
Sweden has a long tradition of amphibious warfare units based on small vessels with the ability to navigate the shallow waters of Northern Europe. Today's main amphibious warfare units, the amphibious battalions, was a development of the Coastal Rangers Companies established after WWII. The main weapon systems of the Swedish amphibious battalions are controlled mines, mortars and anti-ship missiles (Rbt-17) with mobility mainly provided by a large number of CB90-class fast assault craft.

The next generation of Swedish amphibious forces are developed in the Force Design Swedish Marine Battalion 2030 program with the objective to evolve the Swedish amphibious forces to improve their ability to meet present and future threats and the demands of the ongoing NATO-integration. The program will during the coming years introduce a number of new platforms with sea-mobile data-centric weapon and sensor systems including sea-borne mortar, radar, anti-ship and air defence systems.

== Ranks and insignia ==
Since 2019 the ranks and insignia of the Swedish Amphibious Corps are as follows:

Officers

NATO code	OF-10	OF-9	OF-8	OF-7	OF-6	OF-5	OF-4	OF-3	OF-2	OF-1
(Sweden) Swedish Amphibious Corps
(Sweden) Swedish Amphibious Corps		General	Generallöjtnant	Generalmajor	Brigadgeneral	Överste	Överstelöjtnant	Major	Kapten	Löjtnant	Fänrik

Other ranks

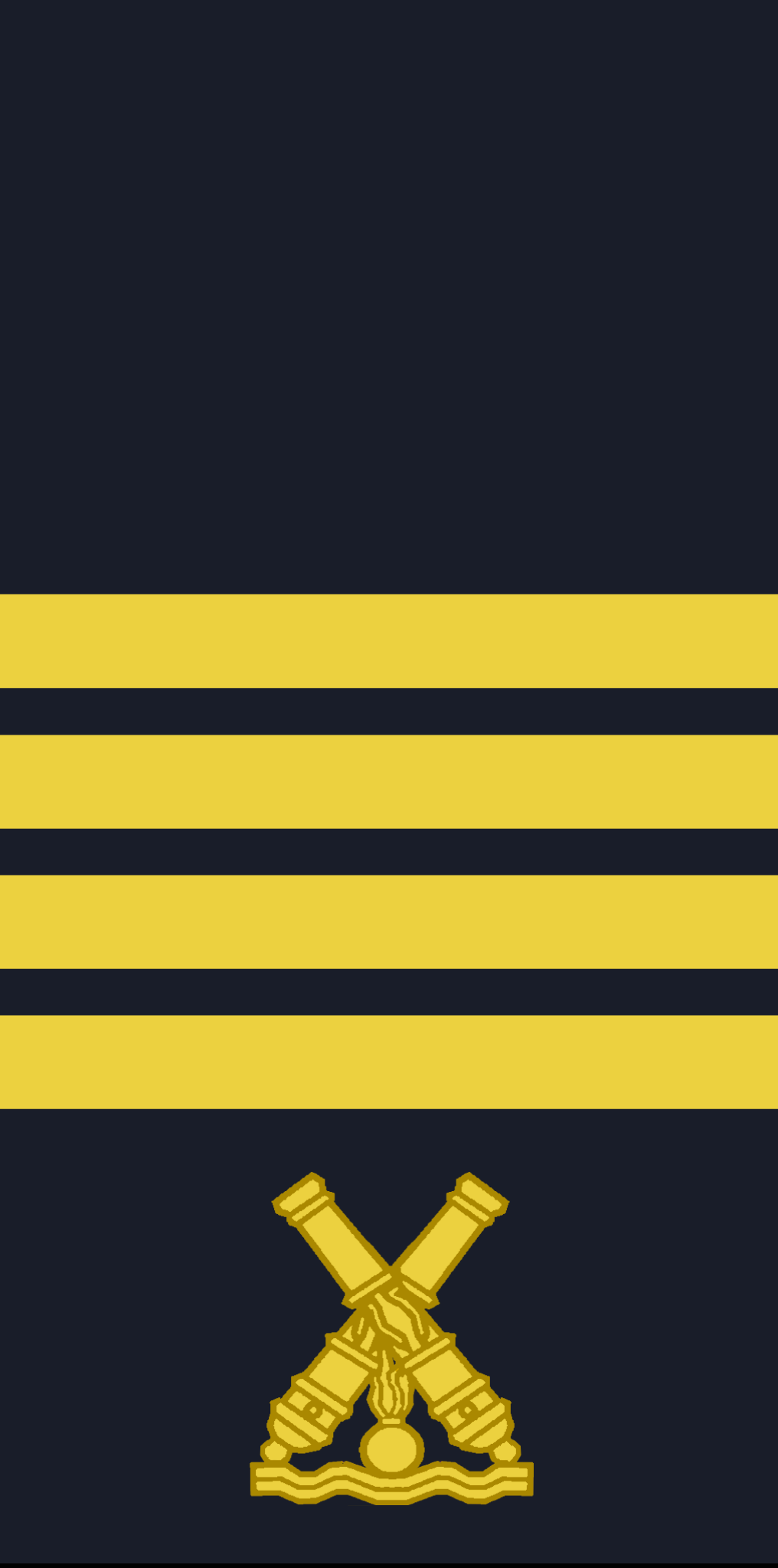
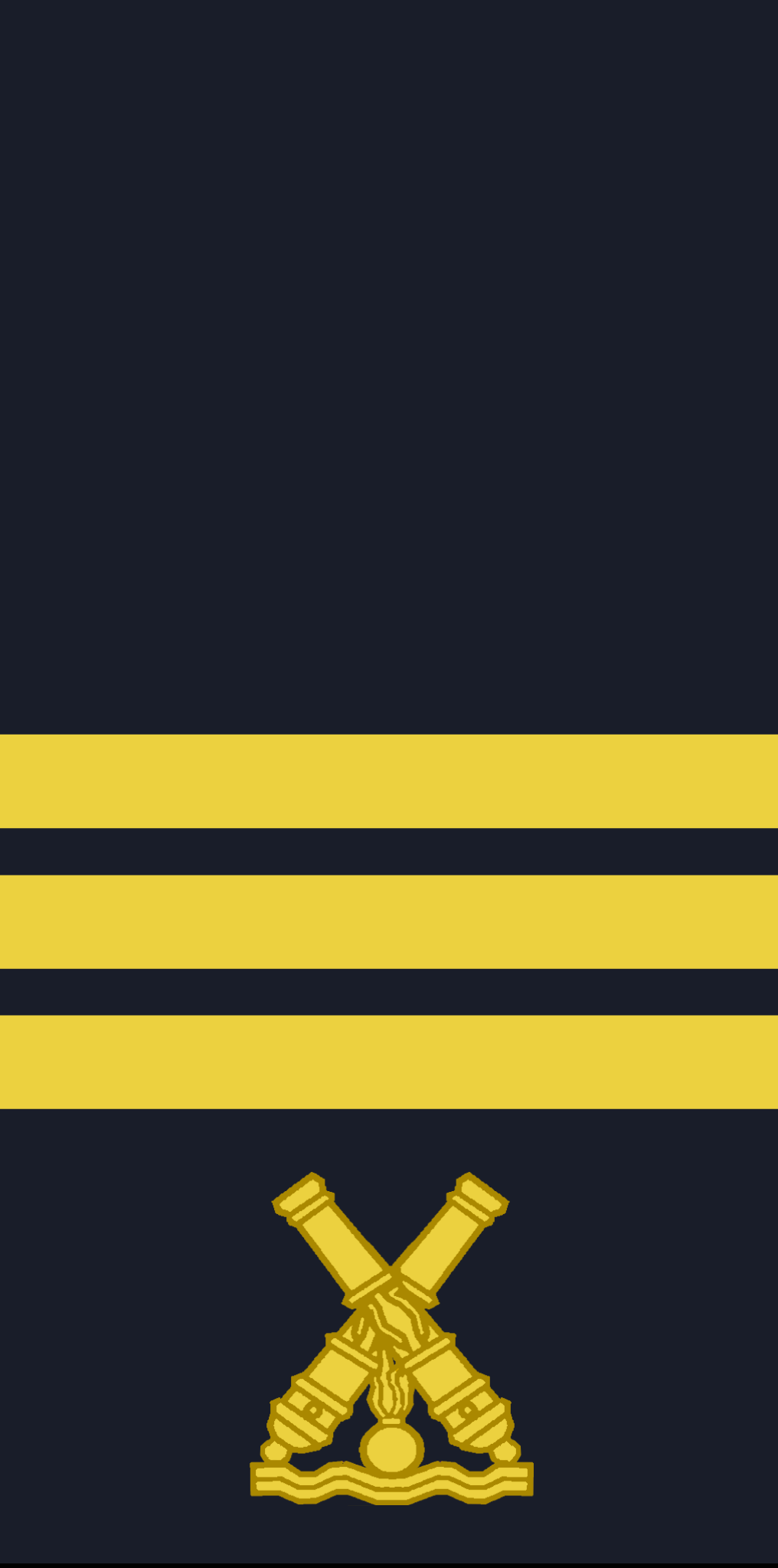
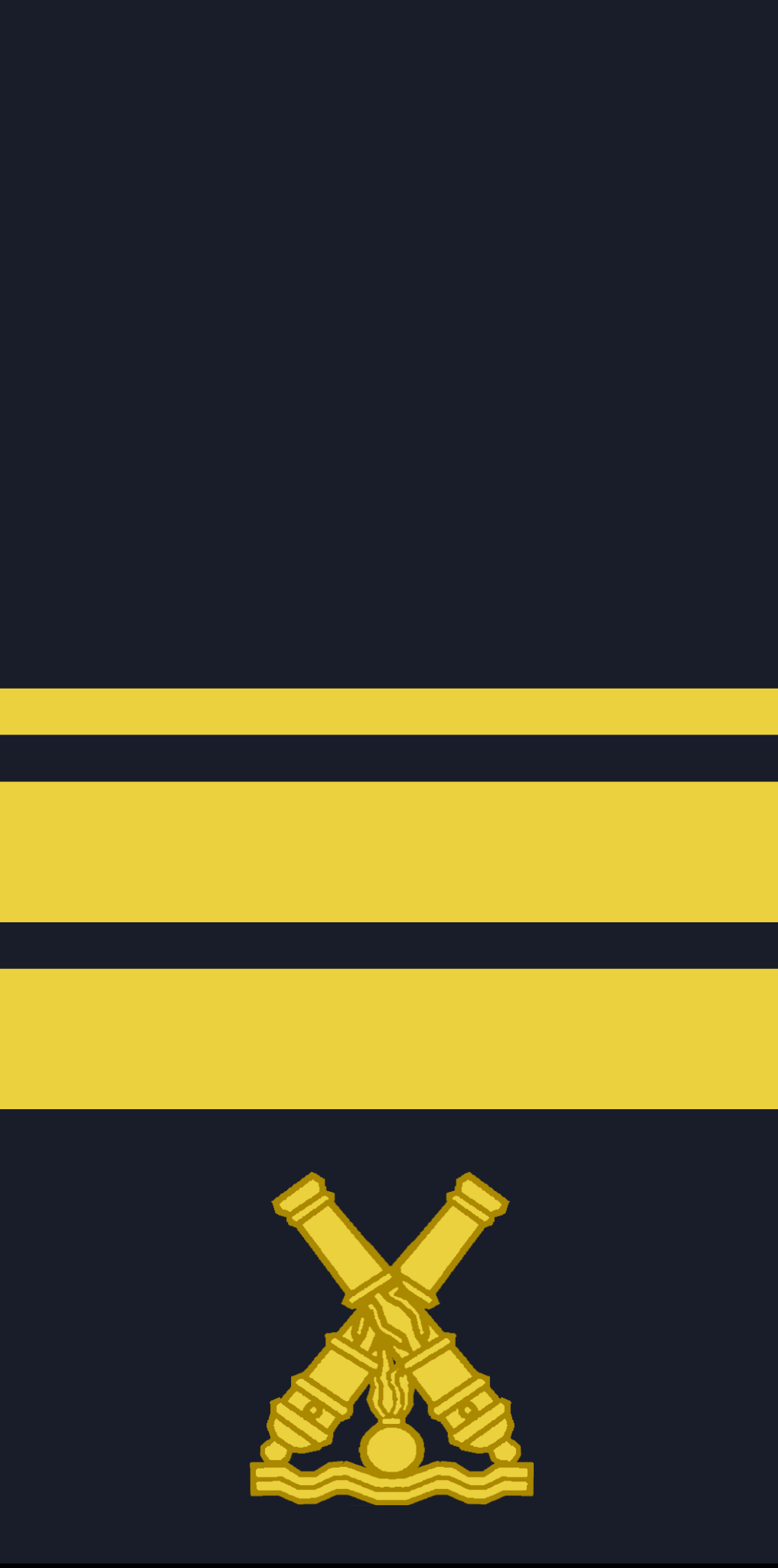
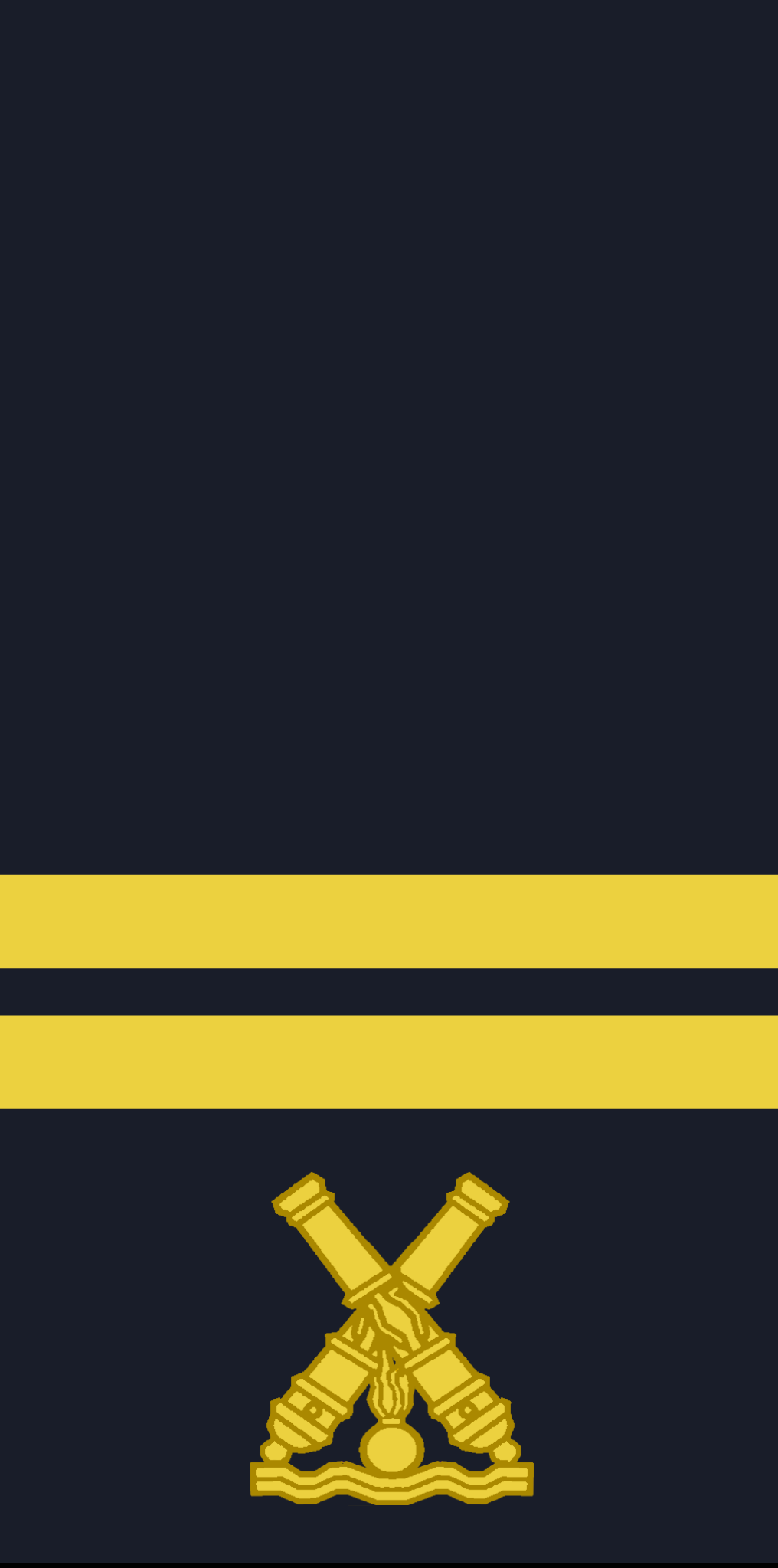
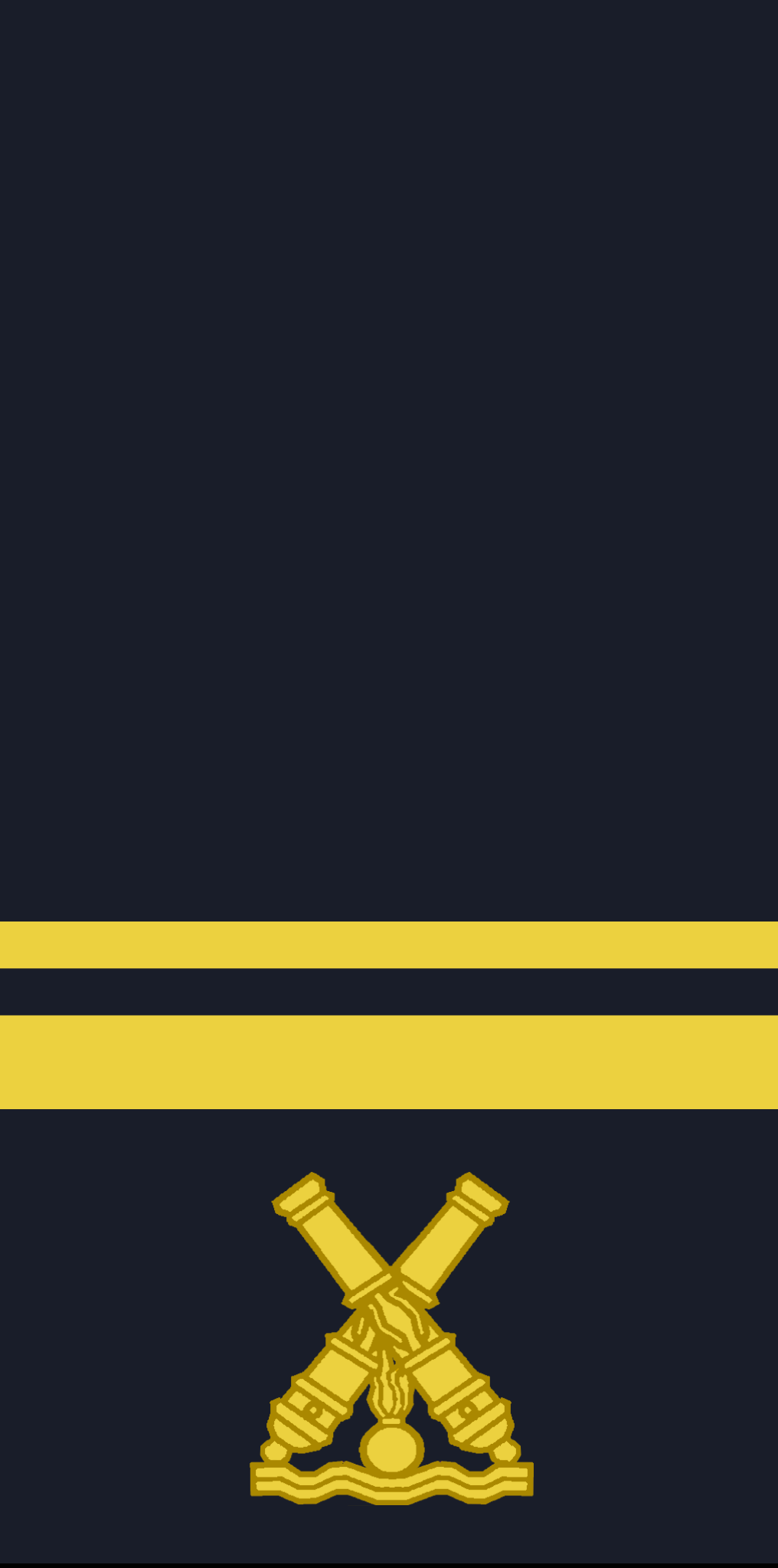
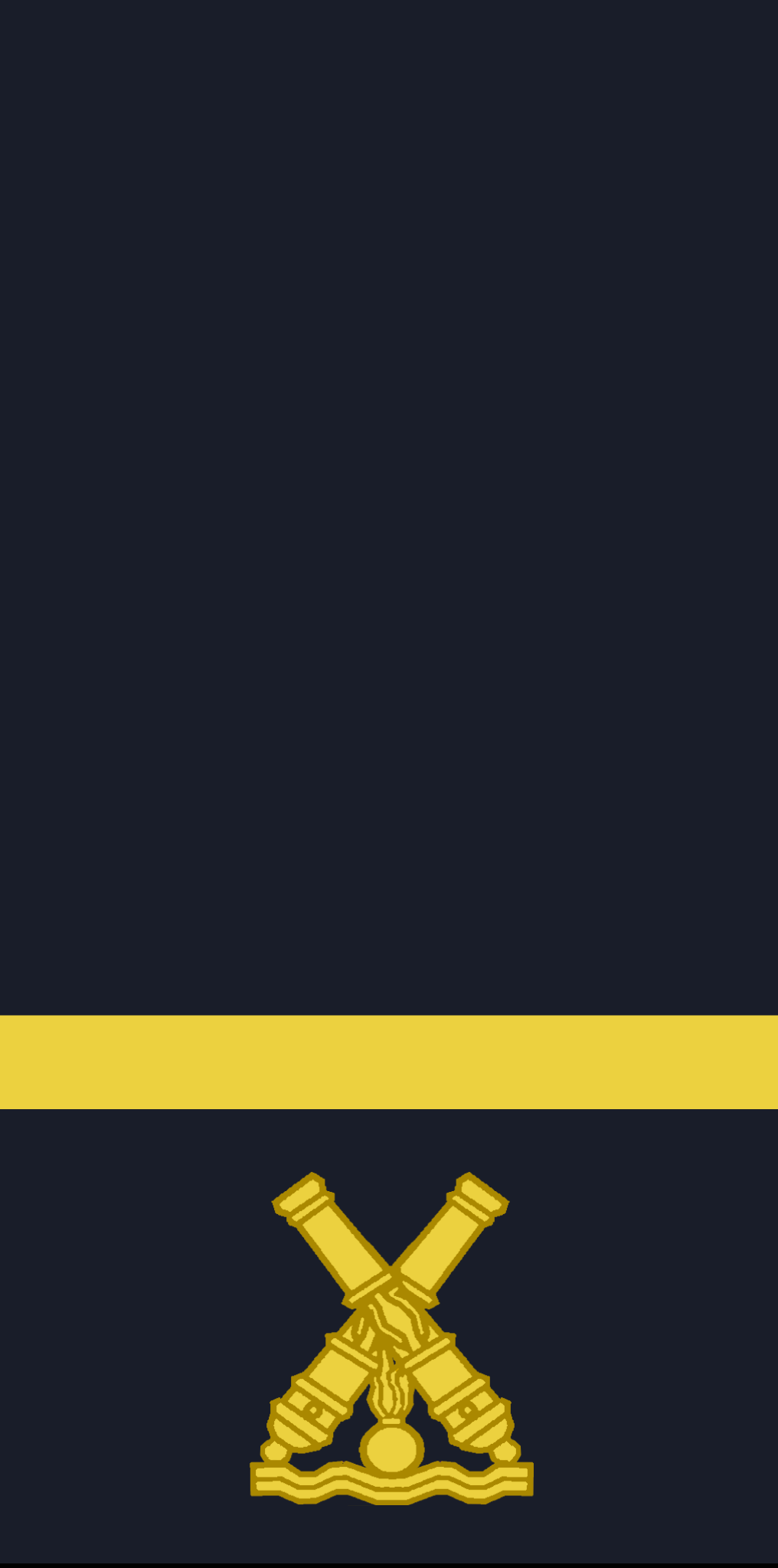
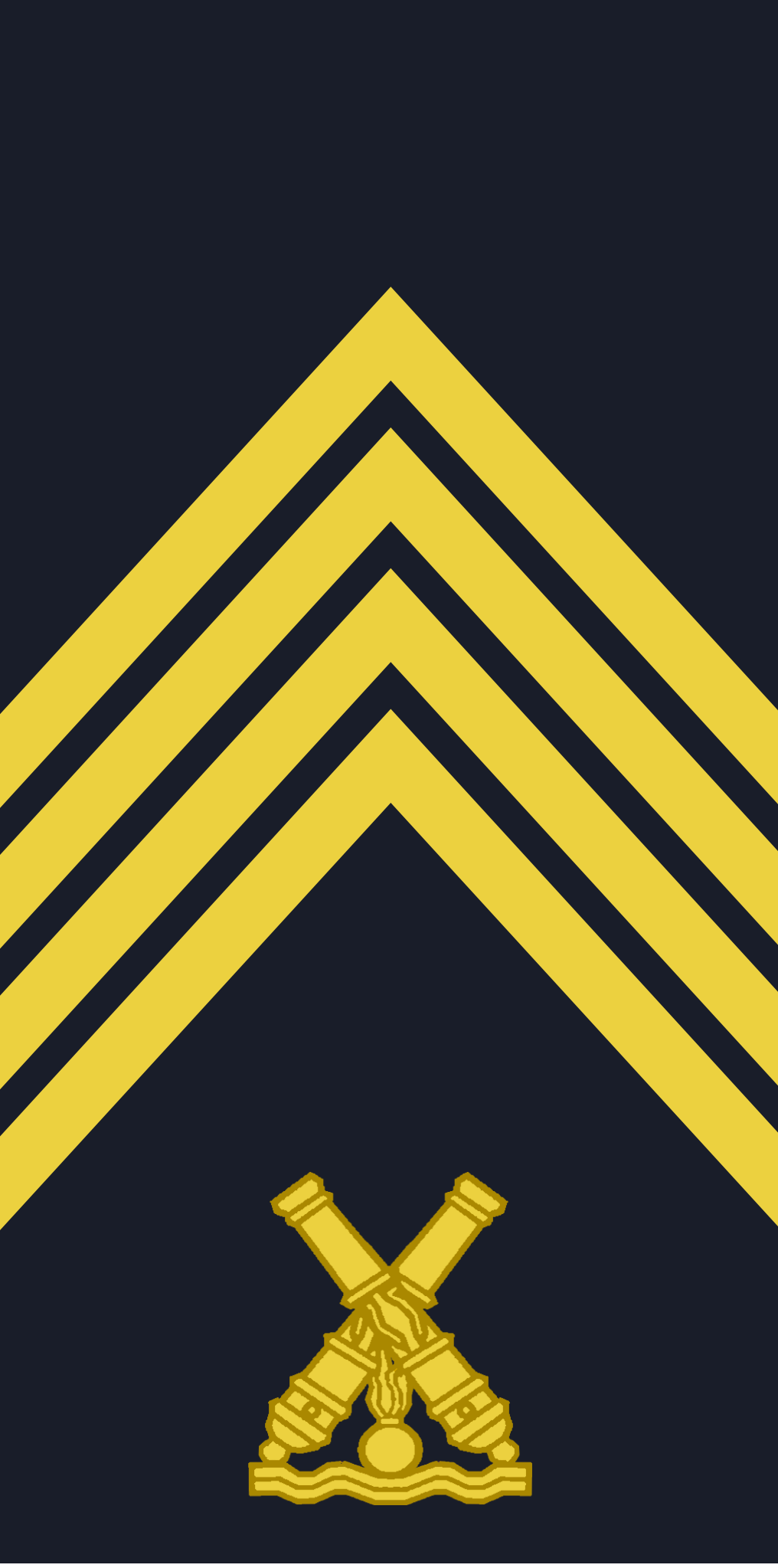
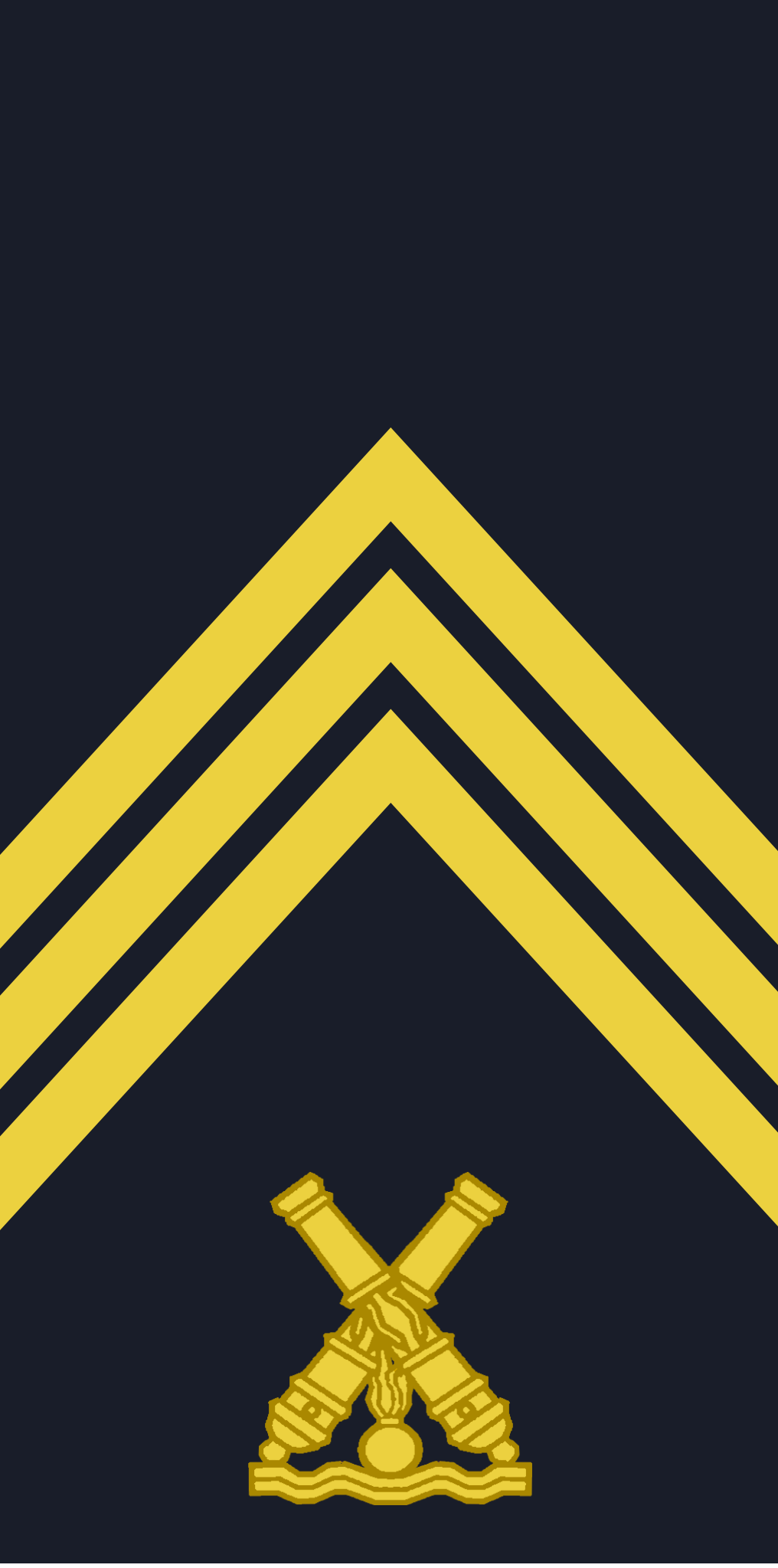
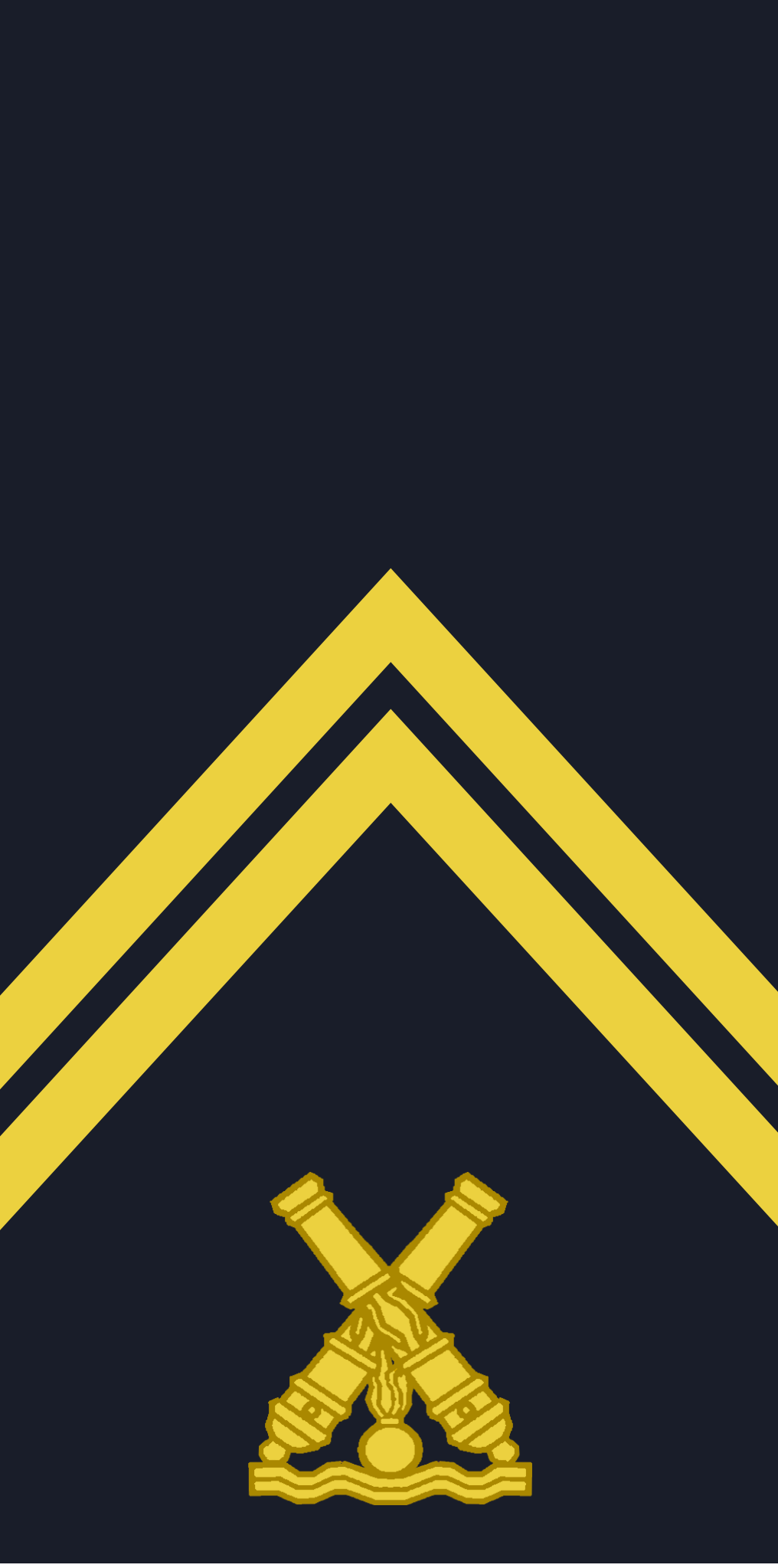
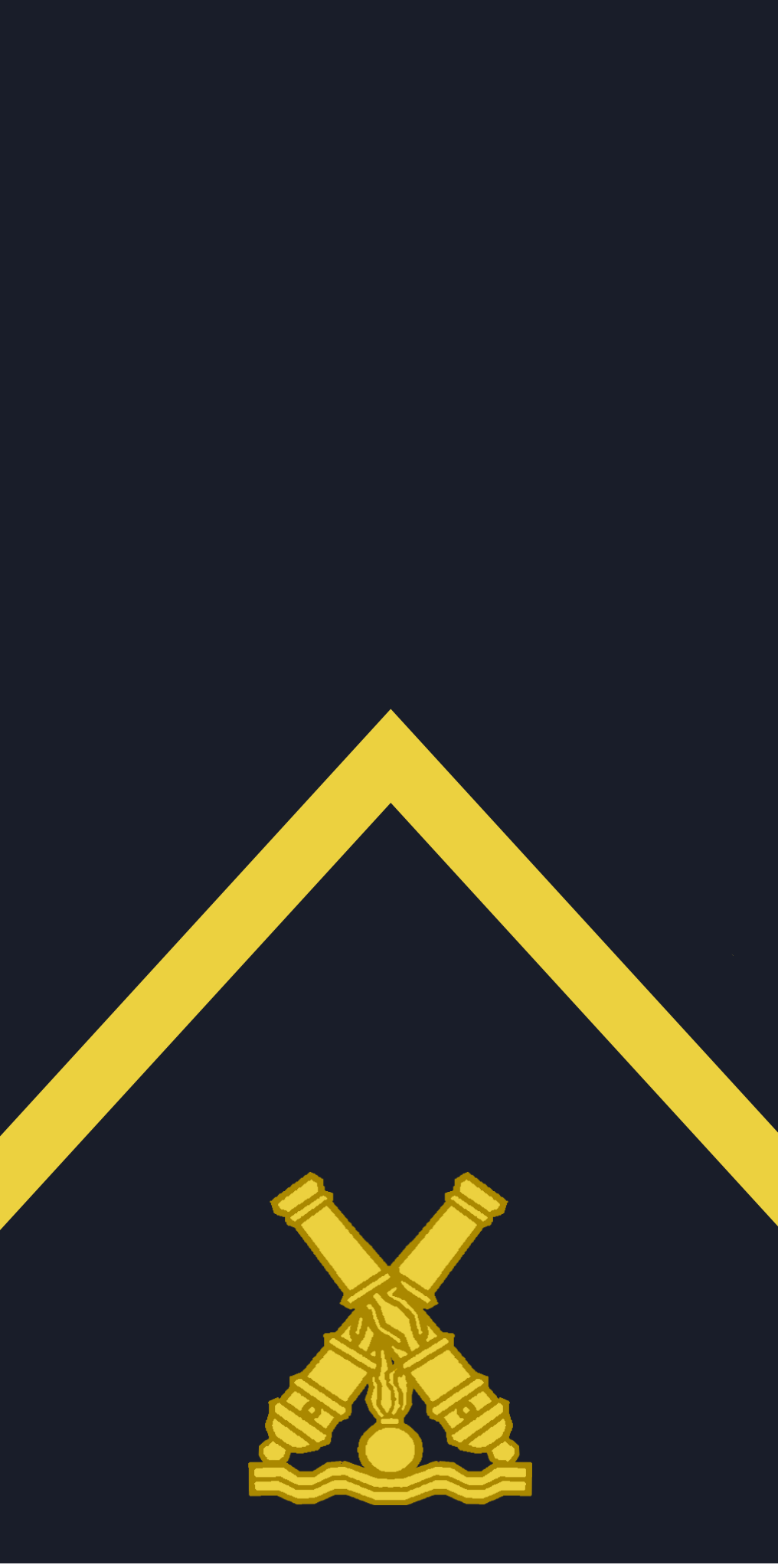
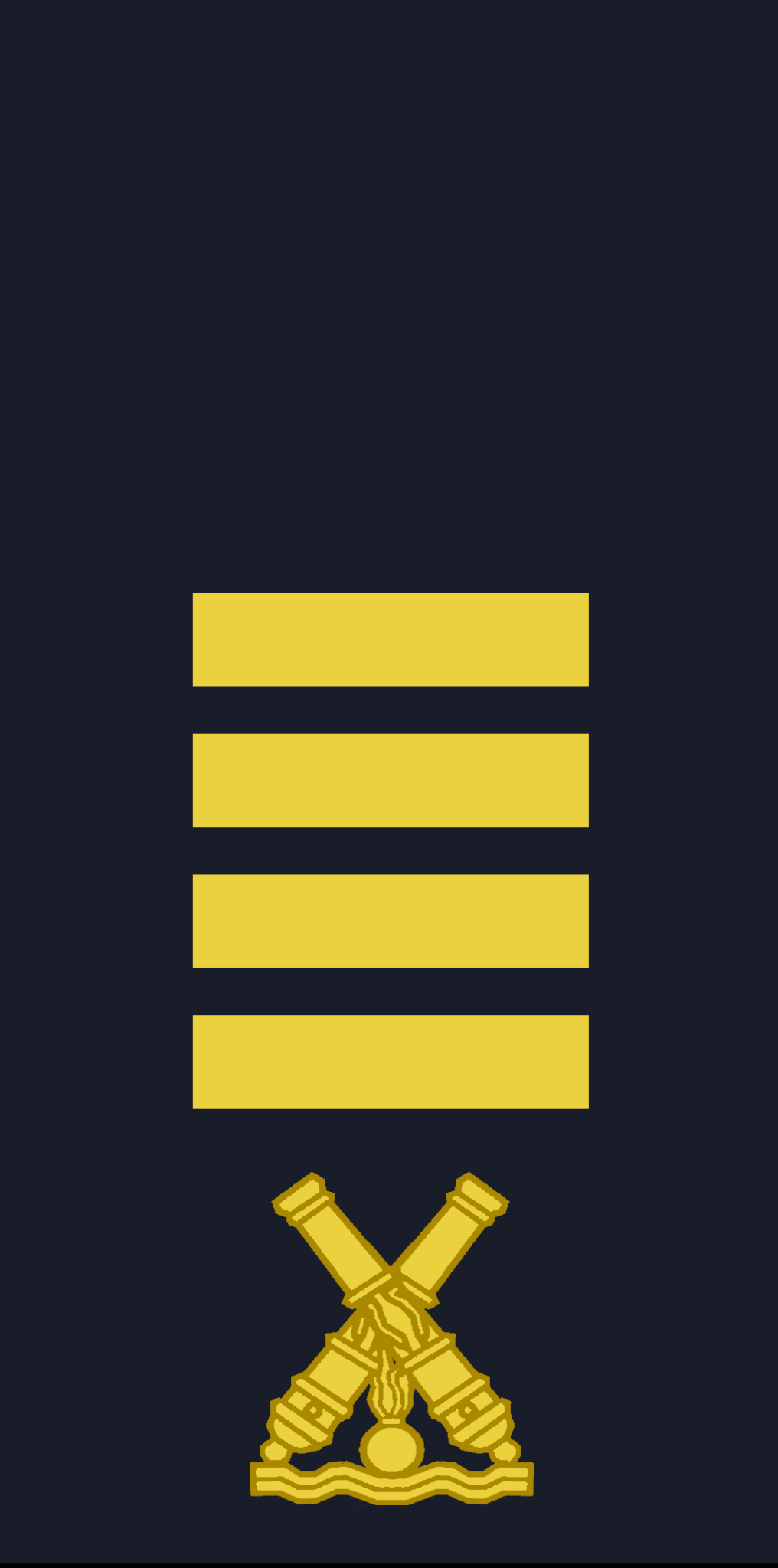
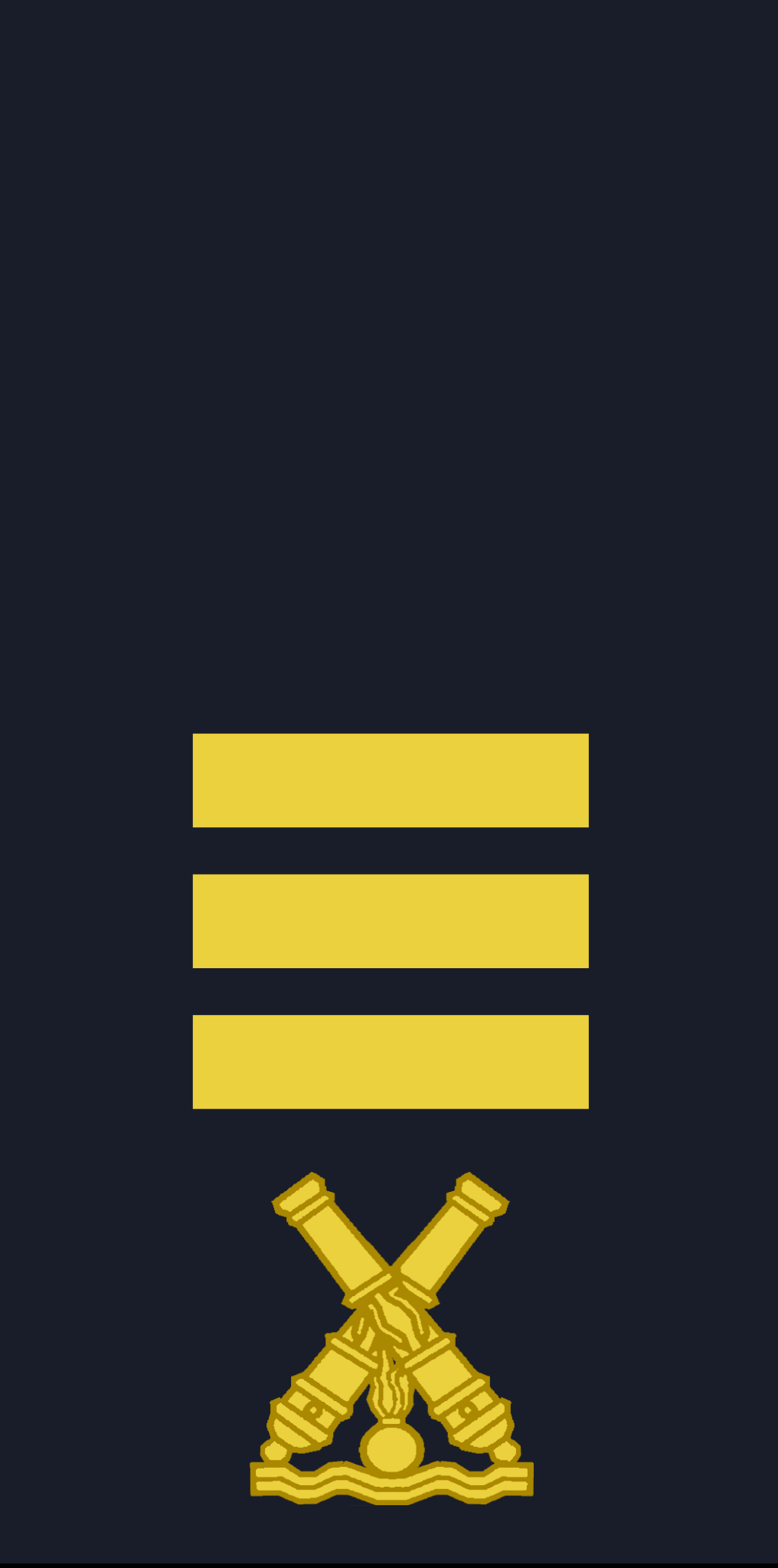
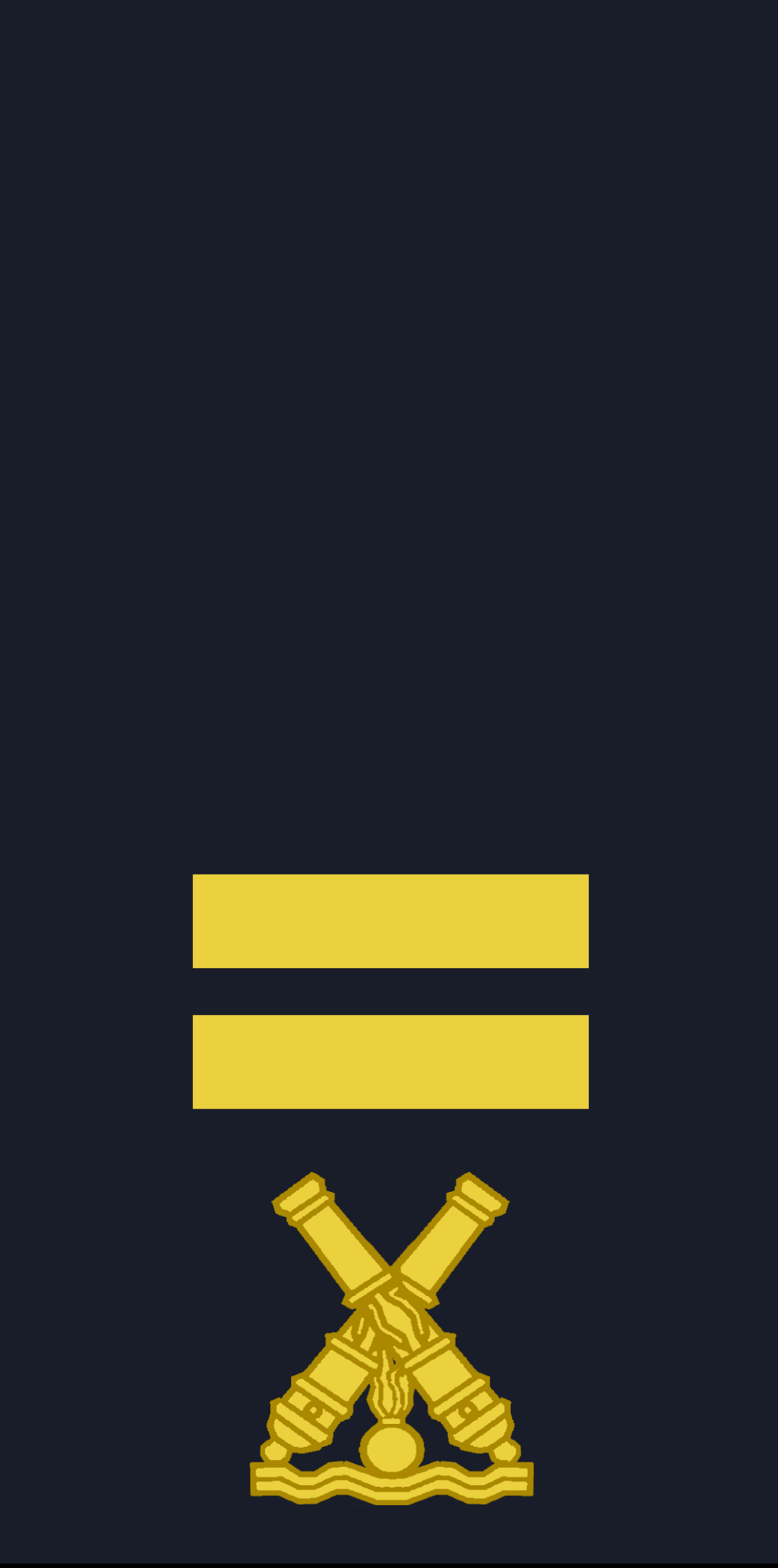
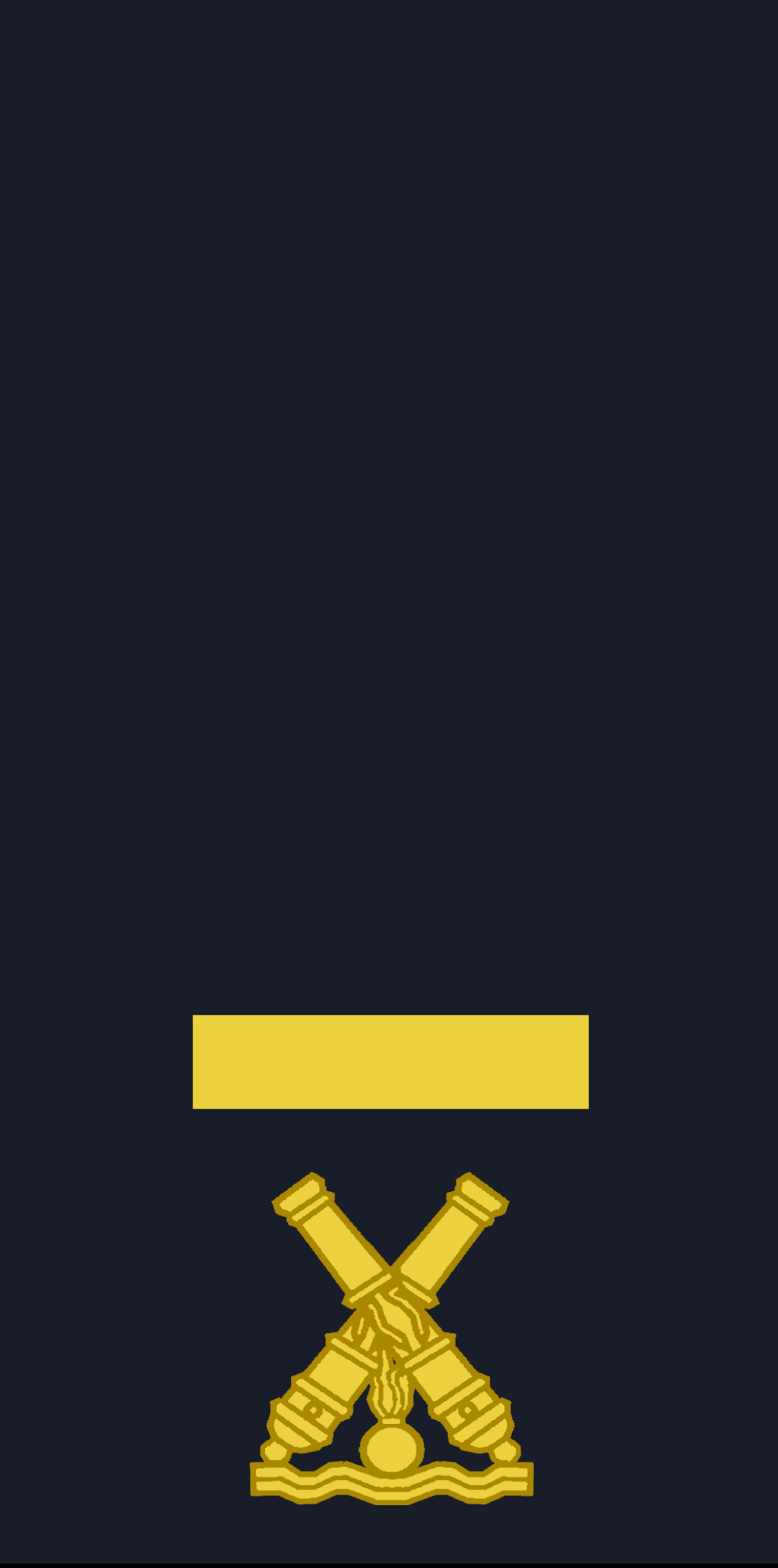
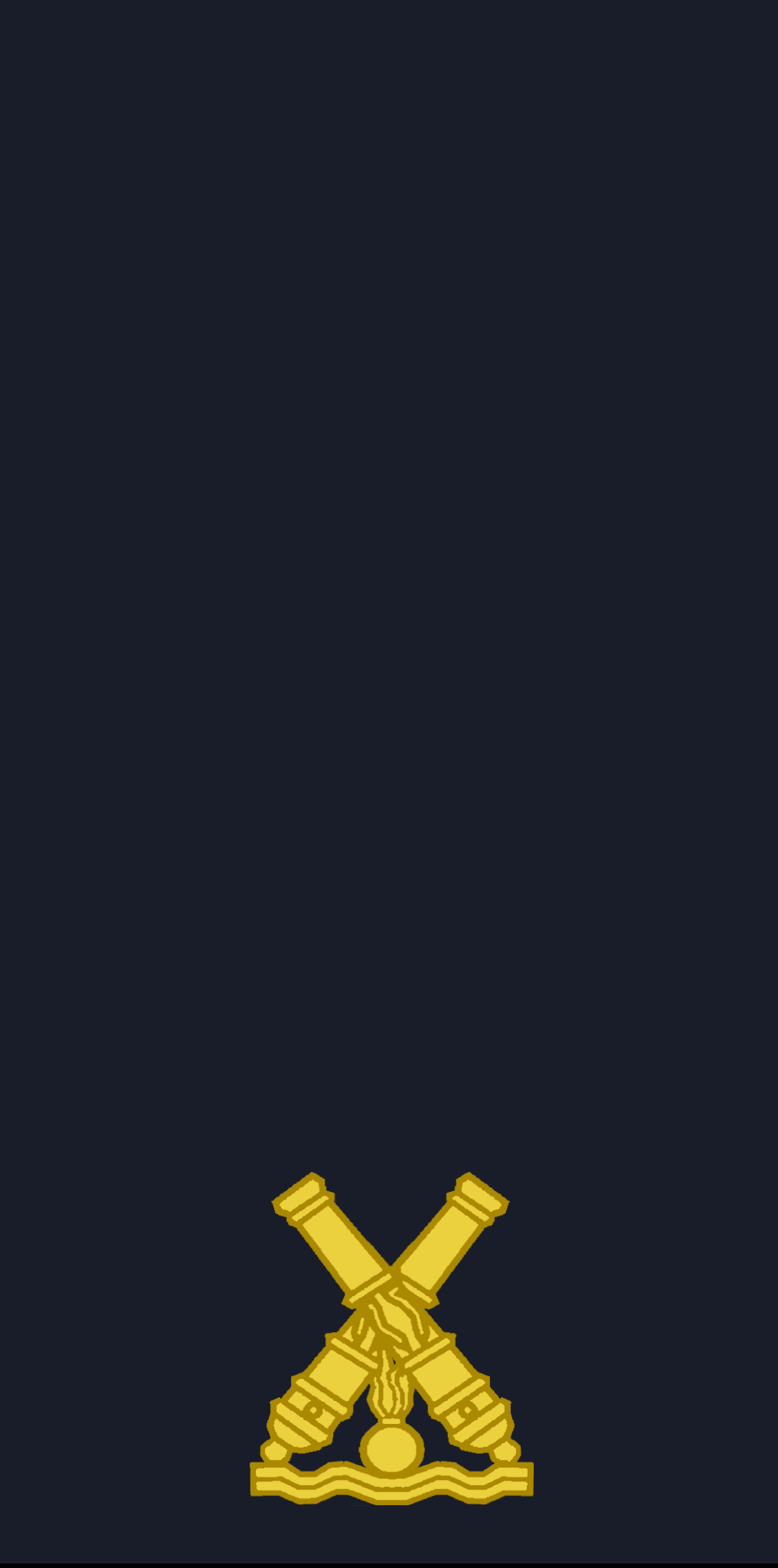
NATO code	OR-9	OR-8	OR-7		OR-6		OR-5		OR-4	OR-3	OR-2				OR-1
(Sweden) Swedish Amphibious Corps
(Sweden) Swedish Amphibious Corps	Regementsförvaltare	Förvaltare	Överfanjunkare	Fanjunkare	Översergeant	Sergeant	Överfurir	Furir	Korpral	Vicekorpral	Menig 4	Menig 3	Menig 2	Menig 1	Menig

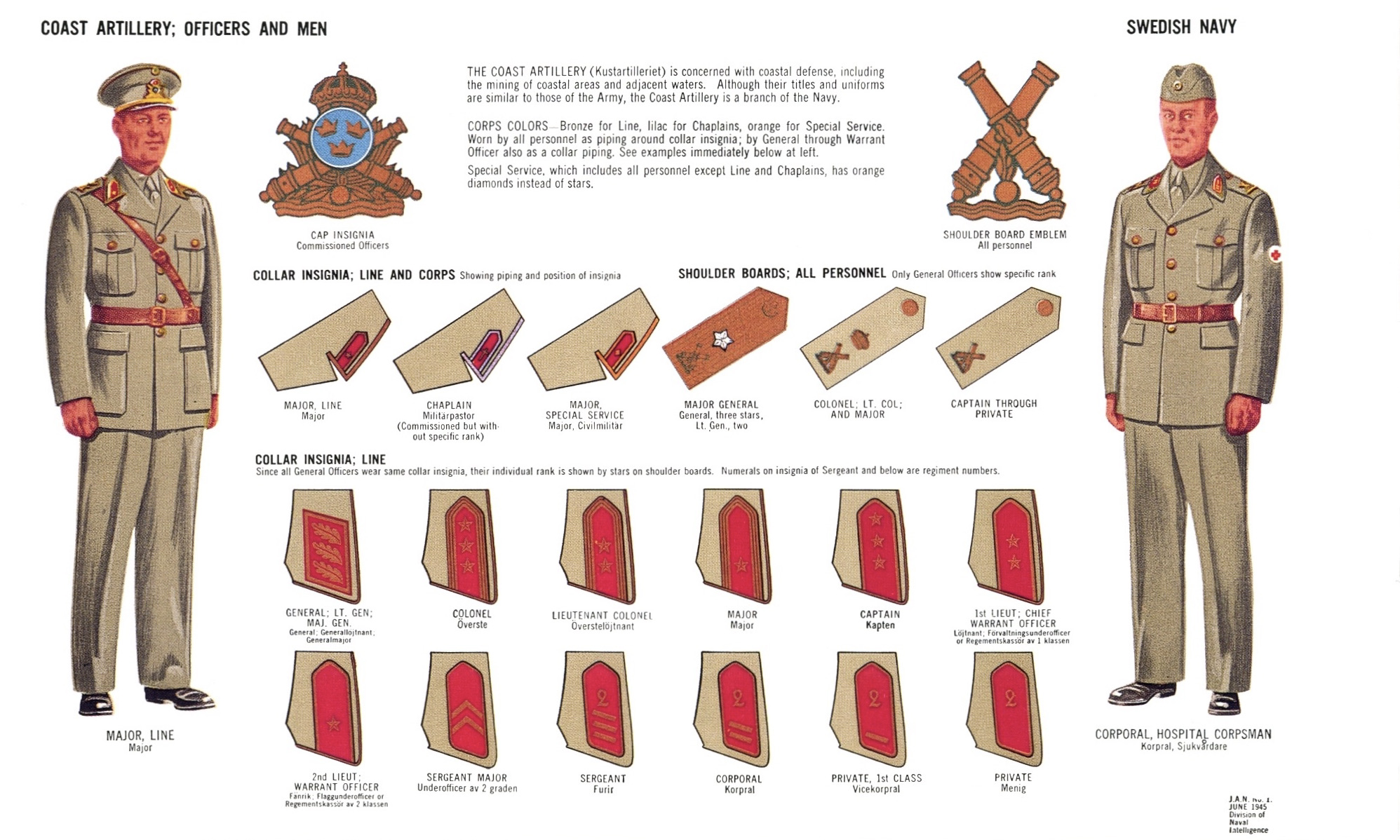
Historical rank insignia of the Swedish Coastal Artillery (the predecessor of the Amphibious Corps), field grey uniform model 1942 with red collar patches.

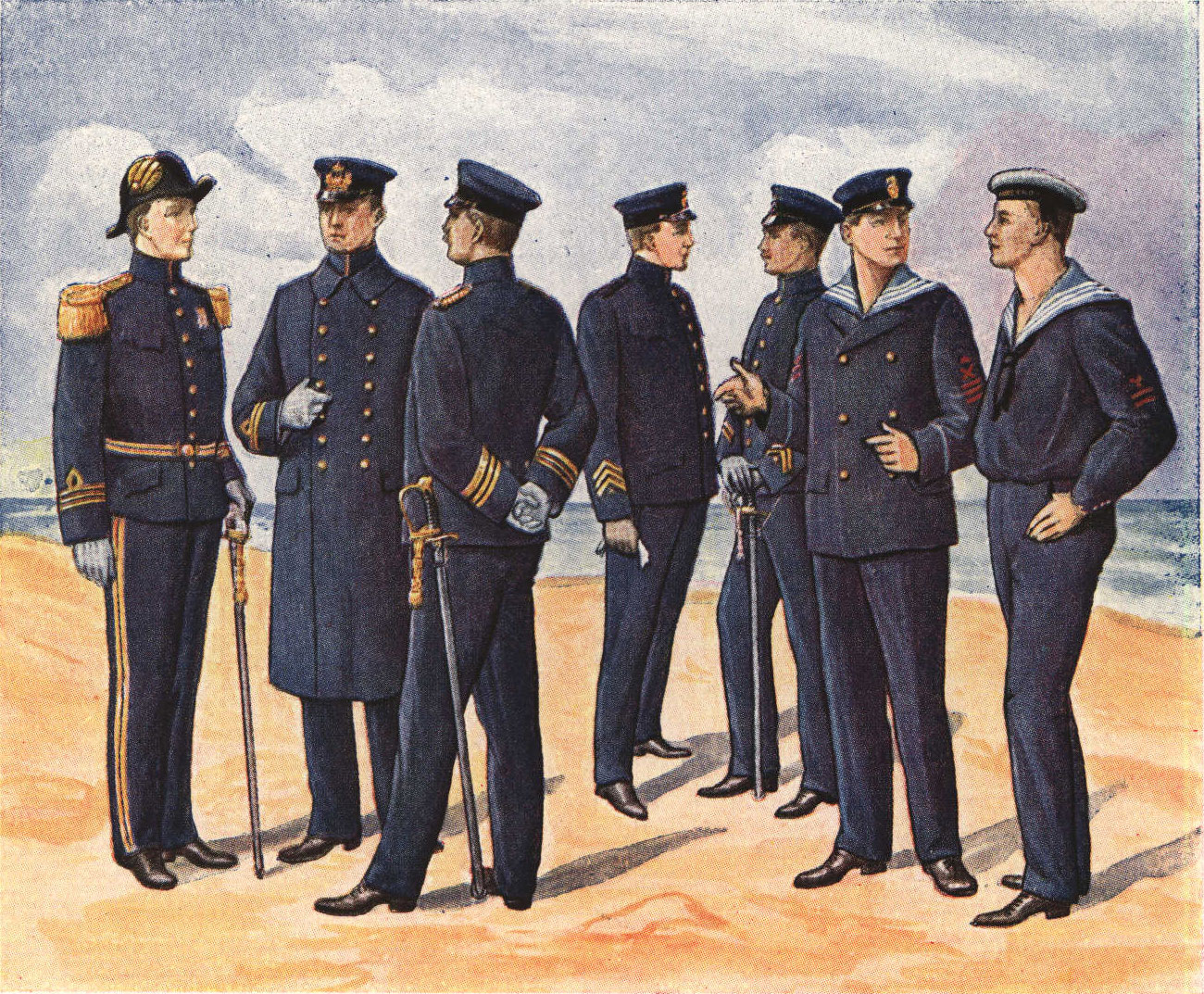
Historical rank insignia of the Swedish Coastal Artillery (the predecessor of the Amphibious Corps), blue uniform model 1902 with naval type rank insigna.

== Heraldry and traditions ==
The coat of arms of the Swedish Amphibious Corps since 2000. It was previously used by the Swedish Coastal Artillery 1979–2000 and the Coastal Artillery Center (Kustartillericentrum, KAC) 1995–1997. Blazon: "Gules, two gunbarrels of older pattern in saltire above a flaming grenade and waves, all or".

== See also ==
- Spain – Spanish Marine Infantry
- Finland – Nyland Brigade
- Italy – San Marco Marine Brigade
- Netherlands – Netherlands Marine Corps
- Portugal – Portuguese Marine Corps
- United Kingdom – Royal Marines
- United States - United States Marine Corps
