= Bertil Stjernfelt =

Swedish military personnel (1917–2017)

- Born: Henning Bertil Stjernfelt; 24 July 1917; Gothenburg, Sweden
- Died: 21 January 2017 (aged 99); Stockholm, Sweden
- Military career
- Allegiance: Sweden
- Branch: Swedish Navy
- Service years: 1940–1977
- Rank: Lieutenant Colonel
- Commands: Kustartilleriets befälsskola; Chief of Staff, GK/KA 3; Intelligence Dept., Naval Staff; Military History Dept., MHS
- Conflicts: Cyprus dispute

Lieutenant Colonel Henning Bertil Stjernfelt (24 July 1917 – 21 January 2017) was a Swedish Army officer and military historian. Stjernfelt graduated from the Royal Swedish Naval Academy in 1940 and immediately entered service with the Vaxholm Coastal Artillery Regiment during the German invasion of Denmark and Norway. As a young lieutenant in World War II, he commanded an artillery battery in the northern Sea of Åland, maintaining full combat readiness throughout the war. His early passion for military history led to his first book Alarm in the Atlantic Wall, which earned praise from Charles de Gaulle.

After the war, he pursued advanced military education in Sweden and the United Kingdom, later teaching at the Royal Swedish Naval Academy and Staff College. Stjernfelt became a strong advocate for amphibious units in Swedish defence, playing a decisive role in the establishment of the Coastal Rangers in 1956. He held several key command and staff positions, including head of the Coastal Artillery Warrant Officers' School, chief of staff in Gotland Coastal Artillery Defence, and later head of the Naval Staff's Intelligence Department.

Internationally, he commanded the Swedish UN contingent in Cyprus (1966–1967) and attended senior intelligence training in the United States. He concluded his career as head of the military history department at the Swedish Armed Forces Staff College, where he served until his retirement in 1977. In retirement, he pursued academic studies, conducted research, and remained an active writer and lecturer on military history, publishing works in multiple languages and contributing regularly to professional journals.

== Early life ==
Stjernfelt was born on 24 July 1917 in Gustavi Parish, Gothenburg and Bohus County, Sweden, the son of Henning Stjernfelt, a dentist, and his wife Ruth (née Magnusson). He passed studentexamen at Norra Latin in Stockholm in 1937.

== Career ==
=== Military career ===
Stjernfelt graduated from the Royal Swedish Naval Academy in 1940 and was commissioned as an officer and assigned to Vaxholm Coastal Artillery Regiment on 9 April, earlier then planned due to the German attack on Denmark and Norway. On the same day, he had to mobilize a preparedness unit in the inlet towards Stockholm. Already as a young lieutenant, he became battery commander of an artillery battery on the island of Roten in the northern Sea of Åland, a battery that kept full combat readiness throughout the World War II. At an early age he developed a great interest in military history. Shortly after the end of World War II, he cycled with his new wife Borghild along the invasion coast of Normandy, gathering information both in the terrain and from the German commanders who led the defence there. This resulted in the book Alarm i Atlantvallen ("Alarm in the Atlantic Wall"). A French edition of this book prompted an appreciative letter from general Charles de Gaulle.

Stjernfelt attended the Royal Swedish Naval Staff College's Staff and Artillery Course from 1947 to 1949 and the Royal Marines Amphibious Warfare Course in England in 1951. Stjernfelt then served as a teacher at the Royal Swedish Naval Academy and the Royal Swedish Naval Staff College from 1951 to 1955. Stjernfelt became an avid debater for the coastal artillery defence to be supplemented with amphibious units, among other things through the book Swedish amphibious units - luxury or necessity. This resulted in 1956 in the establishment of the Coastal Rangers. Stjernfelt served as commander of the Coastal Artillery Warrant Officers' School (Kustartilleriets befälsskola) in Gothenburg from 1956 to 1958 and he was promoted to major in 1957 and was assigned as a regimental officer in the Coastal Artillery Staff (Kustartilleristaben) in Gothenburg from 1958 to 1962. He served as chief of staff in Gotland Coastal Artillery Defence with Gotland Coastal Artillery Corps from 1962 to 1964 and was promoted to lieutenant colonel and attended the Swedish National Defence College in 1963. Stjernfelt was then head of the Naval Staff's Intelligence Department from 1964 to 1970, during which time he was an expert in the Swedish Armed Forces' Total Defence Security Investigation (1965–1969) and served as commander and colonel of the Swedish UN contingent, part of the United Nations Peacekeeping Force in Cyprus (UNFICYP), in Cyprus (1966–1967). In 1968, Stjernfelt attended the Senior Foreign Officers Intelligence Course in United States and he was then head of the military history department at the Swedish Armed Forces Staff College and a member of the military history delegation from 1970 until his retirement in 1977.

=== Post-retirement ===
After retirement, Stjernfelt received a Bachelor of Arts degree in 1979 and from 1982 he conducted research at the UN Department and in the Royal Swedish Society of Naval Sciences and more. He was also a member of Täby culture board and municipal council from 1979 to 1982. Stjernfelt was a diligent writer on military historical events, including the publications Alarm i Atlantvallen and Vägen till Westerplatte, publications translated into German and French. He also appeared in several articles in Tidskrift i Sjöväsendet and in Royal Swedish Academy of War Sciences's Handlingar och Tidskrift.

== Personal life ==
In 1947, Stjernfelt married Borghild Maria Kihlstedt (1923–2003), the daughter of Major Hugo Kihlstedt and Vera (née Blomquist). He was the father of Marie-Christine, Hélène, and Cecilia.

== Death ==
Stjernfelt died on 21 January 2017 in Stockholm. He was interred on 24 July 2017 at Djursholm cemetery.

== Dates of rank ==
- 1940 – Second lieutenant
- 19?? – Lieutenant
- 19?? – Captain
- 1957 – Major
- 1963 – Lieutenant colonel

== Awards and decorations ==
- (Sweden) Coastal Ranger Association Medal of Merit (Förbundet Kustjägarnas förtjänstmedalj) in silver (2004)

== Honours ==
- Member of the Royal Swedish Society of Naval Sciences (1970)
- Member of the Royal Swedish Academy of War Sciences, Department II (1977)

== Bibliography ==
- Stjernfelt, Bertil (1949). Det tyska kustartilleriets omfattning och verksamhet vid invasionen i Normandie: hemarbete i KA-taktik och föredrag i artilleri vid KSHS stabs- resp. artillerikurs arbetsåren 1947-1949 (in Swedish). Stockholm. SELIBR 2833022.
- Stjernfelt, Bertil (1953). Alarm i Atlantvallen [Alarm in the Atlantic Wall]. Marinlitteraturföreningen, 0348-2405; 47 (in Swedish). Stockholm. SELIBR 1443106.
- Stjernfelt, Bertil (1953). Alarm i Atlantvallen [Alarm in the Atlantic Wall]. Militärlitteraturföreningen, 99-0119708-2; 205Marinlitteraturföreningen, 0348-2405; 47 (in Swedish). Stockholm: [fören.] SELIBR 1443803.
- Stjernfelt, Bertil (1953). Alarm i Atlantvallen [Alarm in the Atlantic Wall] (in Swedish) (2nd ed.). Stockholm: Hörsta. SELIBR 1466868.
- Stjernfelt, Bertil (1961). Alerte sur le Mur de l'Atlantique Le titre original de cet ouvrage est: Alarm i Atlantvallen (in French). Translated by Gauffin, Rolf. Paris: Presses de la Cité. SELIBR 0bgz8fpwxstcctrs.
- Wockatz, Lennart; Stjernfelt, Bertil (1955). Svenska amfibieförband: lyx eller nödvändighet?. Marinlitteraturföreningen, 0348-2405; 48Militärlitteraturföreningen, 99-0119708-2; 212 (in Swedish). Stockholm: Militärlitteraturföreningen. SELIBR 1186023.
- Stjernfelt, Bertil (1977). Sveriges militära FN-insatser: en historik? : motivation, förslag till riktlinjer, skiss till arbetsplan (in Swedish). Stockholm. SELIBR 21432009.
- Stjernfelt, Bertil; Böhme, Klaus-Richard; Calleman, Birger; Wojcikowski-Ericson, Marietta (1978). Vägen till Westerplatte. Militärhistoriska studier, 0348-5293; 2Marinlitteraturföreningen, 0348-2405; 65 (in Swedish). Stockholm: Militärhistoriska avd., Militärhögsk. SELIBR 199411.
- Stjernfelt, Bertil; Böhme, Klaus-Richard (1979). Westerplatte 1939. Einzelschriften zur militärischen Geschichte des Zweiten Weltkrieges, 99-0149304-8; 23 (in German). Freiburg: Rombach. ISBN 3-7930-0182-2. SELIBR 5980544.
- Stjernfelt, Bertil (1981). Åland 1918: säregen föregångare till nutida FN-operationer : årsberättelse 1981 (in Swedish). [S.l.]: [s.n.] SELIBR 2834175.
- Stjernfelt, Bertil (1987). Fredsskådeplats Sinai: FN:s fredsbevarande operation i Mellanöstern 1973-1980 - särskilt den svenska insatsen (in Swedish) (1st ed.). Stockholm: Allmänna förl. ISBN 9138098911. SELIBR 7263026.
- Stjernfelt, Bertil (1991). Ålands hav och öar - brygga eller barriär?: svensk-finsk försvarsfråga 1915-1945. Marinlitteraturföreningen, 0348-2405; 72 (in Swedish). Stockholm: Marinlitteraturfören. SELIBR 1264367.
- Stjernfelt, Bertil (1992). The Sinai peace front: UN peacekeeping operations in the Middle East, 1973-1980. Translated by Nihlén, Stig. London: Hurst. ISBN 185065090X. SELIBR 6427285.
- Stjernfelt, Bertil (1993). FN:s fredsoperationer: UN peace-keeping expanding, accelerating - if not exploding (in Swedish). Stockholm: Kungl. Krigsvetenskapsakademien. SELIBR 21441514.
- Stjernfelt, Bertil (1993). The peace operations of the United Nations: UN peace-keeping expanding, accelerating - if not exploding. [Stockholm]: [Kungl. Krigsvetenskapsakad.] SELIBR 1879334.
- Stjernfelt, Bertil (1993). Kampen för KA kustjägare. Tidskrift för kustartilleriet; 1993:2 (in Swedish). Stockholm: Tidskrift för kustartilleriet. SELIBR 21431843.
- Stjernfelt, Bertil; Böhme, Klaus-Richard; Calleman, Birger; Wojcikowski-Ericson, Marietta (2007). Hitler anfaller Polen: Westerplatte 1 september 1939 (in Swedish). Hallstavik: Svenskt militärhistoriskt bibliotek. ISBN 9789185789115. SELIBR 10576682.
