= Fallskärmsjägarna =

323rd Parachute Ranger Squadron
- Fallskärmsjägarna
- Active: 1952–present
- Country: Sweden
- Allegiance: Swedish Armed Forces
- Branch: Swedish Army
- Type: Special operations capable airborne ranger unit
- Size: Squadron
- Part of: 32nd Intelligence Battalion
- Garrison/HQ: Karlsborg, Västergötland
- Mottos: Vilja, mod och uthållighet ("Will, Courage and Perseverance")
- Engagements: KFOR; Operation Artemis; War in Afghanistan; Northern Mali conflict

Commanders
- Notable commanders: Nils-Ivar Carlborg

Insignia
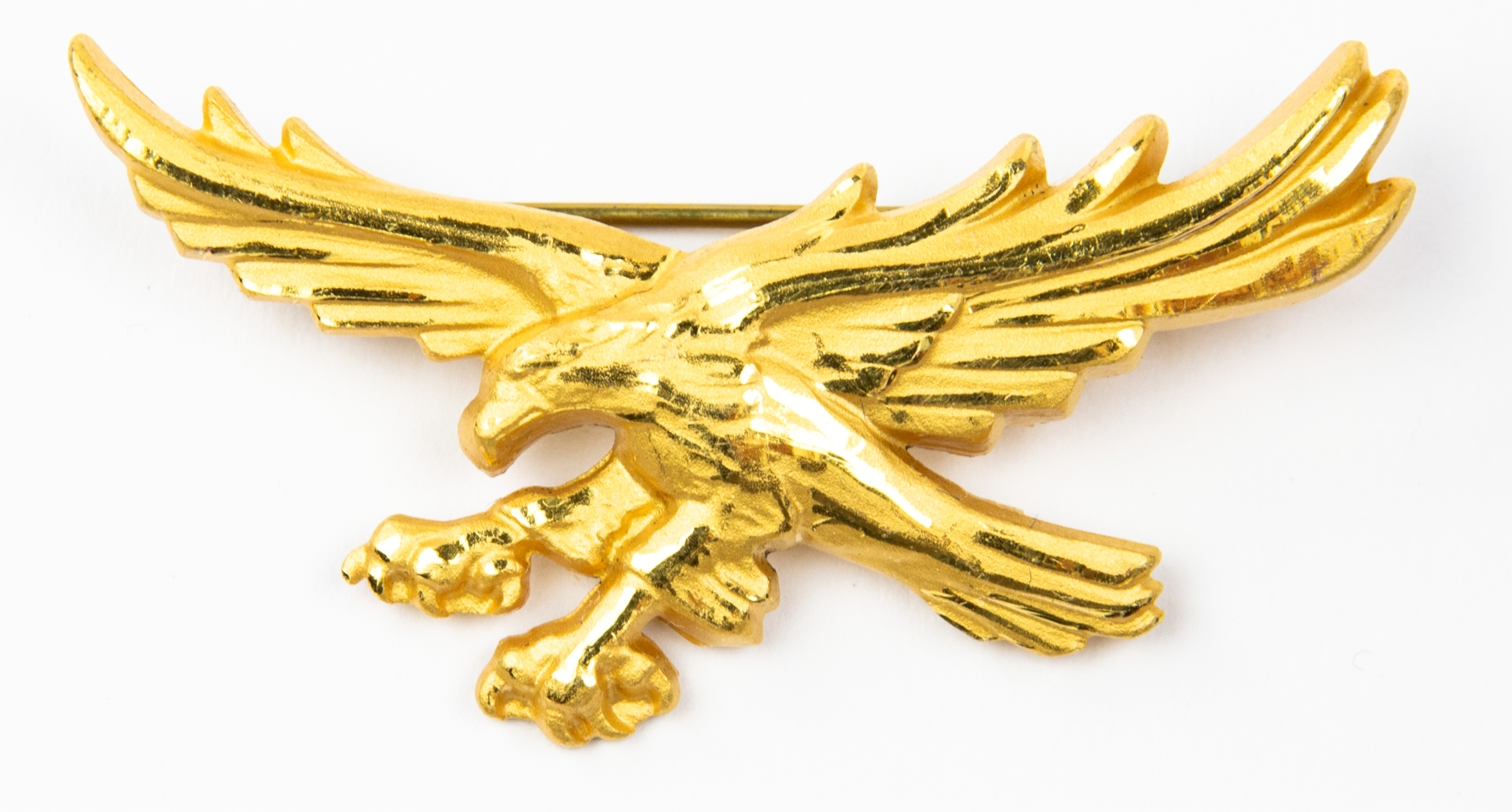
- Training insignia m/51-60

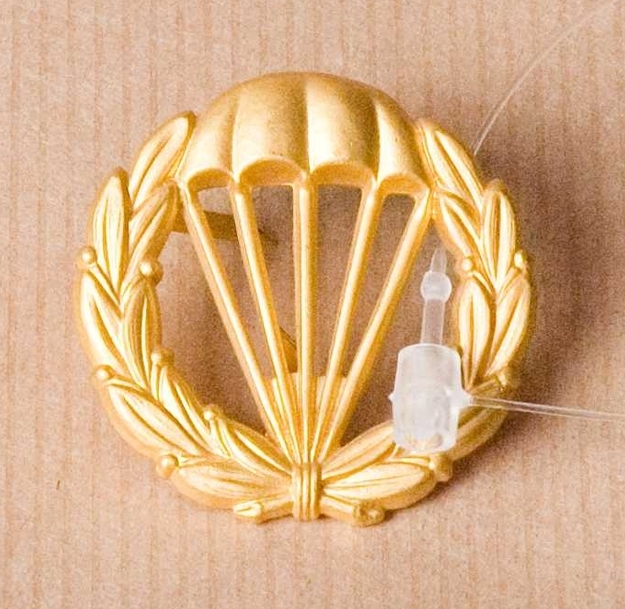
- Cap badge m/53-60

The 323rd Parachute Ranger Squadron (Swedish: 323. fallskärmsjägarskvadronen) or Fallskärmsjägarna (English: "Parachute Rangers" or "Airborne Rangers") is a Swedish military special operations capable airborne ranger unit specialising in long-range reconnaissance.

The unit is based at the Life Regiment Hussars (K 3) in Karlsborg at the Swedish Parachute Ranger School (FJS).

== History ==
The Swedish Army Paratroop School was created in 1952 by Captain Nils-Ivar Carlborg and modelled after the German and British post–World War II airborne commando forces such as the Parachute Regiment and the Special Air Service (SAS), with the objective of creating a highly mobile force which had the flexibility to operate behind enemy lines and carry out long range reconnaissance missions to passively gather military intelligence.

== Organization ==
The Parachute Rangers are organized under the 32nd Intelligence Battalion at the Life Regiment Hussars (K 3).

K 3 is also the home of the 31st Ranger Battalion, an airmobile infantry unit similar to the US 101st Airborne Division and the Swedish Armed Forces' special task group, the Särskilda operationsgruppen.

Around 2001, the Swedish Armed Forces organized a new special forces unit, called FJS IK, or Fallskärmsjägarnas Insatskompani (Parachute Ranger Rapid Reaction company), which consisted of contracted former Parachute Ranger conscripts for international deployment. In 2002, FJS IK were deployed to Afghanistan, and in 2003, FJS IK were deployed alongside Särskilda Skyddsgruppen (SSG) in Congo during Operation Artemis. In 2006 FJS IK was renamed Särskilda Inhämtningsgruppen (SIG), which along with SSG made up Sweden's special forces. These two units were later amalgamated into Särskilda operationsgruppen (SOG) in 2011. In 2006 the conscripted Parachute Ranger squadron was removed from SF command and moved to the 32nd Intelligence battalion in 2008. Since 2010 the unit is entirely composed of full-time personnel rather than conscripts and reservists.

The 323. Parachute Ranger Squadron as of 2019 is made up of three platoons:

- 1x Support platoon, consisting of a staff group, a signal & logistics support group, a 3-man TACP and a sniper section.
- 2x Ranger platoons, each consisting of three 8-man Ranger patrols.

== Selection & training ==
Today the unit is entirely composed of full-time professional personnel. In the past the unit was made up of both conscripts and commissioned officers but its configuration was changed between 1990–2000. Candidates today are required to have at least 9 months of service in the Swedish Armed Forces prior to applying to the unit. Either through conscription or active duty service.

Selection to the unit is one of the toughest in the Swedish Army, including a three-day pre-selection and three test weeks.

If selected the candidate starts the basic Parachute Ranger course which is roughly three months long with an attrition rate at over 50%. The course is considered to be one of the most physically and mentally demanding training programs within the Swedish Armed Forces. A candidate can at any time during the course (and in particular during the test weeks) be separated from the unit and sent home or transferred to other units in case standards are not met. Injuries are common and injured candidates are frequently given the opportunity to come back the following year if desired.

Towards the end of the course candidates are put through an 8 day long range reconnaissance test which is pass or fail, it later culminates in the “Eagle March”. The Eagle March is preceded by a number of squad tasks after which the units are deployed via parachute and set out to complete a 60–70 km march with a 30 kg combat pack in rough terrain followed by a 10 km individual navigation test-course carrying combat gear and weapons. The march and navigation test must be completed within 24 hours in order to be badged and be considered for further service with the unit. Note that "The Eagle March" must be successfully completed by all military personnel serving at the company once a year.

Successful candidates who complete the march within the prescribed time frame is awarded the "Golden Eagle". Candidates who successfully complete the training program may be considered for further service with the unit. If so, the candidate is put through another six months of training in order to become a fully badged and operational member of the unit.

== Operations ==
The Parachute Rangers operational field of expertise is intelligence gathering deep inside enemy-controlled territory. They have secondary duties in sabotage and tactical diversion. The unit has special training in Arctic warfare and can sustain operations for extended periods (in excess of one month) deep inside enemy territory without resupply or support from other parts of the armed forces. The primary means of infiltration is by parachute, both static line and MFF (HALO/HAHO), but the unit can also be deployed via helicopter or boats. The small and agile 8-man teams operate autonomously. Each patrol consists of:

A Team leader, a deputy team leader, a sniper, two demolitions expert/support gunners, a medic and a communications expert.

If required for the mission, an interpreter may be assigned to the unit to handle local civilian interaction or interrogations. The unit mainly conducts their operations on foot, but they may use all-terrain vehicles and snowmobiles if the missions demands it. All Rangers are trained combat swimmers as well, and can perform water jumps and infiltrate via water.

== International involvement ==
The Parachute Rangers have been involved in low intensity conflicts under UN flag, notably Kosovo and Bosnia, where they served as the intelligence platoon to KFOR, primarily working with human-based intelligence gathering (HUMINT). In 2003, the units contracted personnel deployed to Congo together with the SSG. The unit continuously had personnel deployed in Afghanistan as part of Sweden's contribution to the International Security Assistance Force. In 2015 the company formed the reconnaissance squadron of the first rotation of the Swedish Intelligence, Surveillance and Reconnaissance (ISR) Task Force in Mali.

== Insignia ==
The unit's insignia (förbandstecken) is a parachute circumscribed by laurel leaves. This is worn on a maroon beret, which is awarded after the first parachute jump. The maroon beret is a common headwear for parachutists in the western world's armed forces. The individual sign of having passed the unit's training course, which culminates in the Eagle March, is the Golden Eagle in metal which is worn on the left hand breast pocket on the dress uniform or as a patch on the right sleeve of the M/90 field uniform. The eagle is considered the real mark of a Parachute Ranger as it is only given to those who completed the training course, whereas the beret with the insignia is worn after having completed the first parachute jump. The eagle can be worn on uniforms in any unit as it is an award for completed training whereas the insignia shows the affiliation to a particular army unit.

== Similar units ==
- United Kingdom – Pathfinders
- France – 13th Parachute Dragoon Regiment
- United States – Regimental Reconnaissance Company
- Norway – Fallskjermjegertroppen
- Finland – Laskuvarjojääkärit

== See also ==
- Swedish Armed Forces
- Special forces
- Special Operations Task Group – SOG
- Special Protection Group – SSG
- Special Reconnaissance Group – SIG
- Swedish Coastal Rangers
