= Special Operations Group (Sweden) =

Swedish special forces unit

Special Operations Task Group
- Särskilda operationsgruppen
- Active: 2011–present
- Country: Sweden
- Allegiance: Swedish Armed Forces
- Type: Special forces
- Size: Classified
- Part of: Under the direct command of the Supreme Commander
- Garrison/HQ: Karlsborg
- Mottos: In praesenti - Enim futuro "At the present time - For the future"
- Engagements: KFOR; EUFOR Tchad/RCA; War in Afghanistan; Operation Inherent Resolve; Operation Barkhane; 2021 Kabul airlift

Commanders
- Notable commanders: Peter Hederstedt

Insignia
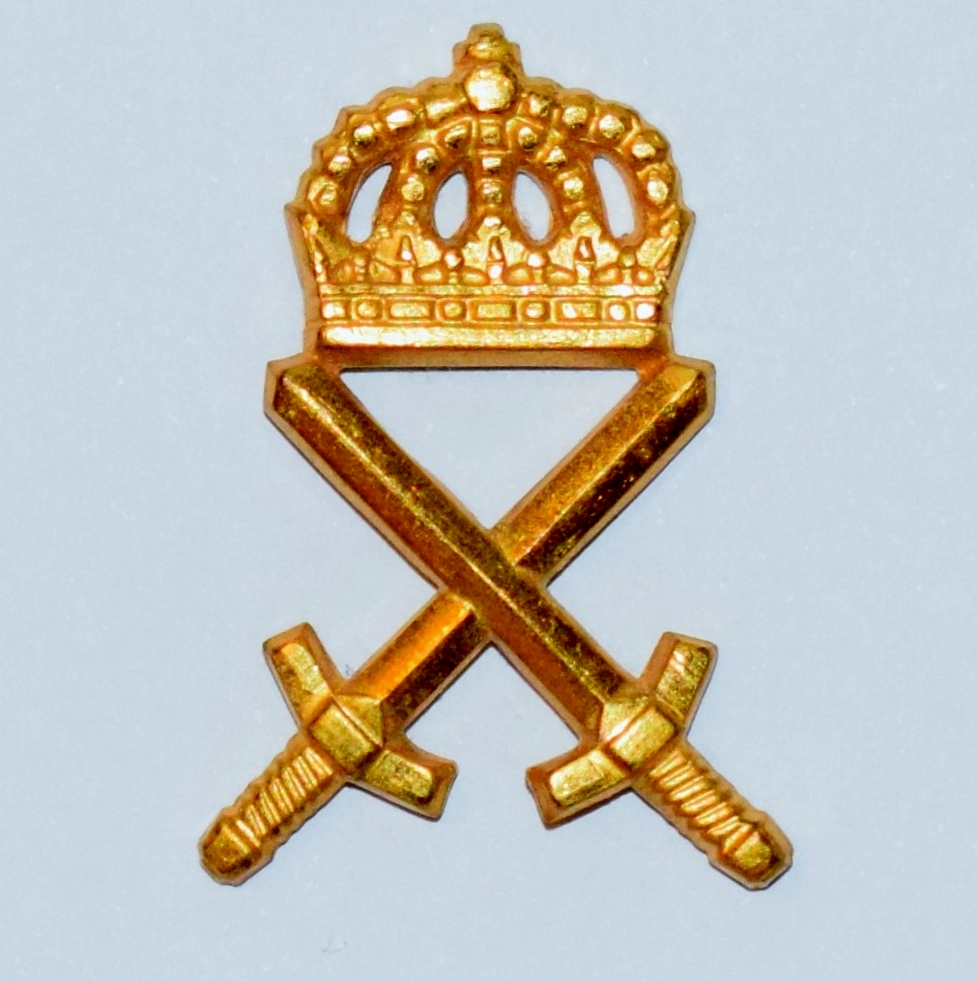
- Service badge

The Swedish Special Operations Task Group (Swedish: Särskilda operationsgruppen (SOG), lit. 'Special Operations Group'), is a special forces unit within the Swedish Armed Forces which has been active since 2011. The unit is headquartered at Karlsborg Fortress in Karlsborg, Västra Götaland County.

== History ==
Särskilda operationsgruppen was formed in 2011 by merging the Special Protection Group (SSG) and the Special Reconnaissance Group (SIG). Its first commander from 2011 to 2015 was colonel Peter Hederstedt.

== Organisation ==
The Special Operations Task Group (SOG) answers directly to the Supreme Commander and the Director Special Forces.

The unit, combined with the Special Forces Command (SFL), comprises the Swedish Armed Forces Special Forces (FM SF). In addition to this, there are several special forces support units (FM SOF). The personnel of which are specially selected, trained and equipped for air, sea and land infiltration, technical, logistical and medical support. For example, the Special Helicopter Group (SHG), Special Boat Unit (STE), Special Signals Unit (SSE), and the Section for Operative Technology (SOT).

SOG consists of two so-called response units (IE). IE1 is focused on combat tasks (Direct Action) and IE2 is focused on intelligence gathering (Special Reconnaissance). IE2 is known to utilize female intelligence personnel to conduct certain HUMINT tasks.

Each SOG response unit (IE) is organized in squadrons, troops, and patrols. Three 4-man patrols make up a troop, and an unknown number of troops make up a squadron.

Besides the operational elements of the unit, there is also a Training Wing, responsible for the selection and training of future and current operators. Each operator has a broader skill base than a regular soldier and one or two patrol skills at which he is exceptionally skilled.

A typical SOG team consists of four operators: a team leader, a demolitions expert/breacher, a communicator, and a combat medic. Each patrol can be augmented with EOD technicians, JTAC-specialists, military working dog handlers, or snipers.

Furthermore, every operator has an infiltration specialty in either military free fall (HALO/HAHO) or combat diving. All operators are qualified as static line parachutists and combat swimmers.

== Role ==
The most frequent usage of the SOG is during multi-national special operations such as ISAF in Afghanistan or Operation Inherent Resolve in Iraq.

SOG combat operations are of great strategic importance that cannot be accomplished by conventional forces or weapon systems.

Combat missions can be to eliminate high-value targets or objects of great importance to the enemy, to conduct complex rescue operations of Swedish personnel held captive or hostage, or to gather time-critical intelligence through action.

SOG can also, if needed and requested, augment the police counter-terrorism assets to intervene during domestic terrorism and/or hostage crisis due to new legislation implemented in 2006.

Special reconnaissance and intelligence gathering is intended to gather information of great tactical importance about the enemy´s activities, enemy personnel or other bits of information of operational significance.

Special forces can also be tasked with advising and training foreign military units as part of an international peace-keeping military operation.

== International operations ==
The unit maintains a high degree of readiness and can be deployed on short notice within a 6,000 kilometres (3,700 mi) radius of Stockholm and can operate in any environment, for example, jungle, desert, mountain/alpine, sub-arctic and urban.

The unit is deployed on request by the UN, EU or NATO, but must then be sanctioned on a political level.

Due to operational security, the unit's capabilities, equipment, operational methods, previous or on-going operations, and the identities of their personnel are classified.

The SOG's predecessors, the SSG and SIG, participated in operations in the Balkans, Congo, Chad and the Central African Republic. Swedish special forces have also been continuously deployed in Afghanistan from the beginning of the conflict up until the withdrawal of ISAF forces in 2014.

The unit maintained some presence in Afghanistan after the withdrawal of ISAF forces, as evident from a valour award given to a member of the unit, citing actions during combat in Kabul, while embedded with Norwegian special forces, in 2018.

From 2015, a contingent of around 30 operators from the SOG along with support elements participated in Operation Inherent Resolve, acting as advisors for Kurdish Peshmerga forces.

In February 2021, a Swedish 150 man strong special operations task force made up of SOG elements, helicopters and support staff deployed to Mali as part of Task Force Takuba, a multinational French led counter terrorism task force part of Operation Barkhane operating in the border region of Mali and Niger. The contribution to Takuba is separate from the ongoing conventional Swedish contribution to the UN mission MINUSMA.

The unit participated in the 2021 evacuation from Afghanistan where operators where deployed on the ground at Hamid Karzai International Airport tasked with supporting operations of the foreign office and migration agency.

Partly as a onboard security on the C130 flights between Kabul and Islamabad and partly as a task force locating Swedish passport holders and local staff in need of evacuation. The unit was given the mandate to operate outside the boundaries of the airport, but it's not known in what extent they did.

Members of the unit also responded to the 2021 Kabul airport attack, where they provided immediate medical aid to wounded US personnel and civilians as well as donating blood.

== Selection and training ==
Selection is open for Armed Forces members of both sexes who are at least eligible for specialist officer's training.

The candidates are advised to prepare themselves at least six months prior to the selection course and are invited to attend a pre-selection weekend where they will be tested and advised on their likelihood of success or failure and also where they need to improve.

The selection process takes 2–3 weeks and is held once a year. Historically, candidates for SOG’s predecessors, the SSG and SIG, were sought out by the unit and invited to attempt selection. Selection for SOG, however, is advertised on the Armed Forces website and at unit garrisons and is open for anyone who meets the basic requirements.

The selection consists of an extremely grueling field exercise, stretching over more than a week, where the candidates are tested on their fitness, fieldcraft and land navigation and the tests are conducted during great stress.

The second week consists of psychological tests, similar to those undertaken by fighter pilots. They are also tested for their predisposition for phobias, such as heights and confined spaces.

Typically, selection has a roughly 10% pass rate. If the candidate is successful, he/she will begin the basic operator course which lasts for 12 months and is divided into three blocks:

- Basic combat skills
- Patrol skills
- Specialist skills

Once completed, the operator will be put in an operational patrol within a troop and can be deployed with the unit.

Personnel applying to join the unit as EOD, JTAC or medical support operators undergo the same selection process as the normal operators but do a shorter eight month basic operator course, after which they continue with specialist training in the EOD, JTAC or medical function.

Operators train at their own compound at a secret location near Karlsborg, which, among shooting ranges, also features a large multi-story CQB-building, with bullet-absorbing lining in its walls.

The building also facilitates helicopter insertions on its roof. Much of their training is also conducted internationally, often alongside the special forces units of Sweden's NATO partners as well as the counter terrorism unit and other tactical units of the Swedish police.

== Equipment and armament ==
The SOG differs greatly from the rest of the Swedish Armed Forces in its equipment and armament.

The most noticeable difference is their usage of Multicam rather than M90. Operators wear combat uniforms from Crye Precision or Arcteryx, a variety of different plate carriers and Ops Core FAST ballistic helmets.

Besides the differences in equipment, the SOG issues different firearms than the conventional military as well. Support weapons such as machine guns and anti-armor weapons differ from those usually employed by the conventional military.

Model	Type	Caliber	Origin	Notes
Glock 17	Semi-automatic pistol	9×19mm Parabellum	Austria	Standard sidearm
Heckler & Koch MP5	Submachine gun	9×19mm Parabellum	Germany	A3 and SD6 variants in use
Heckler & Koch MP7A1	Submachine gun	4.6×30mm	Germany	Standard submachine gun
Remington 870	Shotgun	12 Gauge	United States	Used for breaching purposes
LWRC M6	Assault rifle	5.56×45mm NATO	United States	Standard issue rifle
LWRC M6	Assault rifle	7.62x51mm NATO	United States	Standard issue rifle
Ak 5C	Assault rifle	5.56×45mm NATO	Sweden	Current standard Swedish issue rifle
Heckler & Koch G36	Assault rifle	5.56×45mm NATO	Germany	Formerly issued
Barrett M82A1	Sniper rifle	.50 BMG	United States	Used in Afghanistan.
Heckler & Koch HK417	Sniper rifle	7.62x51mm NATO	Germany	Issued to snipers
Sako TRG-42	Sniper rifle	.338 Lapua Magnum	Finland	Issued to snipers
Accuracy International Arctic Warfare	Sniper rifle	7.62x51mm NATO	United Kingdom	Designated as the Psg 90
FN Minimi	Light machine gun	7.62x51mm NATO	Belgium	Designated as the Ksp 90
Ksp 58	General-purpose machine gun	7.62x51mm NATO	Sweden	Swedish MAG

== Heraldry ==
The SOG coat of arms is blazoned thus: Upon a black shield is a six-pointed star in silver in the upper dexter corner. The field is crowned with the royal crown and laid upon a towering sword of gold.

The coat of arms was developed by the Armed Forces Board of Traditions and symbolizes the unit's ability of unconventional problem solving, the effectiveness of duty and clandestine operations, and the asymmetrically positioned star symbolizes asymmetric warfare.

The unit insignia, worn on the uniform by qualified operators consists of a winged Norse dagger Seax with an asymmetrically positioned six-pointed star.

Personnel within the Swedish Special Operations Forces, SOG and its support units also wear an olive green beret with a black, embroidered cap badge, the only non-metal cap badge within the Swedish Armed Forces. It is normally worn in public only by the Director Special Forces, a brigadier general, since the identities of all the operatives are classified.

== See also ==
- Special Protection Group
- Special Reconnaissance Group
- Swedish Parachute Rangers
- Swedish Coastal Rangers (KJ)
- Swedish Army Ranger Battalion (AJB)
