= Särskilda skyddsgruppen =

- Active: 1994–2011
- Country: Sweden
- Allegiance: Swedish Armed Forces
- Type: Special forces
- Role: Direct action, Long-range reconnaissance, Counterterrorism, VIP-protection, Personnel recovery
- Size: Classified
- Part of: Under the direct command of the Supreme Commander of the Swedish Armed Forces
- Garrison/HQ: Karlsborg, Västergötland
- Engagements: Operation Artemis; Operation Enduring Freedom; EUFOR Tchad/RCA; Bosnian War; Kosovo War; Republic of Macedonia; Liberia; Lebanon

Särskilda skyddsgruppen (SSG) (Special Protection Group) was a special operations unit of the Swedish military which officially became active in 1994. The exact number of operatives was classified but was thought to be between 60 and 80, with an average age of 31. SSG could have been deployed to achieve specific, well-defined, and often time-critical results of strategic or operational significance which couldn't have been achieved using conventional forces. Typical missions undertaken by SSG were to engage and destroy targets of great significance to the enemy, to rescue people captured by the enemy or held hostage, and to gather intelligence through combat. SSG's missions required its operators to covertly infiltrate and move inside hostile territory and remain undetected for very long periods.

== History ==
In 1994 the Särskilda skyddsgruppen (Special Protection Group, SSG) unit was founded, among others by the then captain Peter Hederstedt. The unit's existence wasn't made public until 1997. There were several reasons why the SSG was formed: one was the threat of foreign special forces, which intended to kill the senior military and civilian officials (for example politicians). The SSG was designed to perform operations which existing military regiments did not have the skills to carry out. The other was that in the early 1990s the missions of the Swedish Army were much more complex and sensitive than before.

In 2002, Afghanistan, the SSG contributed to security and personal protection of the Afghan king, Mohammed Zahir Shah, returning from exile in Italy. The SSG along with other special operations forces also trained Afghan military personnel.

In November 2003, SSG along with FJS/IK (Parachute Ranger Rapid Reaction Company, later SIG) were sent to the Democratic Republic of the Congo, with members of French special forces CPA10 and 1st Marine Infantry Paratroopers Regiment for Operation Artemis. The mission was to stabilize the situation in the area around the town of Bunia and to stop the killing. Shortly after Operation Artemis, a new unit, Särskilda Inhämtningsgruppen (Special Reconnaissance Group, SIG) was founded out of the FJS/IK whose object was information gathering.

On 17–18 March 2004, during the riots in Čaglavica near Pristina in Kosovo, SSG operators conducted counter sniper operations. More than 30 SVD Dragunov sniper rifles were recovered in one hour after deputy battalion commander had granted them "every permission to fire in all of Kosovo".

On 25 November 2005, four SSG operatives were wounded by an improvised explosive device (IED) during a reconnaissance mission in northern Afghanistan. Of the wounded, Jesper Lindblom died due to his injuries on 9 December 2005 and Thomas Bergqvist died after having been airlifted to a hospital in Europe.

In 2008, SSG and SIG were deployed to Chad, to prepare for the Swedish contribution of marines to EUFOR Tchad/RCA.

In 2011, the SSG and SIG were merged to create the Särskilda operationsgruppen (Special Operations Group, SOG).

== Recruitment and training ==
SSG drew its personnel from officers (lower ranks might have undergone officer training to be able to serve in the unit) of all three branches of the military, however mainly from the Life Regiment Hussars (K 3) (Airborne & Reconnaissance Infantry), Kustjägarna (Coastal Rangers), Army Ranger Battalion and each applicant must have passed a two-week-long selection process. Before selection took place, the applicants were invited to attend a pre-selection weekend, where they would have been tested and given notice of the likelihood of failure or success and how to improve themselves. Selection might only have been attempted once unless there were certain mitigating circumstances that caused the applicant to fail.

Because of its level of secrecy, the time it took to train a recruit had not been made public by the SSG but according to the armed forces' website, basic operator training took more than one year. Each soldier received common training including parachuting, scuba diving and VIP protection. As an operative he would have also received special training within different areas such as HAHO/HALO parachuting, explosives, first aid, sniping and special weapons training. An SSG operative had the ability to insert and extract by several means such as on foot, paradrop, submerged, and by boat and vehicle.

Women could have applied to the unit as Intelligence Operators.

Training was often held in countries other than Sweden, and joint exercises with other countries special forces were frequent.

== Commanders ==
- 1994–????: Dag Ernholdt
- ????–????: Hans-Alm
- 2006–2008: Ronny Modig

== See also ==
- Special forces
- Swedish Armed Forces
- Särskilda Inhämtningsgruppen
- Kustjägarna
- Fallskärmsjägarna
