= Särskilda inhämtningsgruppen =

Särskilda inhämtningsgruppen (SIG)
- Active: 2007–2011
- Country: Sweden
- Branch: Swedish Armed Forces
- Type: Special Forces
- Role: Intelligence gathering through long range reconnaissance, close target reconnaissance, HUMINT, covert surveillance and special reconnaissance.
- Size: Classified
- Part of: Under the direct command of the Supreme Commander of the Swedish Armed Forces
- Garrison/HQ: Karlsborg, Västergötland
- Battle honours: Operation Artemis; Operation Enduring Freedom

Commanders
- Current commander: Classified

Särskilda inhämtningsgruppen, SIG (Special Reconnaissance Group) was one of the two Swedish special operations units and was created in 2007, when it broke out of the Swedish Parachute Ranger School. The exact number of operatives was classified but is thought to have been between 50 and 70, with an average age of 30. SIG was deployed for clandestine surveillance and reconnaissance. The aim was to gather intelligence on activities, certain individuals, or anything of strategic importance. The difference between SIG and more regular ISTAR and reconnaissance units was that missions undertaken by SIG were more dangerous. Missions undertaken by SIG required its operators to covertly infiltrate and move inside hostile territory for long periods without detection.

The SSG and the SIG merged in 2011 as Särskilda operationsgruppen (Special Operations Group, SOG).

== See also ==
- Särskilda Skyddsgruppen
- Fallskärmsjägarna
