= West Coast Naval Command =

- Västkustens marinkommando
- Active: 1928–2000
- Country: Sweden
- Allegiance: Swedish Armed Forces
- Branch: Swedish Navy
- Type: Naval command
- Role: Operational, territorial and tactical activities
- Size: Staff
- Part of: CM (1928–1966); Milo V (1966–1993); Milo S (1993–2000)
- Garrison/HQ: Gothenburg
- Anniversaries: 15 April, 6 June, 14 November

Insignia
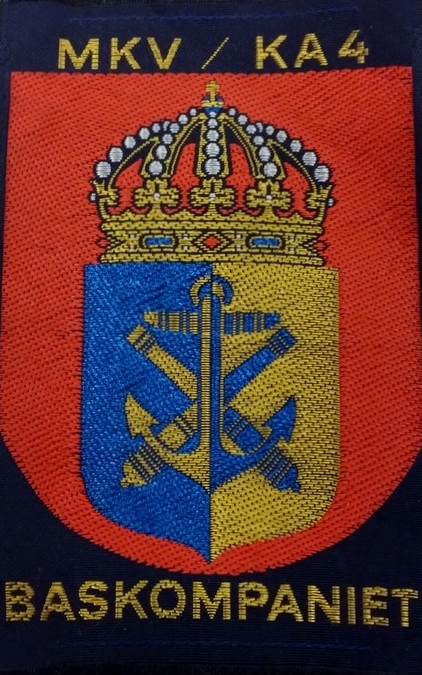
- HQ Company patch

The West Coast Naval Command (Swedish: Västkustens marinkommando, MKV/Fo 32) was a naval command within the Swedish Navy that operated in various forms in from 1928 to 2000. The unit was based in Gothenburg.

== History ==
The West Coast Naval Command was formed as a war unit on 1 January 1928, with the name West Coast Naval District. The background was the lack of clear command conditions and a unified staff for the Swedish coastal areas in war or in danger of war. Through the Defence Act of 1925, the territorial waters along the Swedish coast were divided into naval districts, where the West Coast Naval District constituted one of six naval districts. The naval district included the territorial waters, the naval defence district and the part that constituted land territory. By the Defence Act of 1936, it was decided that all naval districts would be peace-organized from 1 July 1937. With the new organization, the naval district came to include staff, personnel department, quartermaster administration, health care administration, kameralkontor, and from 1 August 1939 ship depots were added, as well as naval depots and Älvsborg Coastal Artillery Detachment. From 1 October 1942, the organization was expanded in the form of the Gothenburg Department for the ship units, the Gothenburg Coastal Artillery Defence and Älvsborg Coastal Artillery Regiment, and in 1943 with the Gothenburg Naval Station (Göteborgs örlogsstation) and the Gothenburg Naval Yard (Göteborgs örlogsvarv). In the years 1939–1945, the naval district also consisted of the Väner Department (Väneravdelningen) with associated ship detachment, fish distribution center and a coast guard department.

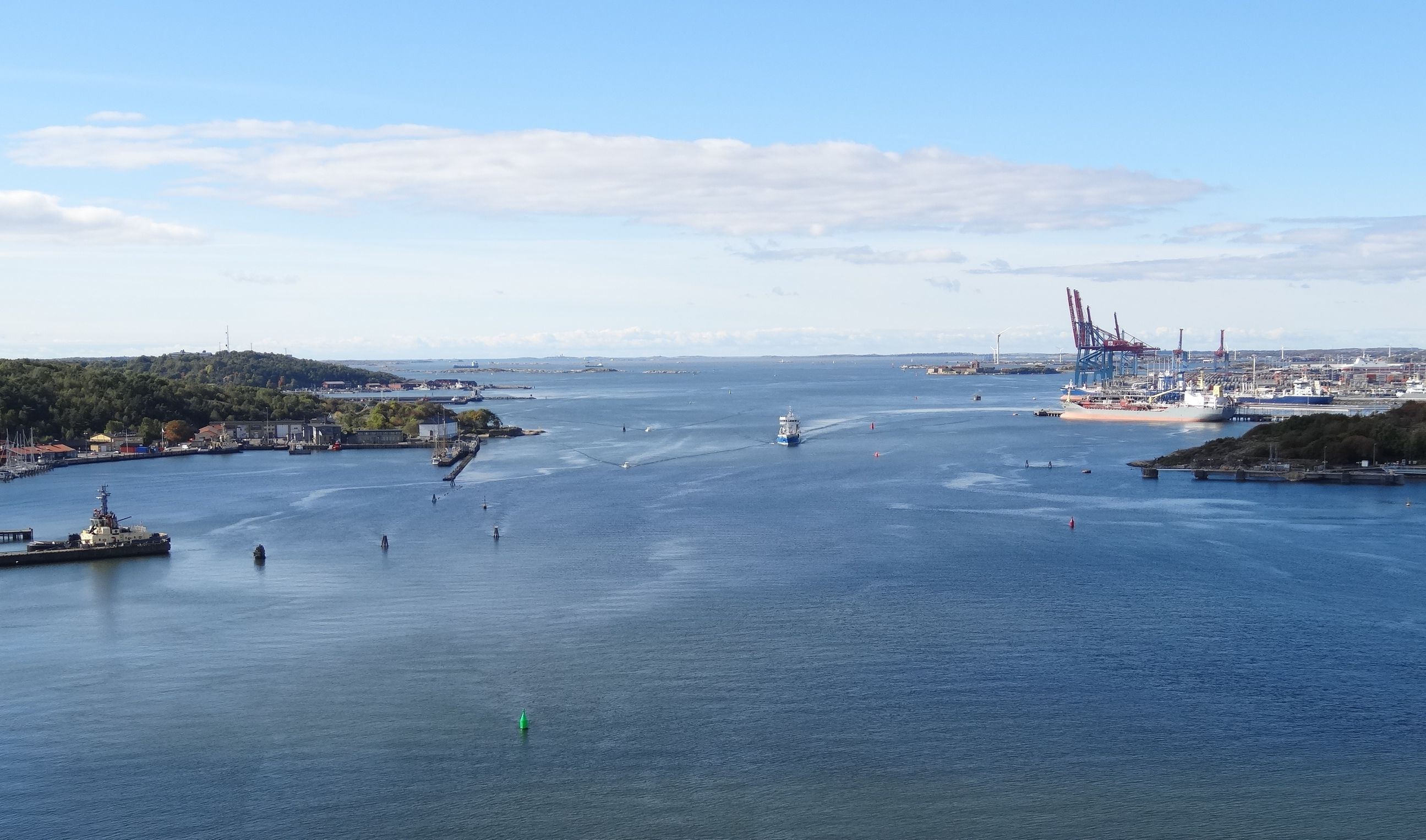
The inlet to the Port of Gothenburg with Nya Varvet to the left where the command was located.

On 1 October 1957, the West Coast Naval District was reorganized into Naval Command West, where Gothenburg Coastal Artillery Defence was separated so that on 1 July 1958, it formed its own authority. Gothenburg Coastal Artillery Defence itself was amalgamated with Gothenburg and Bohus as well as Halland Defence District (Fo 32/31) and adopted the name Gothenburg and Bohus as well as Halland Defence District together with Gothenburg Coastal Artillery Defence (Gbk/Fo 32/31). The new organization consisted of a command organization with staff and administration, the 5th Coastal Artillery Brigade, the 12th Coastal Artillery Group and the Bohus Group (Bohusgruppen). From 1960, the 2nd Helicopter Division (2. helikopterdivisionen) was also added, which was initially based at Torslanda Airfield. On 1 October 1966, a new regional command was introduced within the Swedish Armed Forces. Thus, the Naval Command West adopted the new name West Coast Naval Base. The West Coast Naval Base was in turn directly subordinate to the military commander of the Western Military District, from having previously been directly subordinate to the Chief of the Navy. The West Coast Naval Base in turn consisted of staff and administration, as well as Älvsborg Radio, the coast guard organization and ships and helicopter units.

Prior to the Government Bill 1978/79:96, the Swedish government proposed to the Riksdag that the three authorities West Coast Naval Base (ÖrlB V), Gothenburg Coastal Artillery Defence with Gothenburg and Bohus Defence District (GbK/Fo 32) and Älvsborg Coastal Artillery Regiment (KA 4) be amalgamated into one authority in the peace organization. The background to the proposal for a amalgamation was due to savings reasons, where the Swedish Armed Forces and the government considered that the naval activities on the west coast could be coordinated under a joint command. On 15 February 1979, the Riksdag adopted the Government Bill. On 1 January 1981, the new organization came into force, under the name West Coast Naval Command with Älvsborg Coastal Artillery Regiment (MKV/KA 4).

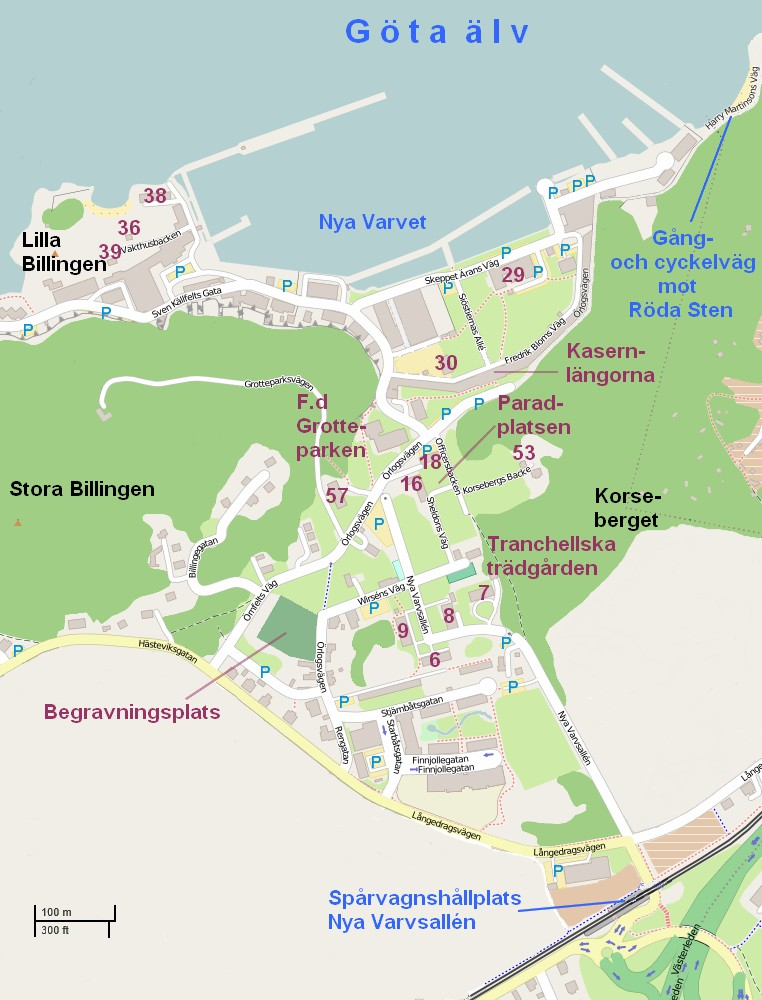
Map of Nya Varvet.

Prior to the Defence Act of 1982, the government proposed to the Riksdag in its Bill 1981/82:102 new savings within the Swedish Armed Forces. Among other things, that the basic training at the West Coast Military Command with Älvsborg Coastal Artillery Regiment would be reduced to a greater extent than what the Supreme Commander had proposed. The remaining basic training would then be limited to mainly radar and naval mine training. Furthermore, the government proposed that and that Älvsborg Coastal Artillery Regiment should be separated from the West Coast Military Command, and instead form an independent unit. The government also proposed, for regional policy reasons, that the Swedish Navy Officer College in Gothenburg (Marinens officershögskola i Göteborg, MOHS G) and the main part of the Swedish Navy Medical School (Marinens sjukvårdsskola, MSjukvS) be located in Karlskrona. The background to the savings and the restructuring in Gothenburg, was due to the fact that the government wanted to keep the basic training at Härnösand Coastal Artillery Regiment (KA 5). The activities that remained at the West Coast Military Command in Gothenburg were concentrated to Västerberget and Käringberget. Through Government Bill 1983/84:112 the Riksdag decided on 15 March 1984 that Nya Varvet would be left, and that the basic training battalion at Älvsborg Coastal Artillery Regiment would be disbanded, and that rear maintenance and major inspections of naval ships would be concentrated at the South Coast Naval Base and the East Coast Naval Base.

On 1 July 1986, a major reform of the Navy was carried out, when all naval bases amalgamated with the coastal artillery and formed naval commands. The new organization in Gothenburg largely reflected the previous one. At that time, Älvsborg Coastal Artillery Regiment already had a joint staff with the command. The most obvious change was that the command changed its name to the West Coast Naval Command, and where Älvsborg Coastal Artillery Regiment became a training unit within the command but with its own regimental staff.

Prior to the Defence Act of 1996, stage 2, the government proposed to the Riksdag to reduce the number of defence district staffs from 24 to 16 staffs. Among other things, it was proposed that the defence district staff in Borås should be disbanded. In the government's budget bill 1997/98:1, the government also proposed that the defence district staff in Skövde should be disbanded. This is against the background that Västra Götaland County would form a defence district with a defence district staff in Gothenburg at the West Coast Naval Command. In its place for the two former defence district staffs in Borås and Skövde, the Skaraborg Group (Skaraborgsgruppen) and the Älvsborg Group (Älvsborgsgruppen) were formed. As a further decision in the Defence Act of 1996, Öresund Naval District (Öresunds marindistrikt) was also proposed to be included in the West Coast Naval Command. The new organization, which the Riksdag adopted on two occasions, came into force on 1 January 1998, and where the West Coast Naval Command was given the somewhat unusually long name "West Coast Naval Command including the Öresund Naval District and Västra Götaland Defence District (MKV/Fo 32)". In everyday speech, however, the West Coast Naval Command was used. Prior to the Defence District, the Swedish Armed Forces proposed to the government that training activities at the Gothenburg Marine Brigade should cease, however, the government considered in its bill that, given the importance of the Gothenburg area, training of amphibious units would be maintained. However, there was a change in the Defence Act regarding the coastal artillery, that the production responsibility for the Gothenburg Marine Brigade ceased on 31 December 1997, as well as the production responsibility for the 12th Helicopter Division (12. helikopterdivisionen).

Prior to the Defence Act of 2000, the government proposed in its bill to the Riksdag that the tactical level should be reduced by phasing out division and defence district staffs as well as naval commands and air commands. This is to design an Army Tactical Command, Naval Tactical Command and Air Force Tactical Command which would be co-located with the operations command. The proposal adopted by the Riksdag meant that all division and defence district staffs as well as naval commands and air commands were disbanded. On 30 June 2000, the West Coast Naval Command was disbanded. From 1 July 2000, the operations was transformed into a decommissioning organization, which operated until 31 March 2001.

== Operations ==
When the West Coast Naval Command was formed in 1928, the naval district commander would exercise command over all units, bodies and institutions within the naval district, which included local naval forces, naval fortifications, coastal artillery defence, naval station (or naval depot) and naval shipyards. With the expansion of the unit during World War II, large parts of the naval defence on the west coast were demobilized. However, the mine sweeping units remained, which cleared naval mines along the west coast until 1976, when all Swedish waters were declared free of mines. From 1 October 1958, the Naval Command's primary mission was to protect maritime import traffic from enemy submarines, aircraft, and mines. The coastal artillery defence had by this time been separated and formed an independent authority. The commander of the Naval Command West was directly subordinate to the Chief of the Navy regarding the operational command of the naval forces. On 1 October 1966, a new regional leadership was introduced throughout the Swedish Armed Forces, which meant that the operational responsibility was transferred to the military commander of the Western Military District. With the new organization, the protection of maritime import traffic was downgraded in favor of strengthening the invasion defense.

In connection with the formation of Naval Command West on 1 July 1986, the command was organized into two parts, tactical command for land and sea and division into sections. In addition to the commander of the Naval Command, the position of deputy commander of the Naval Command was established, and where the role of cief of staff was dedicated to an army officer. Through the Defence Act of 1996, the command was given two new tasks, to support or participate in international operations and to support society in the event of severe strains. The new support to society was noticed in 1999, for example, when a fire occurred on MS Scandinavian Star and in the 2000 floods in Sweden, which affected Dalsland, among other places. Through the Defence Act of 2000, the West Coast Naval Command was disbanded on 30 June 2000. Before the command was disbanded, a handover ceremony was held on 20 June 2000 at Muskö Naval Base. Where the naval operational responsibility was handed over to the commander of the Naval Tactical Command, at the same time as the commander of the West Coast Naval Command received the ground territorial responsibility for Scania Defence District (Skåne försvarsområde, Fo 14), Blekinge Defence District (Blekinge försvarsområde, Fo 15), Småland Defence District (Smålands försvarsområde, Fo 17) and Halland Defence District (Hallands försvarsområde, Fo 31). From 1 July 2000, the Southern Military District was formed, which took over the territorial responsibility as well as a large part of the staff from the West Coast Naval Command, which then consisted of about 50% army officers.

== Units ==
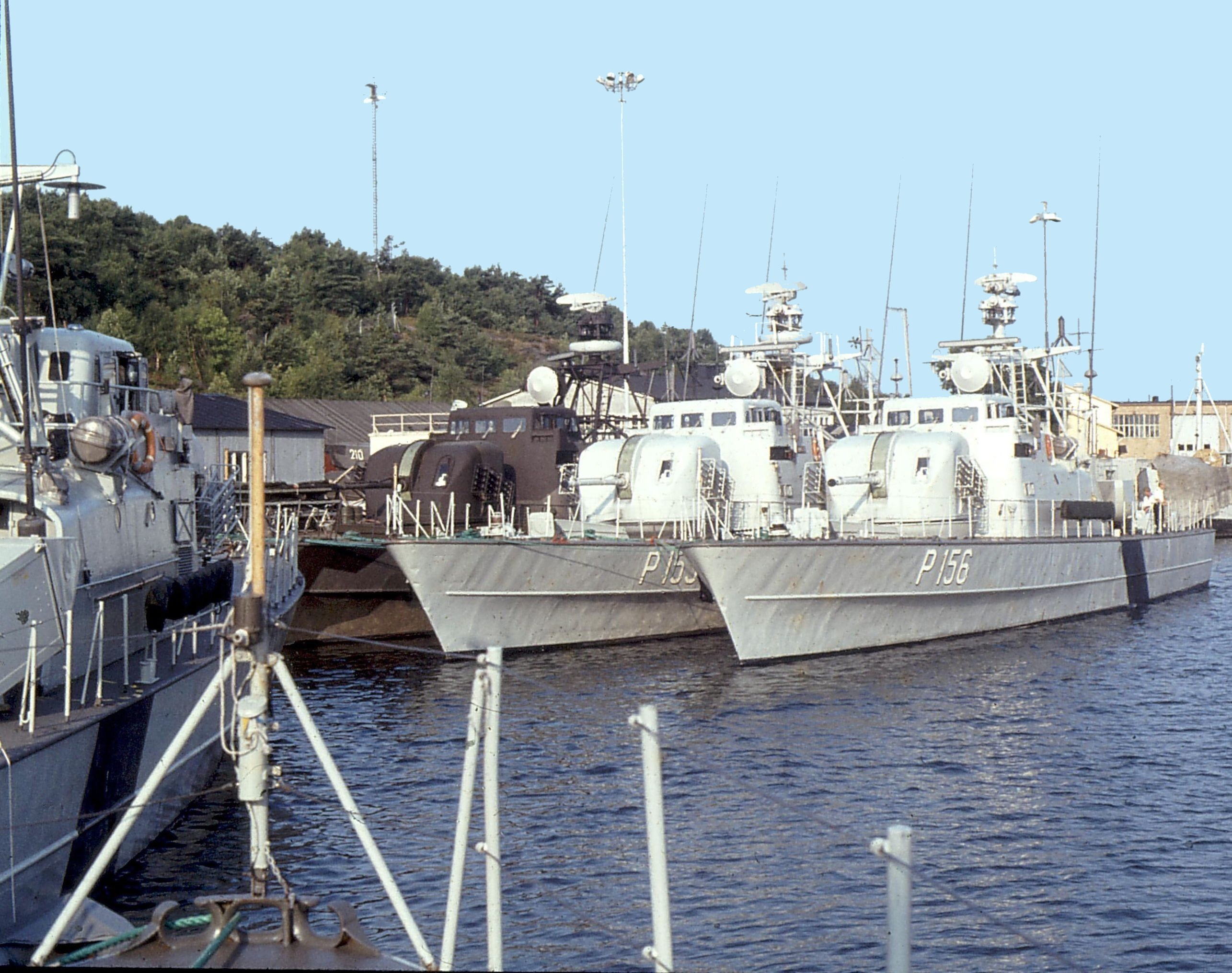
5th Patrol Boat Division moored at West Coast Military Command at Nya Varvet in Gothenburg in the summer of 1982.

From 1 October 1966, the unit consisted of the 1st Frigate Flotilla (1. fregattflottiljen), the 6th Submarine Flotilla (6. ubåtsflottiljen), the 15th Torpedo Boat Division (15. torpedbåtsdivisionen), the 3rd Minelayer Flotilla (3. minfartygsflottiljen), the 6th Mine-Sweeping Detachment (6. minröjningsavdelningen), the 2nd Helicopter Division (2. helikopterdivisionen), the 52nd Air Reconnaissance Group (52. flygspaningsgruppen) (from the Swedish Air Force) and the 145th HQ Battalion (145. basbataljonen) and 147th HQ Battalion (147. basbataljonen) from the Swedish Army. From 1 July 1986, the unit organization consisted of staff with a production, personnel and fortification unit. The units within the command consisted of Älvsborg Coastal Artillery Regiment, the 6th Mine Warfare Division (6. minkrigsavdelningen), the 12th Helicopter Division (12. helikopterdivisionen), the 18th Patrol Boat Division (18. patrullbåtsdivisionen), and the Western Naval Command Maintenance Battalion (Västra marinkommandounderhållsbataljonen), as well as the Bohus Group (Bohusgruppen) and the Gothenburg Group (Göteborgsgruppen). From 1 July 1995, the unit organization consisted of staff with naval surveillance and radio station, 18th Patrol Boat Division, 6th Mine Warfare Division, 12th Helicopter Division, Gothenburg Marine Regiment, four defence district infantry groups (försvarsområdesstridsgrupper), two city infantry battalions (stadsskyttebataljoner) and the Western Naval Command Maintenance Battalion.

=== 12th Helicopter Division ===
The 12th Helicopter Division (12. helikopterdivisionen, 12. hkpdiv) was a helicopter division that operated from 1959 to 1997. The division was from 1959 to 1969 based at Torslanda Airfield and from 1969 to 1997 at Säve Depot. From 1998, the division was part of the Swedish Armed Forces Helicopter Wing.

=== 18th Patrol Boat Division ===
The 18th Patrol Boat Division (18. patrullbåtsdivisionen, 18.ptrbdiv) was a Swedish surface combat division that operated from 1976 to 2001. The division from 1976 to 1986 based at Nya Varvet, and from 1986 to 2001 at Tångudden. After the Western Naval Command was disbanded, the division was transferred organizationally to the 3rd Surface Warfare Flotilla until it was disbanded on 1 June 2001.

=== Bohusgruppen ===
The Bohus Group (Bohusgruppen) was formed on 1 July 1958, and had its staff initially located in central Uddevalla. From 1992, the staff was co-located with the navy at Gullmars Base (Gullmarsbasen). In connection with the Defence Act of 2000, the defence district group was reorganized into a military district group (militärdistriktsgrupp) and was transferred organizationally to the Southern Military District on 1 July 2000.

=== Gothenburg Group ===
The Gothenburg Group (Göteborgsgruppen) was formed on 1 January 1986, and had its staff initially located at Kviberg. From 1994, the staff was co-located with other operations at Käringberget. In connection with the Defence Act of 2000, the defence district group was reorganized into a military district group (militärdistriktsgrupp) and was transferred organizationally to the Southern Military District on 1 July 2000.

=== Skaraborg Group ===
The Skaraborg Group (Skaraborgsgruppen) was formed on 1 January 1998 in connection with the disbandment of Skaraborg Defence District (Skaraborgs försvarsområde) and was amalgamated into the Västra Götaland Defence District. The Skaraborg Group's unit command was co-located with other operations within the Skövde Garrison. In connection with the Defence Act of 2000, the defence district group was reorganized into a military district group (militärdistriktsgrupp) and was transferred organizationally to the Southern Military District on 1 July 2000.

=== Älvsborg Group ===
The Älvsborg Group (Älvsborgsgruppen) was formed on 1 January 1998 in connection with the disbandment of Älvsborg Defence District (Älvsborgs försvarsområde) which amalgamated into the Västra Götaland Defence District. The Älvsborg Group's unit command was located within the Älvsborg Regiment's former barracks area. In connection with the Defence Act of 2000, the defence district group was reorganized into a military district group (militärdistriktsgrupp) and was transferred organizationally to the Southern Military District on 1 July 2000.

=== Älvsborg Coastal Artillery Regiment ===
The Älvsborg Coastal Artillery Regiment (KA 4) was a Swedish coastal artillery unit that operated from 1942 to 2000. From 1981 to 1997, the regiment was part of the West Coast Naval Command. The unit command was located at Käringberget.

=== Västra Götaland Defence District ===
The Västra Götaland Defence District (Fo 32), originally the Gothenburg and Bohus Defence District (F 32), was formed on 1 October 1942, and had its staff initially located in central Gothenburg. From 1958, the staff was co-located with the Gothenburg Coastal Artillery Defence (GbK). In connection with the OLLI reform (OLLI-reformen), the Gothenburg and Bohus Defence District (Fo 32) was formed on 1 July 1975, which amalgamated into and got a joint staff with Gothenburg Coastal Artillery Defence.

On 1 January 1998, Skaraborg Defence District (Skaraborgs försvarsområde, Fo 34) and Älvsborg Defence District (Älvsborgs försvarsområde, Fo 35) were added, which together with Gothenburg and Bohus Defence District (Fo 32) formed Västra Götaland Defence District (Fo 32). The defence district was disbanded together with the regiment on 30 June 2000.

=== Öresund Naval District ===
The Öresund Naval District (Öresunds marindistrikt, MDÖ) was formed on 1 January 1928 as a military unit. From 1936, the unit was also organized as a peace unit. In connection with the Defence Act of 1996, Öresund Naval District was disbanded as an independent unit, when it amalgamated on 1 January 1998 into the West Coast Naval Command.

== Locations and training areas ==
=== Locations ===
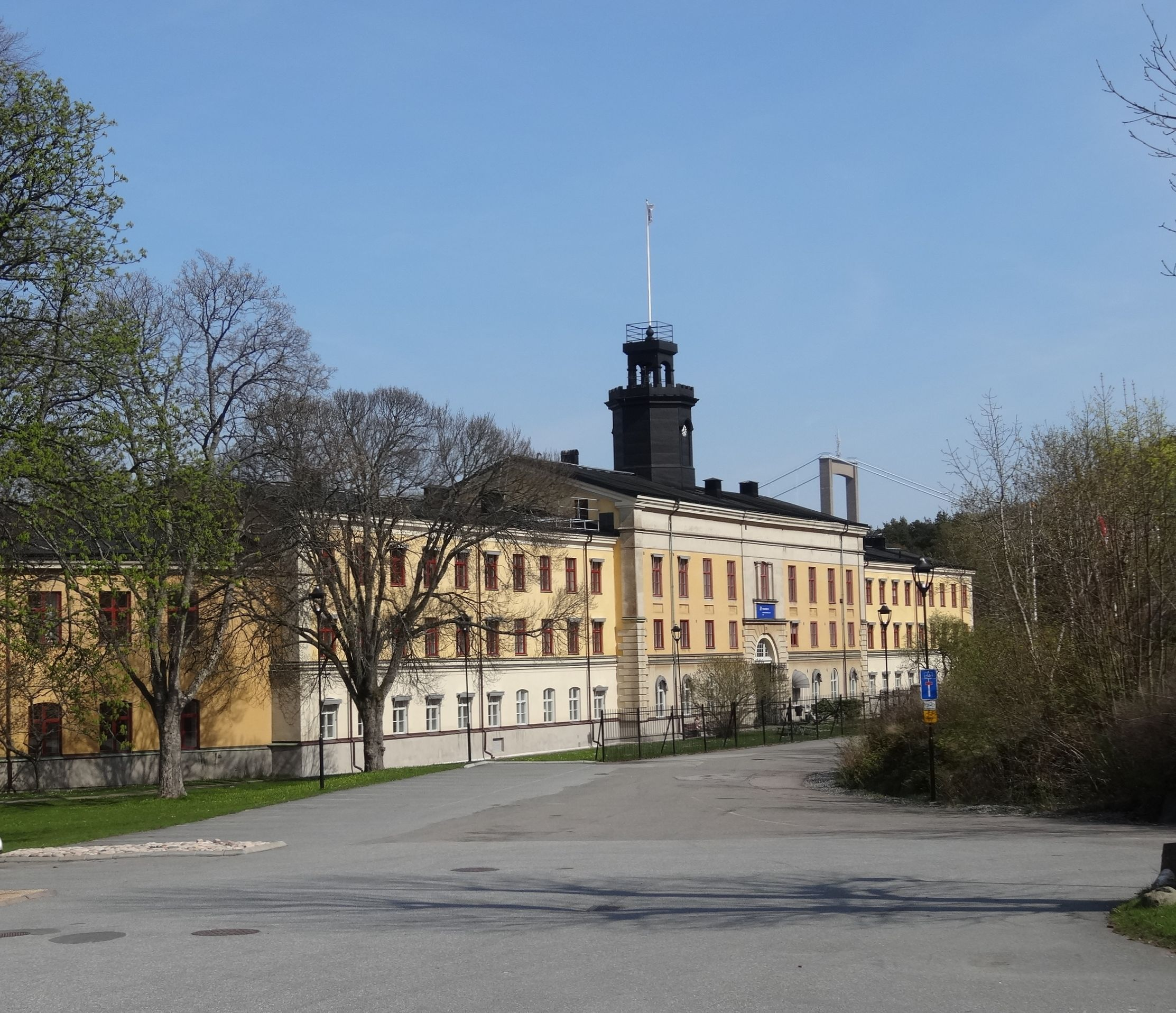
Main building at Nya Varvet.

When the West Coast Naval District was formed as a peace unit, its permanent organization was relocated to Nya Varvet in western Gothenburg. In addition to the construction work that was going on from 1937, buildings were taken over from the commandant of Älvsborg Fortress. The port was dredged and new quays, barracks, storage and housing were built. In 1944, the naval district's chancellery building was completed, however, its war headquarters was blasted into a mountain facility at Nya Varvet. During the 1950s and 1960s, the unit command and parts of the ship portfolio were relocated to Munkedal and Gullmars Base in Skredsvik. After the West Coast Naval Base (ÖrlB V), the Gothenburg Coastal Artillery Defence with the Gothenburg and Bohus Defence District (GbK/Fo 32) and Älvsborg Coastal Artillery Regiment (KA 4) amalgamated into one authority, the new authority's war headquarters came to operate from a mountain facility in Mölndal. In Mölndal, the facility was shared with parts of the defence district staff, the county administrative board of Gothenburg and Bohus County and the air defence center Svalan (W2). With the amalgamation, operations at Nya Varvet gradually began to move to Käringberget. On 26 January 1986, the Swedish naval ensign was hoisted for the last time at Nya Varvet, and in October 1986, materiels management was organized at Käringberget. The naval port at Nya Varvet was moved to Tångudden.

=== Detachments ===
==== Munkedal ====
In 1962, a mountain facility in Munkedal was completed as a war headquarters to be used by the naval command. The naval command operated in the mountain facility together with Älvsborg Radio and the command of the 12th Coastal Artillery Group and an air surveillance group center. After the staff was moved to Gothenburg in 1981, Älvsborg Radio also left the facility in 1987.

==== Skredsvik ====
From 1 January 1953, the then West Coast Naval District had the naval base Gullmars Base in Skredsvik, where, among other things, the 6th Minehunter Department was based. After the West Coast Naval Command was disbanded, the base and detachment were transferred to the 4th Naval Warfare Flotilla.

==== Säve ====
In connection with the Riksdag deciding that the Göta Wing would be disbanded on 30 June 1969, it was also decided that the 2nd Helicopter Division (2. helikopterdivisionen) would take over parts of the wing's area at Säve Airbase. At the same time, the Recruiting Area Office, West (Västra värnpliktskontoret) was located at Säve. The helicopter division at Säve was transferred organizationally on 1 January 1999 to the Swedish Armed Forces Helicopter Wing, where it, together with the 13th Helicopter Division (13. helikopterdivisionen) and three air rescue groups from the Swedish Air Force, formed the Göta Helicopter Battalion (Göta helikopterbataljon).

== Heraldry and traditions ==
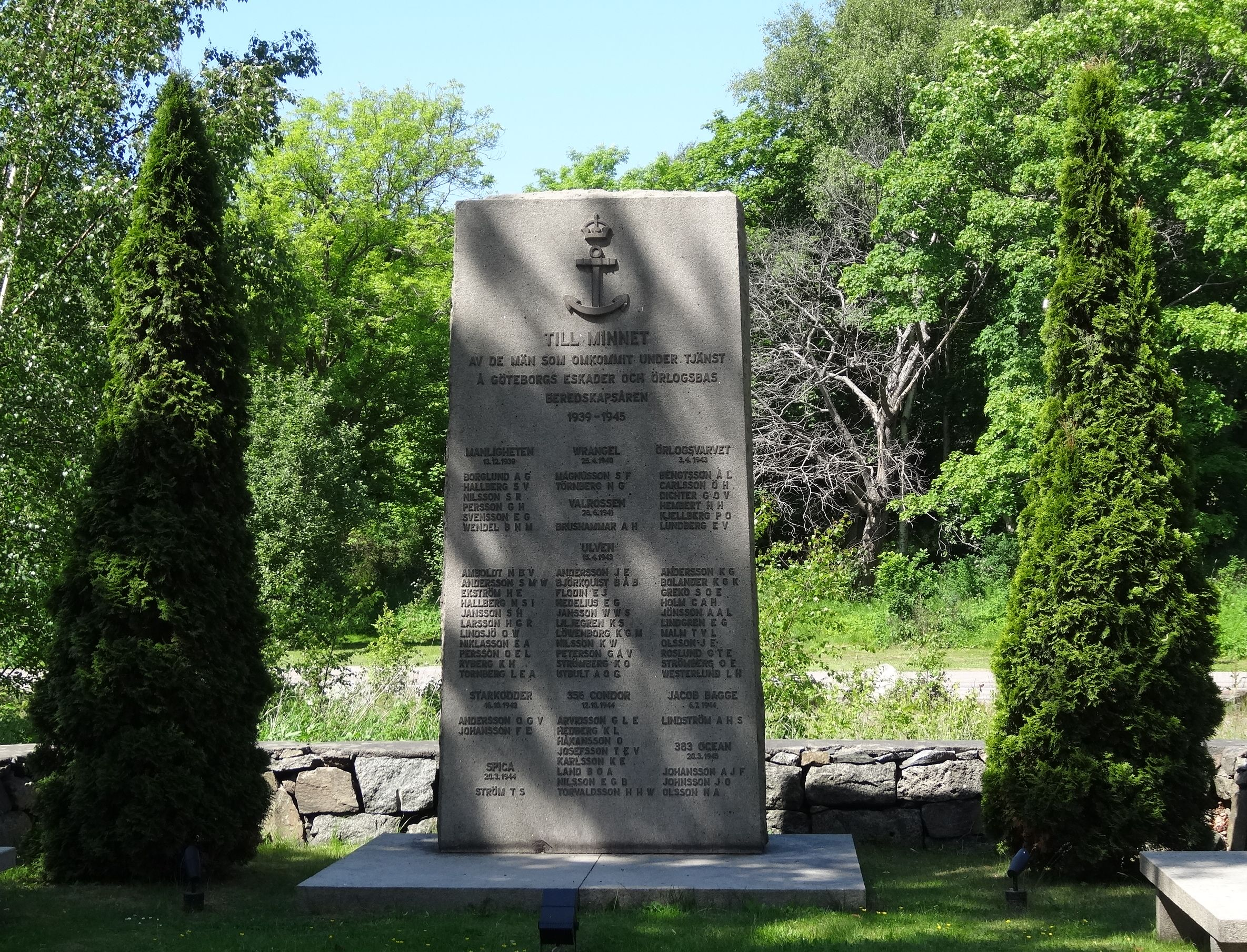
Monument at Nya Varvet's cemetery.

=== Anniversaries ===
The West Coast Naval Command celebrated several dates, including 15 April, 6 June, and 14 November. The 15 April was commemorated for the dead crew of the submarine HSwMS Ulven. The memorial service was held annually until 1986, thereafter every five years. The West Coast Naval Command commemorated the sinking for the last time in 1998. On 6 June, the victims of the naval war were honored at Sjömanstorget, a tradition taken over by the Seamen's Church in Gothenburg. On 14 November, a wreath-laying ceremony was held at Kviberg's cemetery where the war victims from the Battle of Jutland were honored.

=== Coat of arms ===
The unit coat of the arms was used by the West Coast Naval Base from 1966 to 1981 and by the West Coast Naval Command from 1981 to 2000. Blazon: "Per pale azure and or charged with an anchor erect surmounted two gunbarrels of older pattern in saltire counterchanged".

=== Medals ===
In 2000, the Västra marinkommandots (MKV) minnesmedalj (MKVMM) ("West Coast Naval Command Commemorative Medal") was established. It consists of a Maltese cross of blue enamel. The medal ribbon is of green moiré with broad blue edges followed by a broad yellow stripe.

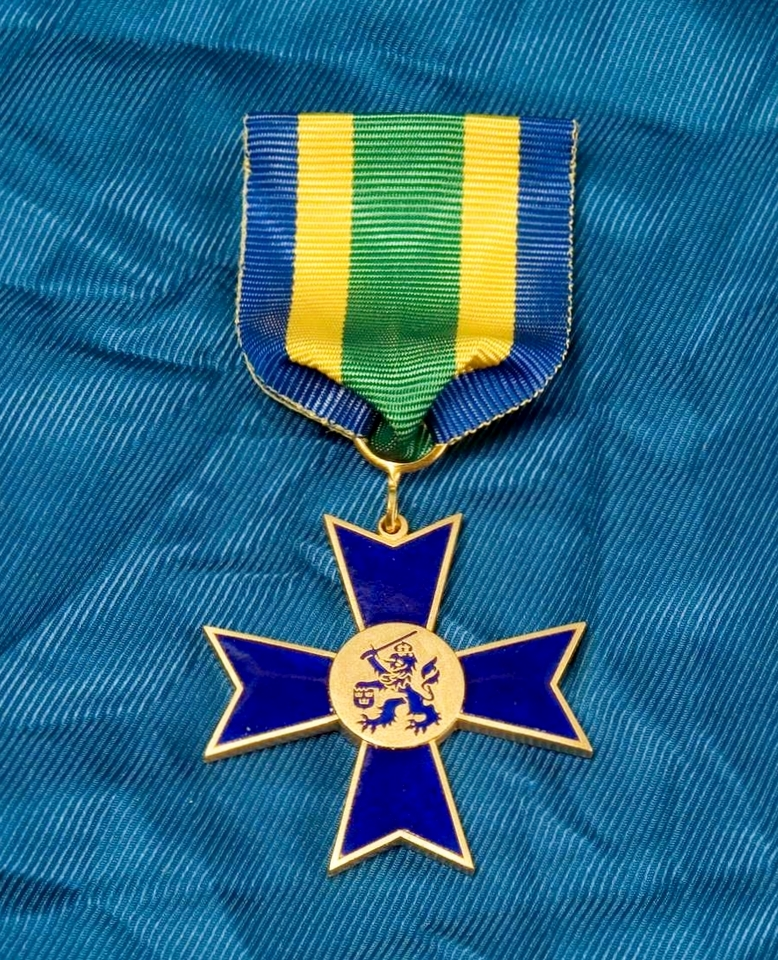
West Coast Naval Command Commemorative Medal

=== Heritage ===
The traditions of the East Coast Naval Base and its predecessors are kept by the Naval Base.

== Commanding officers ==
=== Commanders ===
From 1981, the unit commander also held the role of Defence District Commander. In the years 2000–2001, the commander held only responsibility for the decommissioning organization, and no operational or territorial responsibility.

- 1934–1939: Captain Gunnar Blix
- 1939–1939: Captain Gösta Lindström
- 1939–1942: Vice admiral Harald Åkermark
- 1942–1946: Captain Elis Biörklund
- 1946–1950: Captain Alarik Wachtmeister
- 1950–1954: Rear admiral Eskil Gester
- 1954–1957: Rear admiral Moje Östberg
- 1957–1964: Rear admiral Gunnar Fogelberg
- 1964–1967: Rear admiral Hans C:son Uggla
- 1967–1972: Captain Nils Arnell
- 1972–1976: Senior captain Harry Engblom
- 1976–1980: Senior captain Hans Hallerdt
- 1981–1983: Rear admiral Bengt Rasin
- 1983–1984: Senior colonel Thorbjörn Ottosson
- 1984–1989: Senior colonel Svante Kristensson
- 1989–1991: Senior captain Bertil Daggfeldt
- 1992–1992: Colonel Nils Eklund
- 1992–1995: Senior captain Carl-Gustaf Hammarskjöld
- 1995–1997: Senior colonel Anders Hammarskjöld
- 1997–2000: Senior captain Nils-Ove Jansson
- 2000–2001: ?

=== Deputy commanders ===
The position of deputy commander was introduced in 1981 in connection with the formation of the West Coast Military Command.

- 1981–1983: Senior colonel Thorbjörn Ottosson
- 1983–1985: Captain Carl-Gustaf Hammarskjöld
- 1985–1987: Captain Per Larsson
- 1987–1991: Captain Lars Norrsell
- 1991–1995: Colonel Nils Eklund
- 1995–1997: Senior captain Nils-Ove Jansson
- 1997–1998: Vacant
- 1998–2000: Colonel Lennart Klevensparr

== Names, designations and locations ==
Name	Translation	From		To
Västkustens marindistrikt	West Coast Naval District	1928-01-01	–	1957-09-30
Marinkommando Väst	Naval Command West	1957-10-01	–	1966-09-30
Västkustens örlogsbas	West Coast Naval Base	1966-10-01	–	1980-12-31
Västkustens militärkommando med Älvsborgs kustartilleriregemente	West Coast Military Command and Älvsborg Coastal Artillery Regiment	1981-01-01	–	1986-06-30
Västkustens marinkommando	West Coast Naval Command	1986-07-01	–	1997-12-31
Västkustens marinkommando och Västra Götalands försvarsområde	West Coast Naval Command and Västra Götland Defence District	1998-01-01	–	2000-06-30
Avvecklingsorganisation Göteborg	Decommissioning Organization Gothenburg	2000-07-01	–	2001-03-31
Designation		From		To
MDV		1928-01-01	–	1957-09-30
MKV		1957-10-01	–	1966-09-30
ÖrlB V		1966-10-01	–	1980-12-31
MKV/KA 4		1981-01-01	–	1986-06-30
MKV		1986-07-01	–	1997-12-31
MKV/Fo 32		1998-01-01	–	2000-06-30
Ao MKV/Fo 32		2000-07-01	–	2001-03-31
Location		From		To
Nya Varvet		1928-01-01	–	1986-01-27
Käringberget		1981-01-28	–	2001-03-31
