= Gothenburg Coastal Artillery Defence =

- Göteborgs kustartilleriförsvar
- Active: 1942–1980
- Country: Sweden
- Allegiance: Swedish Armed Forces
- Branch: Swedish Navy
- Type: Coastal artillery defence
- Role: Operational, territorial and tactical activities
- Size: Staff
- Part of: MDV (1942–1957); MKV (1957–1966); Milo V (1966–1980)
- Garrison/HQ: Gothenburg

Insignia
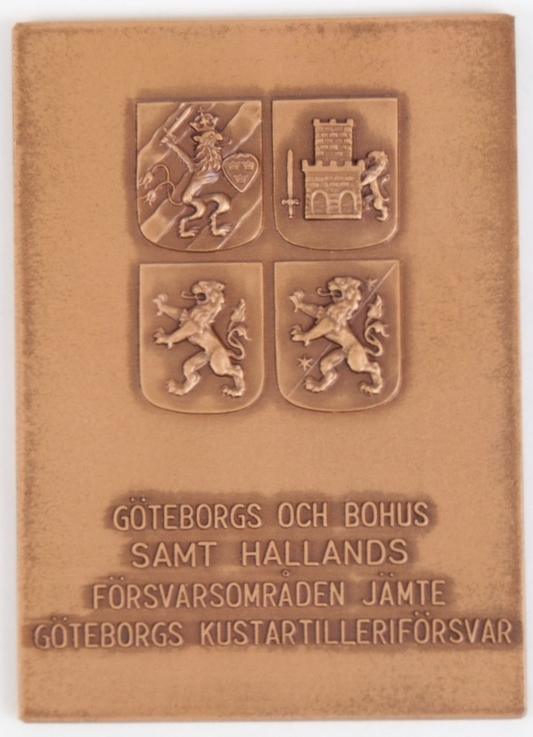
- Bronze plaque

Gothenburg Coastal Artillery Defence (Swedish: Göteborgs kustartilleriförsvar, GbK) was a unit of the Swedish Coastal Artillery which operated from 1942 to 1980. The staff was located in the Gothenburg Garrison in Gothenburg, Sweden.

The Gothenburg Coastal Artillery Defence was a naval authority responsible for mobilizing and commanding coastal artillery units in the Gothenburg archipelago. Gothenburg Coastal Artillery Defence was commanded by a Coastal Artillery Defence Commander, who also served as Defence District Commander, who in this capacity was the territorial commander. As Defence District Commander, the Coastal Artillery Defence Commander had the same responsibilities and obedience conditions as Defence District Commanders of the Swedish Army. In these cases, staff and command of the coastal artillery defence and the defence district were joint.

== History ==
Through the Defence Act of 1942, the Swedish Coastal Artillery went from fortress-based defence to coastal-based defence. Thus, the concept of fortress was removed from the peace and war organization. On 1 October 1942, coastal artillery defence staffs with associated geographical coastal areas were formed, which corresponded to a naval district. The coastal artillery defence staffs were organizationally subordinate to a naval district, but had in principle the same special position as the army defence district staffs. Within the West Coast Naval District, the Gothenburg Coastal Artillery Defence was formed by Älvsborg Fortress and the Gothenburg Archipelago Defence District (Göteborgs skärgårds försvarsområde, Fo 33). On 1 October 1957, the West Coast Naval District was reorganized into Naval Command West, where Gothenburg Coastal Artillery Defence was separated to form its own authority on 1 July 1958. The Gothenburg Coastal Artillery Defence itself was amalgamated on 1 October 1958 with the Gothenburg and Bohus as well as Halland Defence District (Fo 32/31) and adopted the name Gothenburg and Bohus as well as Halland Defence District together with Gothenburg Coastal Artillery Defence (Göteborgs kustartilleriförsvar jämte Göteborgs och Bohus försvarsområde, Gbk/Fo 32/31).

On 1 October 1966, a new regional command was introduced in the Swedish Armed Forces. As a result, the Gothenburg Coastal Artillery Defence was directly subordinated to the military commander of the Western Military District, from previously being directly subordinate to Naval Command West.

Prior to the so-called OLLI reform (OLLI-reformen), which was carried out within the Swedish Armed Forces between 1973 and 1975, the Supreme Commander in 1974 proposed that Halland Defence District (Hallands försvarsområde, Fo 31) should be separated from Gothenburg and Bohus and Halland Defence District, to be commanded by Halland Regiment instead. From 1 July 1975, the new name Gothenburg Coastal Artillery Defence was adopted, along with the Gothenburg and Bohus Defence District. The new unit had the overall administrative and mobilization responsibility for Gothenburg and Bohuslän, with the exception of northern Bohuslän, where Bohuslän Regiment accounted for the professional mobilization responsibility for the infantry brigades trained by the regiment.

Prior to the Government Bill 1978/79:96, the Swedish government proposed to Parliament that the three authorities of the West Coast Naval Base, Gothenburg Coast Artillery Defence with Gothenburg and Bohus Defence District (GbK/Fo 32) and Älvsborg Coastal Artillery Regiment (KA 4) be amalgamated into one authority in the peace organization. The background to the proposal of a amalgamation was due to savings reasons, where the Swedish Armed Forces and the government considered that the naval operations on the Swedish west coast could be coordinated under a joint command. On 15 February 1979, the Parliament adopted the Government Bill, which resulted in the three units being amalgamated on 1 January 1981, forming the West Coast Military Command. The Gothenburg Coastal Artillery Defence was disbanded on 31 December 1980.

== Units ==
=== Gothenburg and Bohus as well as Halland Defence District ===
The Gothenburg and Bohus as well as Halland Defence District (Fo 32) was formed in 1939 as the Gothenburg Defence District and had its staff initially located in central Gothenburg. From 1958 the staff was co-located with the Gothenburg Coastal Artillery Defence (GbK). In connection with the OLLI reform, on 1 July 1975, the defence district, which was now called Gothenburg and Bohus Defence District (Fo 32), was amalgamated and gained joint staff of the Gothenburg Coastal Artillery Defence. The staff had several different addresses in central Gothenburg. Among other things, at Södra Hamngatan 27, where the staff operated until 1966. The defence district was on 1 July 1981 amalgamated into the West Coast Military Command.

=== Halland Defence District ===
Halland Defence District (Hallands försvarsområde, Fo 31) was formed on 1 October 1942. From 1 January 1947, the staff was relocated from Halmstad to Gothenburg, where it was co-located with the staff of Gothenburg and Bohus Defence District on Södra Hamngatan 27 and from 1949 on Västra Hamngatan 13. However, some of the staff remained in Halmstad on Badhusgatan 10. On 1 July 1975, the staff returned to Halmstad completely and were simultaneously included in the Halland Regiment.

=== Älvsborg Coastal Artillery Regiment ===
The Älvsborg Coastal Artillery Regiment (KA 4) was raised in 1942 and was part of Gothenburg Coastal Artillery Defence. In 1958, the regiment got its own commanding officer. In connection with the disbandment of Gothenburg Coastal Artillery Defence, the Älvsborg Coastal Artillery Regiment transitioned to a training unit within the West Coast Military Command.

== Locations ==
From 1942 to 1948, a barracks establishment was erected on Västraberget in Västra Frölunda for the coastal artillery. In total, some 80 buildings were erected in the area. The establishment is today the only remaining military area in Gothenburg urban area. Since 2005, various detachments from other units and the Swedish Armed Forces Centre for Defence Medicine have been located here.

== Commanding officers ==
The unit commander was referred to as Kustartilleriförsvarschef ("Coastal Artillery Defence Commander") and also held the Defence District Commander position from 1958 to 1980.

- 1942–1946: Colonel Rudolf Kolmodin
- 1946–1954: Colonel Harald Callerström
- 1954–1957: Colonel Sven Haglund
- 1957–1961: Colonel Henrik Lange
- 1961–1969: Senior Colonel Birger Björnsson
- 1969–1977: Senior Colonel Per Carleson
- 1977–1980: Senior Colonel Kjell Werner

== Names, designations and locations ==
| Name | Translation | From | | To |
|---|---|---|---|---|
| Göteborgs kustartilleriförsvar | Gothenburg Coastal Artillery Defence | 1942-07-01 | – | 1958-09-30 |
| Göteborgs och Bohus samt Hallands försvarsområde jämte Göteborgs kustartilleriförsvar | Gothenburg and Bohus as well as Halland Defence District together with Gothenburg Coastal Artillery Defence | 1958-10-01 | – | 1975-06-30 |
| Göteborgs kustartilleriförsvar jämte Göteborgs och Bohus försvarsområde | Gothenburg Coastal Artillery Defence together with Gothenburg and Bohus Defence District | 1975-07-01 | – | 1980-12-31 |
| Designation | | From | | To |
| GbK | | 1942-07-01 | – | 1958-09-30 |
| GbK/Fo 32/Fo 31 | | 1958-10-01 | – | 1975-06-30 |
| GbK/Fo 32 | | 1975-07-01 | – | 1980-12-31 |
| Location | | From | | To |
| Gothenburg Garrison | | 1942-07-01 | – | 1980-12-31 |
