= Västra Götaland Defence District =

- Västra Götalands försvarsområde
- Active: 1939–2000
- Country: Sweden
- Allegiance: Swedish Armed Forces
- Branch: Swedish Army (Note: However, the staff was subordinate to a unit in the Swedish Navy.)
- Type: Defence district
- Part of: III. Milo (1942–1958); GbK (1958–1980); MKV (1981–1986); MKV (1986–2000)
- Garrison/HQ: Gothenburg

Västra Götaland Defence District (Swedish: Västra Götalands försvarsområde, Fo 32) was a Swedish defence district which operated in from 1939 to 2000. Its staff was located in Gothenburg Garrison in Gothenburg, Sweden.

== History ==
Västra Götaland Defence District was formed on 3 September 1939 as Gothenburg Defence District (Göteborgs försvarsområde). It included in the 1943 War Organization the southern part of Älvsborg County along the southern boundary of Flundre-Bjärke police superintendent (landsfiskal) districts, City of Kungsbacka (Kungsbacka stad) and Viske and Kungsbacka police superintendent district of Halland County as well as City of Gothenburg, City of Mölndal and City of Kungälv as well as Sävedal, Fässberg, Askim, Hising, Kungälv, Stenungsund and Tjörn police superintendent districts of Gothenburg and Bohus County, except in the Gothenburg Archipelago Defence District (Göteborgs skärgårds försvarsområde, Fo 33) included parts (SFS 1943:33). The staff was located in Gothenburg. From 1947, Gothenburg Defence District amalgamated with Halmstad Defence District (Halmstads försvarsområde, Fo 31) which formed Gothenburg-Halmstad Defence District (Göteborgs-Halmstads försvarsområde, Fo 31).

The defence district was directly subordinate to the military commander of the III Military District. From 1 January 1947, the defence district gained a joint staff with Halmstad Defence District (Halmstads försvarsområde, Fo 32). On 1 October 1957, the West Coast Naval District (MDV) was reorganized into Naval Command West (MKV), which meant that Gothenburg Coastal Artillery Defence was separated because on 1 July 1958, it formed its own authority. At the same time the Gothenburg Archipelago Defence District (Fo 33), Gothenburg Defence District (Fo 32) and the Halmstad Defence District (Fo 31) was amalgamated into the Gothenburg Coastal Artillery Defence, which adopted the name Gothenburg and Bohus as well as Halland Defence District together with Gothenburg Coastal Artillery Defence (Gbk/Fo 32/31).

Prior to the so-called OLLI reform (OLLI-reformen), which was carried out within the Swedish Armed Forces from 1973 to 1975, the Supreme Commander in 1974 proposed that Halmstad Defence District should be separated from Gothenburg and Bohus as well as Halland Defence District, to be commanded instead from Halland Regiment (I 16). From 1 July 1975, the new name Gothenburg Coastal Artillery Defence along with the Gothenburg and Bohus Defence District. The new unit had the overall administrative and mobilization responsibility for Gothenburg and Bohuslän, with the exception of northern Bohuslän, where Bohuslän Regiment accounted for the professional mobilization responsibility for the infantry brigades trained by the regiment.

Prior to the Government Bill 1978/79:96, the Swedish government proposed to Parliament that the three authorities of the West Coast Naval Base, Gothenburg Coastal Artillery Defence with Gothenburg and Bohus Defence District (GbK/Fo 32) and Älvsborg Coastal Artillery Regiment (KA 4) be amalgamated into one authority in the Peace Organization. The background to the proposal of an amalgamation was due to savings reasons, where the Swedish Armed Forces and the government considered that the naval operations on the Swedish west coast could be coordinated under a joint command. On 15 February 1979, the Parliament adopted the Government Bill. On 1 January 1981, the new organization came into force, under the name of the West Coast Military Command with Älvsborg Coastal Artillery Regiment (MKV/KA 4), which also commanded the defence district. On 1 July 1986, the command adopted the new name of the West Coast Naval Command.

Prior to the Defence Act of 1996, Stage 2, the Swedish government proposed to Parliament to reduce the number of defence district staffs from 24 to 16 staffs. Among other things, it was proposed that Älvsborg Defence District (Älvsborgs försvarsområde, Fo 34) with staff in Borås be disbanded. In the Government's Budget Bill 1997/98:1, the government also proposed that Skaraborg Defence District (Skaraborgs försvarsområde, Fo 35) with staff in Skövde be disbanded. This with the background that Västra Götaland County would thus form a defence district with defence district staff in Gothenburg at the West Coast Naval Command. Instead of the two former defence district staffs in Borås and Skövde, the Skaraborgsgruppen and Älvsborgsgruppen were formed. As a further decision in the Defence Act of 1996, the Öresund Naval District (Öresunds marindistrikt, MDÖ) was also proposed to be amalgamated into the West Coast Naval Command. The new organization, which the Parliament adopted on two occasions, came into effect from 1 January 1998, when the West Coast Naval Command was given the somewhat unusual long name "West Coast Naval Command including the Öresund Naval District and the Västra Götaland Defence District (Västkustens marinkommando inklusive Öresunds marindistrikt samt Västra Götalands försvarsområde, MKV/Fo 32).

Prior to the Defence Act of 2000, in its bill for the Parliament, the Swedish government proposed that the tactical level should be reduced by disbanding division and defence district staffs as well as naval commands and air commands. This was to design an Army Tactical Command, Naval Tactical Command and Air Force Tactical Command which would be co-located with the operational command. The proposal meant that all defence district staffs would be disbanded, which included Västra Götaland Defence District.

== Location ==
When the defence district staff was formed, it was located to Östra Hamngatan 2 in Gothenburg. On 1 January 1946, the staff operated from Södra Hamngatan 27. From 1958, the staff had some operations located at Badhusgatan 10 in Halmstad and Norra Drottninggatan 21 in Uddevalla. From 13 December 1962, operations in Uddevalla were moved to Excercisvägen 1. From 18 January 1966, operations in Gothenburg were transferred to Nya Varvet and from 1981 to Kärringberget, where the staff worked until it the unit was disbanded.

== Commanding officers ==
The commanding officer was referred to as Defence District Commander and usually held the rank of senior colonel/senior captain.

- 1942–1952: ?
- 1952–1958: Colonel Gilbert Nordqvist
- 1958–1961: Colonel Henrik Lange
- 1961–1969: Senior colonel Birger Björnsson
- 1969–1977: Senior colonel Per Carleson
- 1977–1980: Senior colonel Kjell Werner
- 1981–1983: Rear Admiral Bengt Rasin
- 1983–1984: Senior colonel Thorbjörn Ottosson
- 1984–1989: Senior colonel Svante Kristensson
- 1989–1991: Senior captain Bertil Daggfeldt
- 1992–1992: Colonel Nils Eklund
- 1992–1995: Senior captain Carl-Gustaf Hammarskjöld
- 1995–1997: Senior colonel Anders Hammarskjöld
- 1997–2000: Senior captain Nils-Ove Jansson

== Names, designations and locations ==
Name	Translation	From		To
Göteborgs försvarsområde	Gothenburg Defence District	1939-09-03	–	1958-06-30
Göteborgs och Bohus samt Hallands försvarsområde	Gothenburg and Bohus as well as Halland Defence District	1958-07-01	–	1975-06-30
Göteborgs och Bohus försvarsområde	Gothenburg and Bohus Defence District	1975-07-01	–	1997-12-31
Västra Götalands försvarsområde	Västra Götaland Defence District	1998-01-01	–	2000-06-30
Designation		From		To
Fo 32		1942-10-01	–	1958-06-30
Fo 32/31		1958-07-01	–	1975-06-30
Fo 32		1975-07-01	–	2000-06-30
Location		From		To
Gothenburg Garrison		1942-10-01	–	2000-06-30
