= Älvsborg Coastal Artillery Regiment =

- Älvsborgs kustartilleriregemente
- Active: 1942–2000
- Country: Sweden
- Allegiance: Swedish Armed Forces
- Branch: Swedish Navy
- Type: Coastal artillery
- Size: Regiment
- Part of: GbK (1942–1958); MKV (1958–1966); Milo V (1966–1980); MKV (1981–1986); MKV (1986–1997); Milo S (1998–2000)
- Garrison/HQ: Gothenburg
- Colors: Blue, yellow and red
- March: "I beredskap" (Rydberg) (Note: The march was adopted in 1953 and established on 13 June 1996 through TFG 960005. The march was inherited by the 4th Marine Regiment.)

Insignia
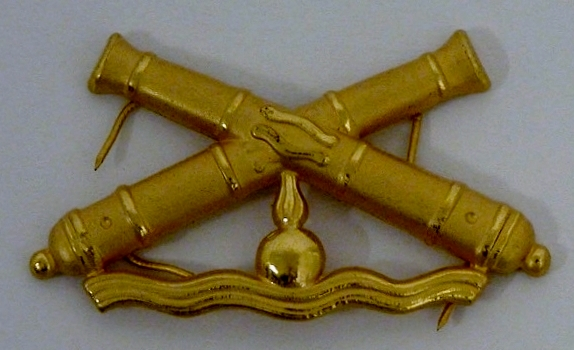
- Branch insignia

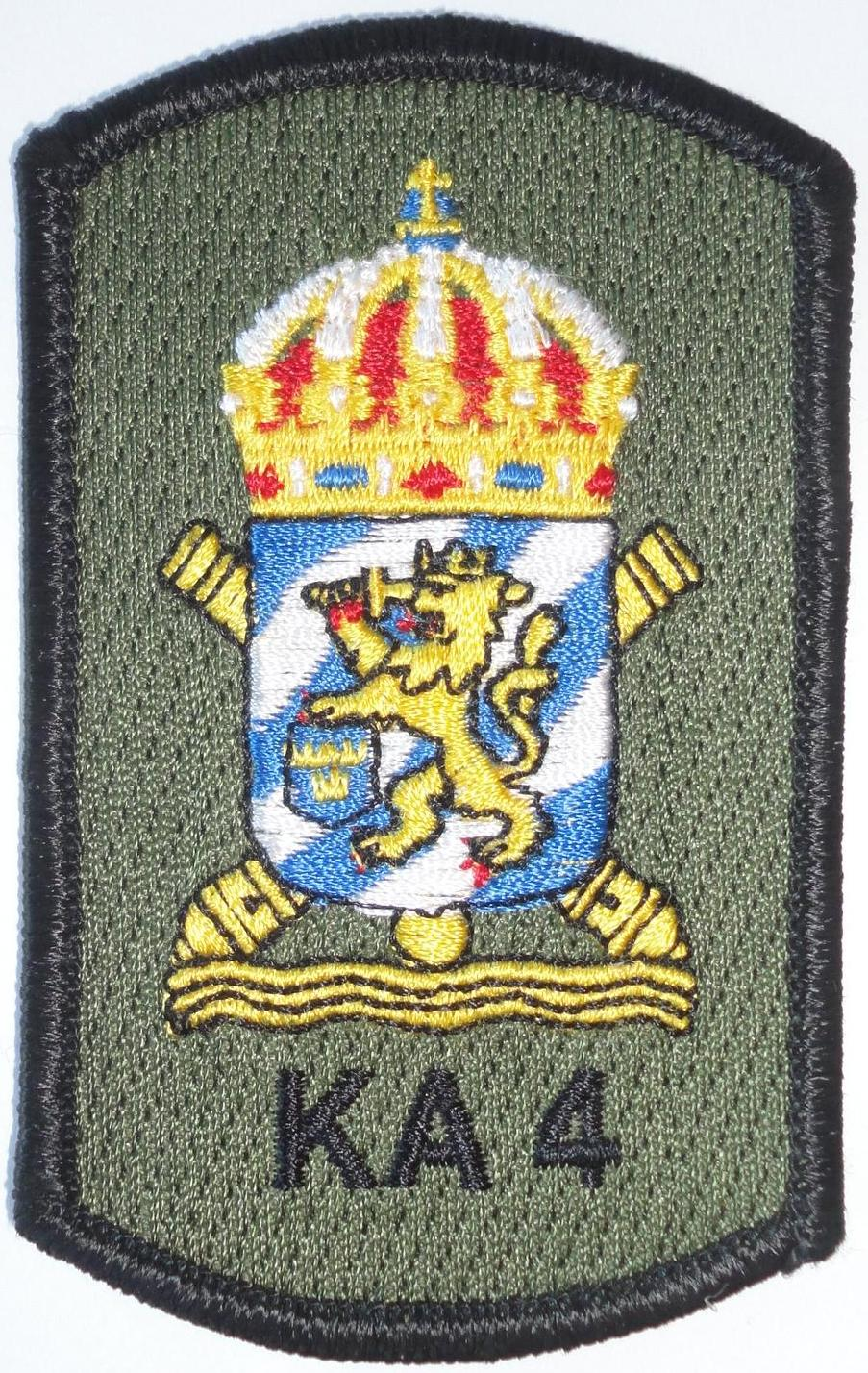
- Shoulder sleeve insignia

The Älvsborg Coastal Artillery Regiment (Swedish: Älvsborgs kustartilleriregemente), designation KA 4, was a Swedish Navy coastal artillery regiment of the Swedish Armed Forces which operated between 1942 and 2000. The unit was based in Gothenburg.

== History ==
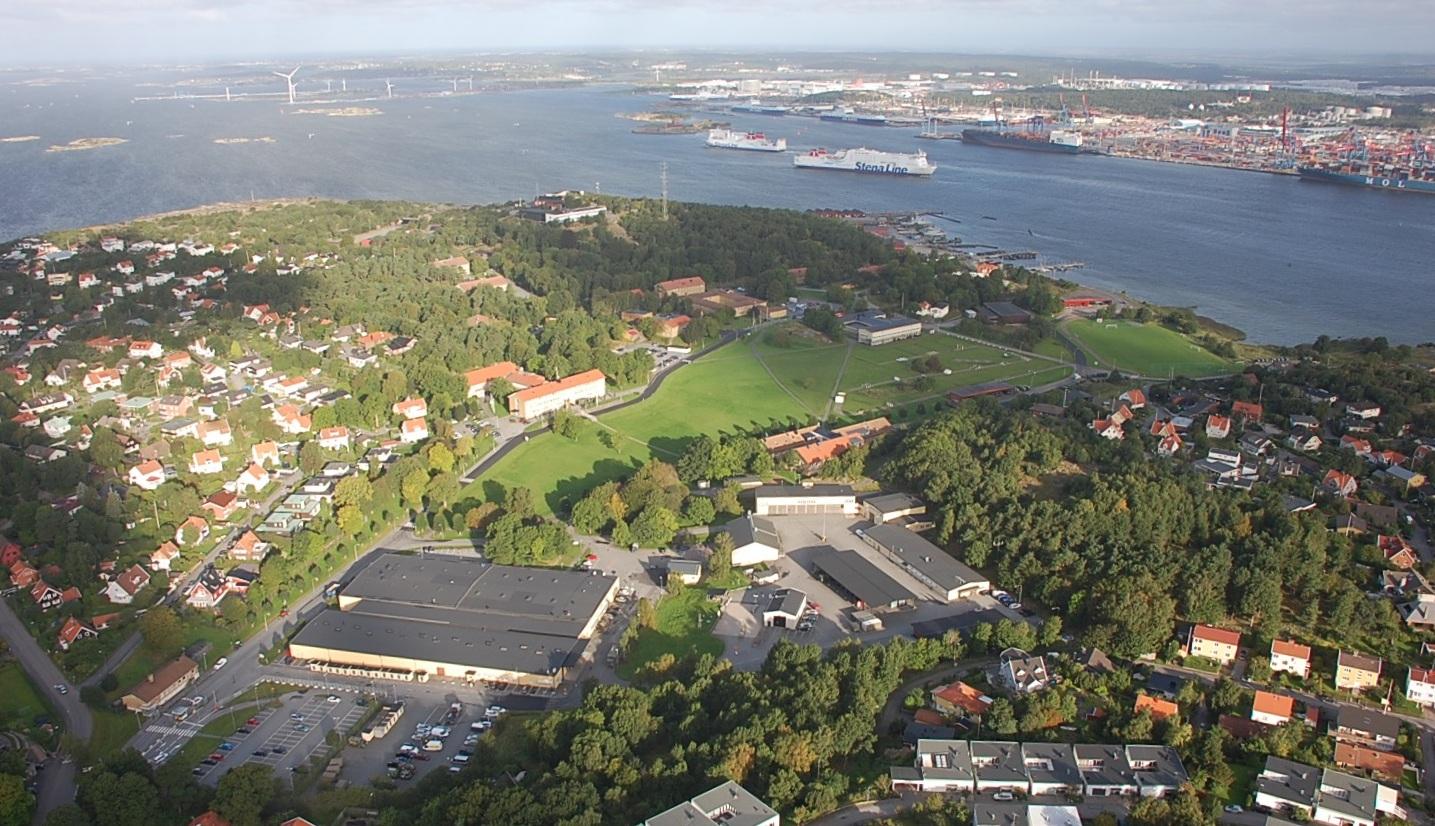
Barracks area of Älvsborg Coastal Artillery Regiment pictured in 2012.

After the Swedish Coastal Artillery was established in 1902, intended for manning the Sweden's coastal fortifications, it was decided that a detachment from the Karlskrona Coastal Artillery Regiment (KA 2) called Älvsborg Coastal Artillery Detachment, would be located in Gothenburg. The existing facilities at Nya Varvet were placed at the disposal of the coastal artillery. Thus, Gothenburg's coastal artillery had begun its existence. Over the years, many and major changes have occurred. Älvsborg Fortress, started in 1899 and completed in modern condition in 1907, was placed in a materiel reserve in 1926. On 1 January 1915, Älvsborg Coastal Artillery Detachment (KA 2 Ä) became Älvsborg Coastal Artillery Corps (KA 3). The corps was disbanded in 1926 and from 1 November 1926 until 1939, Gothenburg's coastal artillery consisted only of a small division from KA 2 in Karlskrona, which had the task of keeping the powder dry and rust away from the guns and mines at Älvsborg Fortress. In the face of the threatening foreign policy situation, the fortress was placed in a state of defence in the autumn of 1939. By then, the line of defence had already begun to be moved from the estuary to the outer islands of Gothenburg archipelago.

On 30 August 1939, Älvsborg' Coastal Artillery Detachment (KA 4) was raised within Älvsborg Fortress. KA 4 was created through the 1942 Defence Order (1942 års försvarsordning). Älvsborg Coastal Artillery Regiment (KA 4) in Gothenburg was established from 1 July 1942. Through the same Defence Act, Älvsborg Fortress was amalgamated into Gothenburg Coastal Artillery Defence (GbK). KA 4 was subordinated to Gothenburg Coastal Artillery Defence and the Coastal Artillery Defence Commander also became regimental commander. KA 4 began to be set up on 1 October 1942 with a first stage comprising three artillery companies, a signal company and yrkes (occupational) company. On 1 October 1944, the regiment was raised according to plan with nine companies: 1st Battalion: 1st and 2nd Company as a seafront artillery partly outside and partly within GbK. 2nd battalion: 11th Company as signal company, 12th Company as a naval mine company and 13th Company as yrkes company (not machinists and firemen, which was part of the 12th Company). In 1942, the island of Känsö was taken into use as an accommodation and training area. The new barracks establishment at Käringberget for KA 4 was completed in stages. The chancellery and two barracks were taken into use in 1944. Three barracks, a dining facility and an officer and non-commissioned officer mess were taken into use in 1945 and in 1948 the extension was completed in its entirety with offices, messes, kitchen, dining room, canteen, school premises, storage, etc. During the following years, many alterations and extensions took place within the barracks area, as well as the regiment's organization being changed partly in 1955 and partly in 1960 and to some extent in 1981.

In 1955, the regiment comprised the following units: a barrier battalion which included battalion staff, staff battery, a light and a medium battery, a naval mine battalion, which included battalion staff and a minelayer squadron, as well as a command school, instructor school, barracks battery and radar school. The 1960 organization included: regimental staff, a light battery with staff platoon, a minelayer squadron, command school, instructor school, radar school and barracks battery. In 1961, the Swedish Navy Medical School (Marinens sjukvårdsskola) was added. In 1981, the barracks battery in Baskompaniet ("Base Company"), and the instructor school ceased and the Swedish Navy Officer College in Gothenburg (Marinens officershögskola i Göteborg, MOHS G) was added. In 1981, 1,400 men belonging to the coastal artillery and 300 belonging to the navy were trained. The permanent staff in 1981 consisted of about 210 people, divided into military and civilian military personnel.

== Units ==
=== 5th Coastal Artillery Brigade ===
The 5th Coastal Artillery Brigade (5. kustartilleribrigaden, KAB 5) was raised in the early 1950s when the navy abandoned point and inlet defence to organize a surface defence instead. During the 1970s, the 5th Coastal Artillery Brigade included three barrier battalions and one barrier company. In addition to the 5th Coastal Artillery Brigade, the 12th Coastal Artillery Group with Lysekil barrier battalion was also included in Gothenburg Coastal Artillery Defence. In connection with the Defence Act of 1996, the 5th Coastal Artillery Brigade was removed from the war organization on 31 December 1997.

=== 5th Amphibian Battalion ===
The 5th Amphibian Battalion (5. amfibiebataljonen) was raised during 1994/1995 and consisted of a missile company, a mining company, a grenade launcher company and two coastal ranger companies as well as a maintenance company. The battalion was transferred on 1 July 2000 to the 4th Marine Regiment (Amf 4).

=== Naval Warrant Officers’ School ===
The Naval Warrant Officers’ School (Befälsskolan) was formed in 1956 and trained officers and reserve officer candidates and pluton leaders. In 1981, the school was disbanded when the officer training was transferred to the Coastal Artillery Officer's School (Kustartilleriets officersskola).

=== Instructor School ===
The Instructor School (Instruktörsskolan) was formed in 1955, and was a joint school for all of the Swedish Coastal Artillery. It trained platoon leaders in general educational subjects and in leadership. Later, the school also came to train students in general educational subjects from other branches of Swedish Armed Forces. Through the Government Bill 1979/80:7, the school was decommissioned in 1982, this in part through the Ny befälsordning ("New Command System") reform, with the background that officers who needed further training had to apply to the general school system.

=== Swedish Navy Officer College in Gothenburg ===
The Swedish Navy Officer College in Gothenburg (Marinens officershögskola i Göteborg, MOHS G) operated at KA 4 from 1981 to 1984, after which the school was amalgamated into the Swedish Navy Officer College in Karlskrona (Marinens officershögskola i Karlskrona, MOHS K), which adopted the name Swedish Navy Officer College (Marinens officershögskola, MOHS).

=== Swedish Navy Medical School ===
The Swedish Navy Medical School (Marinens sjukvårdsskola, MSjukvS) was formed in 1961 with the task of training medical commanders and conscripts within the Swedish Navy's war organization. Initially, the school's training was located in Hjuvik, but was relocated to Säve in 1969, after Göta Wing (F 9) was disbanded the same year. In 1992, parts of the school, together with the Radar School, were amalgamated into a newly established school battalion. The Swedish Navy Medical School was on 1 July 1994 amalgamated into the Medical Center of the Swedish Armed Forces (FSC).

=== Radar School ===
The Radar School (Radarskolan, RadarS) was formed in 1949 at the regiment's 9th Company, with training on reconnaissance and fire control radar. In 1992, the school was part of a newly established school battalion. Prior to the disbandment of KA 4, the school was part of Carlsten Company, which was a command and control company.

== Heraldry and traditions ==
=== Coat of arms ===
The coat of arms of the Älvsborg Coastal Artillery Regiment was used from 1942 to 1994 and by the Gothenburg Marine Brigade with Älvsborg Coastal Artillery Regiment (Göteborgs marinbrigad med Älvsborgs kustartilleriregemente, GMB) from 1994 to 2000. After the regiment was disbanded in 2000, the coat of arms was inherited by the 4th Marine Regiment (Amf 4). Blazon: "Azure, the regimental badge, three waves bendy-sinister argent, charged with a double-tailed crowned lion rampant or, armed and langued gules, in dexter forepaw a sword or and in sinister a shield azure charged with three open crowns or placed two and one. The shield surmounted two gunbarrels of older pattern in saltire above a flaming grenade and waves".

=== Colours, standards and guidons ===
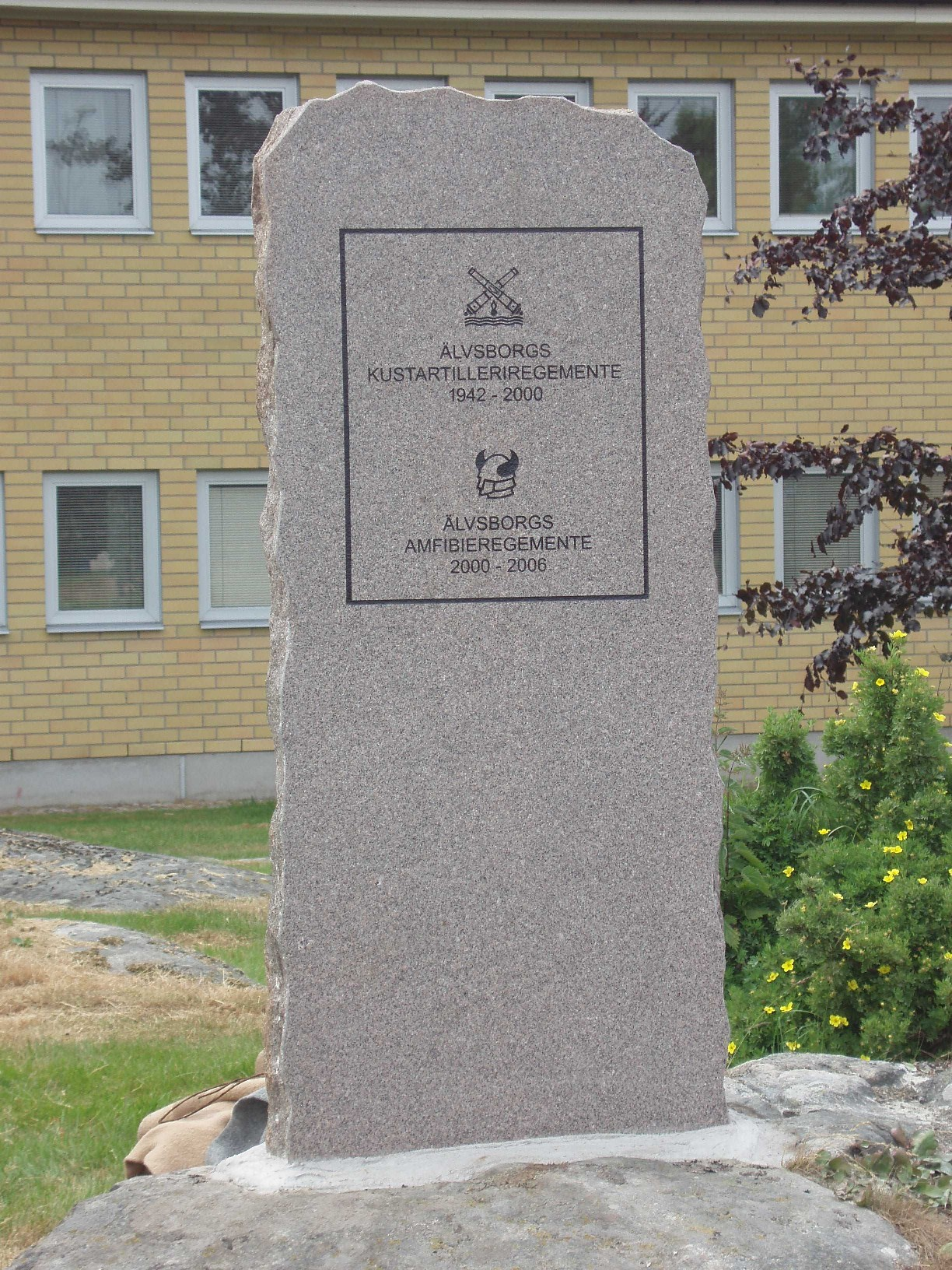
Memorial stone of KA 4 and Amf 4

The units first regimental colour was presented to the Älvsborg Coastal Artillery Regiment (KA 4) on 1 June 1945 by His Majesty the King Gustaf V at a ceremony at Stockholm Palace, to the then regimental commander Colonel Rudolf Kolmodin. The colour was shown to the regiment at a ceremony on 6 June 1945, i.e. at that year's Swedish Flag Day.

A new regimental colour was presented to the Älvsborg Coastal Artillery Regiment (KA 4) at the Artillery Yard in Stockholm by the Chief of the Navy Staff, Vice Admiral Peter Nordbeck on 17 June 1995. The colour is drawn by Vladimir Sagerlund and embroidered by machine in appliqué technique by Engelbrektssons Flag factory. Blazon: "On red cloth in the centre the badge of the Swedish Coastal Artillery; two gunbarrels of older pattern in saltire between a royal crown proper and a blazing grenade and waves, all in yellow. In the first corner the badge of the regiment; a crowned yellow lion rampant, in the right forepaw a yellow sword and in the left a blue shield with three yellow crowns placed two and one." After the regiment was disbanded in 2000, the colour was inherited by the 4th Marine Regiment (Amf 4).

At a simple ceremony on 5 September 2005 the commander of the 4th Marine Regiment, Colonel Stefan Gustafsson, handed the colour to the commander of the 1st Marine Regiment, Colonel Lars-Olof Corneliusson, who commanded the colour to be carried by the amphibious detachment in Gothenburg.

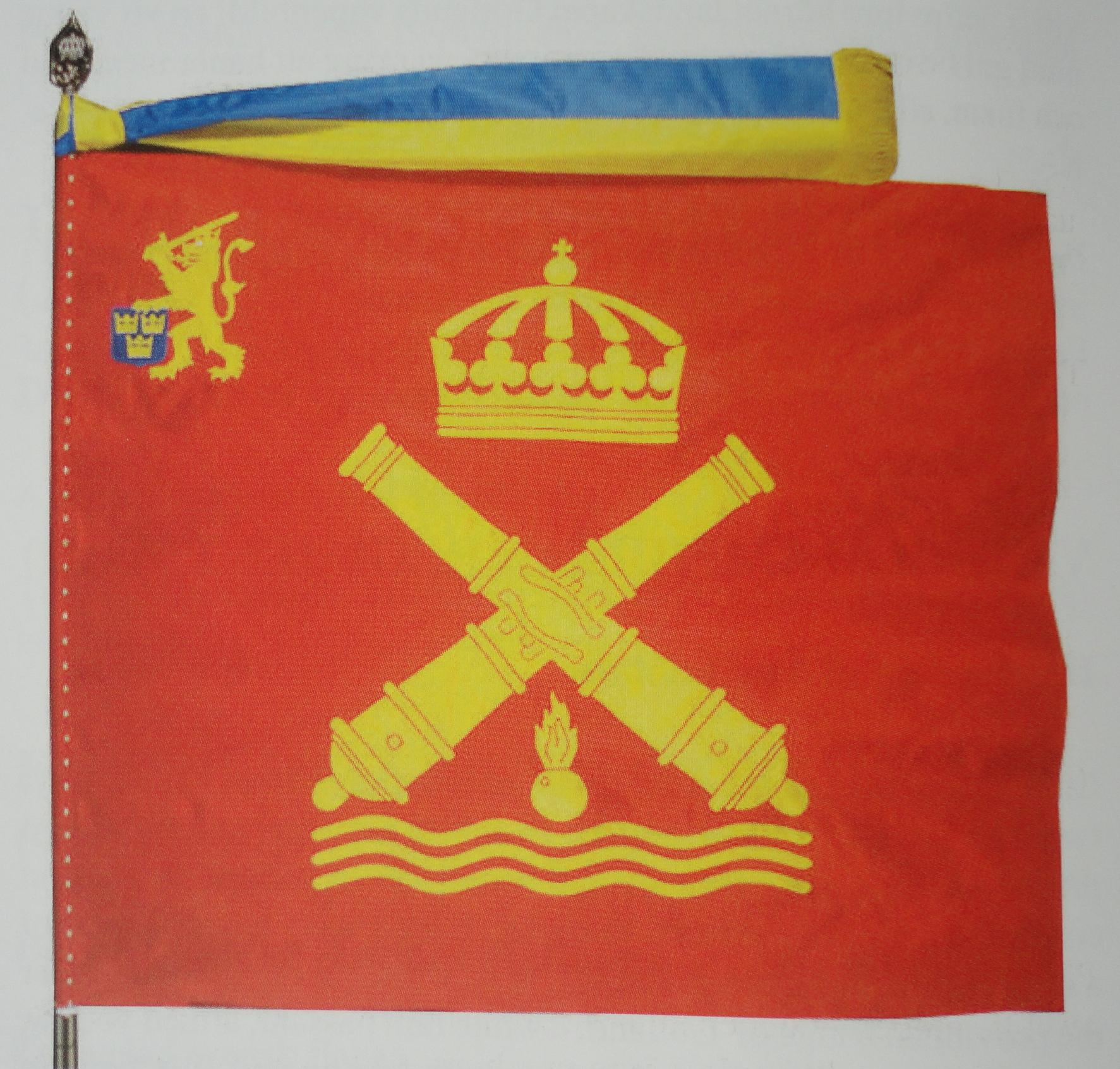
The 1995 regimental colour.

=== Medals ===
The medal called Älvsborgs kustartilleriregementes (KA 4) förtjänstmedalj ("Älvsborg Coastal Artillery Regiment (KA 4) Medal of Merit") in gold (ÄlvsbkaregGM) was in 2001 changed to the Älvsborgs amfibieregementes (Amf 4) förtjänstmedalj ("Älvsborg Amphibious Regiment (Amf 4) Medal of Merit") in gold and silver (ÄlvsbamfregGM/SM). It's a cross bottony of gold and red enamel. The medal ribbon is divided in blue, red and blue moiré with a yellow line in the middle of the blue fields.

== Commanding officers ==
- 1942–1946: Colonel Rudolf Kolmodin
- 1946–1954: Colonel Harald Callerström
- 1954–1957: Colonel Sven Haglund
- 1957–1958: Colonel Henrik Lange
- 1958–1969: Colonel Sixten Gråberg
- 1969–1977: Colonel Kjell Werner
- 1978–1981: Colonel Lars Ahlström
- 1981–1984: Colonel Svante Kristenson
- 1984–1989: Lieutenant Colonel mst Sven Robertsson
- 1989–1992: Lieutenant Colonel Jack Wibring
- 1992–1992: Lieutenant Colonel Lars Leffler
- 1992–1996: Lieutenant Colonel mst Sigvard Oscarsson
- 1996–1998: Lieutenant Colonel mst Bo Andersson
- 1998–2000: Colonel Bengt Delang

== Names, designations and locations ==
Name	Translation	From		To
Karlskrona kustartilleriregementes detachemant	Karlskrona Coastal Artillery Regiment's Detachment	1902-01-01	–	1914-12-31
Älvsborgs kustartillerikår	Älvsborg Coastal Artillery Corps	1915-01-01	–	1926-10-31
Älvsborgs kustartilleriregemente	Älvsborg Coastal Artillery Regiment	1942-10-01	–	1957-09-30
Göteborgs kustartilleriförsvar med Älvsborgs kustartilleriregemente	Gothenburg Coastal Artillery Defence with Älvsborg Coastal Artillery Regiment	1957-10-01	–	1980-12-31
Västkustens militärkommando med Älvsborgs kustartilleriregemente	West Coast Naval Command with Älvsborg Coastal Artillery Regiment	1981-01-01	–	1986-06-30
Göteborgs marinbrigad med Älvsborgs kustartilleriregemente	Gothenburg Marine Brigade with Älvsborg Coastal Artillery Regiment	1994-07-01	–	1997-12-31
Älvsborgs kustartilleriregemente	Älvsborg Coastal Artillery Regiment	1998-01-01	–	2000-06-30
Designation		From		To
KA 2 Ä		1902-01-01	–	1914-12-31
KA 3		1915-01-01	–	1926-10-31
GbK/KA 4		1942-10-01	–	1980-12-31
MKV/KA 4		1981-01-01	–	1994-06-30
GMB		1994-07-01	–	1997-12-31
KA 4		1998-01-01	–	2000-06-30
Location		From		To
Älvsborg, Gothenburg Garrison		1942-10-01	–	2000-06-30

== See also ==
- Älvsborg Amphibian Regiment
- List of Swedish coastal artillery regiments
