= Defence district =

Military subdivision of Swedish Armed Forces

Map of defence districts in 1943.

A defence district (Swedish: Försvarsområde, Fo) was a military subdivision of the Swedish Armed Forces created in 1914. It was a lower regional level subdivision, usually corresponding to a Swedish county. The commander of a defence district was the Defence District Commander, who usually commanded local defence units, including infantry, engineers, air defence and light artillery, as well as any Home Guard units in the district. The commander answered to the larger military district that the defence district was part of.

== History ==
A defence district was the lowest regional unit in the Swedish Armed Forces. Such were found in particularly important coastal areas during World War I and from 1939 on at a time of mobilization. From 1943 they were included as part of the ordinary peace organization. The district was responsible for defence planning, home defence, supervision of fixed facilities, certain territorial units and the Home Guard equipment and equipment. In 1973–76, the defence districts were amalgamated with regiments into defence district regiments (försvarsområdesregementen) (except Fo 67, which remained independent), but in the early 1990s some independent defence districts again were formed. These latter districts were disbanded as a result of the Defence Act of 1996. The locations of the defence districts are often indicated by their names. A defence district has usually been matched by a Swedish county except in Norrbotten where there were three defence districts.

== List ==
=== 1914–1918 ===
- Gävleborg Defence District
- Northern Uppland Defence District (Norra Upplands försvarsområde)
- Norrbotten Defence District
- Norrköping Defence District

=== 1939–1942 ===
- Ystad Defence District
- Malmö Defence District
- Kristianstad Defence District
- Helsingborg Defence District
- Hässleholm Defence District (1939–1942), amalgamated into Kristianstad Defence District
- Karlshamn Defence District
- Kronoberg Defence District (1939–1940), succeeded by Älmhult Defence District
- Älmhult Defence District (1940–1942), succeeded by Växjö Defence District
- Eksjö Defence District (1939–1940), succeeded by Nässjö Defence District
- Nässjö Defence District (1940–1942), succeeded by Jönköping Defence District
- Jönköping Defence District (1942–)
- Kalmar Defence District
- Gävle Defence District
- Härnösand Defence District
- Västernorrland Defence District (1939–1940), succeeded by Sollefteå Defence District
- Sollefteå Defence District (1940–1942), amalgamated into Härnösand Defence District
- Sundsvall Defence District (1940–1942), amalgamated into Härnösand Defence District
- Örnsköldsvik Defence District (1940–1942), amalgamated into Härnösand Defence District
- Östersund Defence District
- Borås Defence District (1939–1942), split between Uddevalla and Gothenburg Defence Districts
- Gothenburg Defence District
- Halmstad Defence District
- Skövde Defence District
- Uddevalla Defence District
- Vänersborg Defence District (1939–1942), amalgamated into Uddevalla Defence District
- Linköping Defence District
- Northern Mälardalen Defence District (Mälardalens norra försvarsområde) (1939–1940), succeeded by Sala Defence District
- Sala Defence District (1940–1942), amalgamated into Uppsala Defence District
- Southern Mälardalen Defence District (Mälardalens södra försvarsområde) (1939–1940), succeeded by Nyköping Defence District
- Nyköping Defence District (1940–1942), succeeded by Strängnäs Defence District
- Northern Uppland Defence District (Norra Upplands försvarsområde) (1939–1940), succeeded by Norrtälje Defence District
- Norrtälje Defence District (1940–)
- Norrköping Defence District
- Stockholm Defence District
- Stockholm Archipelago Defence District (Stockholms skärgårds försvarsområde)
- Södertörn Defence District (1939–1940), amalgamated into Stockholm Archipelago Defence District (Stockholms skärgårds försvarsområde)
- Östhammar Defence District, amalgamated in 1943 into Norrtälje Defence District
- Karlstad Defence District
- Örebro Defence District
- Västerbotten Defence District (1939–1940), split into Vännäs and Skellefteå Defence Districts
- Northern Lappland Defence District (Lapplands norra försvarsområde) (1939–1940), succeeded by Gällivare Defence District
- Gällivare Defence District (1940–)
- Lappland Southern Defence District (Lapplands södra försvarsområde) (1939–1940), succeeded by Storuman Defence District
- Storuman Defence District (1940), amalgamated with Skellefteå and Vännäs Defence Districts into Storumans‑Vännäs‑Skellefteå Defence District
- Skellefteå Defence District (1940), see Storuman Defence District above
- Vännäs Defence District (1940), see Storuman Defence District above
- Storuman‑Vännäs‑Skellefteå Defence District (1940–1941), then again split into three parts
- Skellefteå Defence District (1941–1942), then amalgamated with Vännäs Defence District into Umeå Defence District
- Storuman Defence District (1941–)
- Vännäs Defence District (1941–1942), then amalgamated with Skellefteå Defence District into Umeå Defence District
- Luleå Defence District (1940–)
- Jokkmokk Defence District (1940–)

=== 1943– ===
The 1942 organization, which came into force in 1943:

- Fo 11: Malmö Defence District
- Fo 12: Ystad Defence District
- Fo 13: Helsingborg Defence District
- Fo 14: Kristianstad Defence District
- Fo 15: Blekinge Defence District (naval defence district)
- Fo 16: Växjö Defence District
- Fo 17: Jönköping Defence District
- Fo 18: Kalmar Defence District
- Fo 21: Gävle Defence District
- Fo 22: Östersund Defence District
- Fo 23: Härnösand Defence District
- Fo 24: Hemsö Defence District (naval defence district)
- Fo 31: Halmstad Defence District
- Fo 32: Gothenburg Defence District
- Fo 33: Gothenburg Archipelago Defence District (Göteborgs skärgårds försvarsområde) (naval defence district)
- Fo 34: Uddevalla Defence District
- Fo 35: Skövde Defence District
- Fo 41: Linköping Defence District
- Fo 42: Norrtälje Defence District
- Fo 43: Strängnäs Defence District
- Fo 44: Stockholm Defence District
- Fo 45: Norrtälje Defence District
- Fo 46: Stockholm Archipelago Defence District (Stockholms skärgårds försvarsområde) (naval defence district)
- Fo 47: Uppsala Defence District
- Fo 51: Örebro Defence District
- Fo 52: Karlstad Defence District
- Fo 53: Falu Defence District
- Fo 54: Mora Defence District
- Fo 61: Umeå Defence District
- Fo 62: Storuman Defence District
- Fo 63: Boden Defence District
- Fo 64: Luleå Defence District
- Fo 65: Jokkmokk Defence District
- Fo 66: Kiruna Defence District
- Fo 67: Morjärv Defence District

=== 1973/76– ===
Since a number of reorganizations took place after 1945, the situation is reported here when the new organization with the defence district regiments (försvarsområdesregementen) has been implemented. The brackets indicate to which regiment the defence district was linked. Situation after 1973-76's creation of the defence district regiments:

- Fo 11: Malmö Defence District (P 7)
- Fo 14: Kristianstad Defence District (P 6)
- Fo 15: Karlskrona Defence District (BK)
- Fo 16: Kronoberg Defence District (I 11)
- Fo 17: Jönköping Defence District (I 12)
- Fo 18: Kalmar Defence District (I 11)
- Fo 21: Gävleborg Defence District (I 14), designated as Fo 49 from 1966 to 1982
- Fo 22: Jämtland Defence District (I 5)
- Fo 23: Västernorrland Defence District (I 21)
- Fo 31: Halland Defence District (I 16)
- Fo 32: Gothenburg and Bohus Defence District (MKV)
- Fo 34: Älvsborg Defence District (I 15)
- Fo 35: Skaraborg Defence District (P 4)
- Fo 41: Östergötland Defence District (I 4)
- Fo 43: Södermanland Defence District (P 10)
- Fo 44: Stockholm Defence District (K 1)
- Fo 47: Uppsala Defence District (S 1)
- Fo 48: Västmanland Defence District (S 1)
- Fo 51: Örebro Defence District (I 3)
- Fo 52: Värmland Defence District (I 2)
- Fo 53: Kopparberg Defence District (I 13)
- Fo 61: Västerbotten Defence District (I 20)
- Fo 63: Boden Defence District (A 8)
- Fo 66: Kiruna Defence District (I 22)
- Fo 67: Kalix Defence District (independent)

=== 1997 ===
The organisation in 1997:

- P 7/Fo 11: South Scanian Regiment
- P 2/Fo 14: North Scanian Dragoon Regiment
- I 11/Fo 16: Kronoberg Regiment
- I 12/Fo 17: Northern Småland Regiment
- Fo 18: Kalmar Regiment
- I 14/Fo 21: Hälsinge Regiment
- I 5/Fo 22: Jämtland Ranger Regiment
- I 21/Fo 23: Västernorrland Regiment
- I 16/Fo 31: Halland Regiment
- Fo 32: West Coast Naval Command
- I 15/Fo 34: Älvsborg Regiment
- P 4/Fo 35: Skaraborg Regiment
- I 4/Fo 41: Life Grenadier Regiment
- P 10/Fo 43: Södermanland Regiment
- I 1/Fo 44: Svea Life Guards
- S 1/Fo 47: Uppland Regiment
- Fo 48: Västmanland Regiment
- I 3/Fo 51: Life Regiment Grenadiers
- I 2/Fo 52: Värmland Regiment
- I 13/Fo 53: Dalarna Regiment
- I 20/Fo 61: Västerbotten Regiment
- Fo 63: Boden Defence District (Bodens försvarsområde)
- I 22/Fo 66: Lapland Ranger Regiment
- Fo 67: Norrbotten Border Rangers (Norrbottens gränsjägare)

== See also ==
- Military district
- Military subdivisions of Sweden
- List of Swedish defence districts
