= List of Swedish defence districts =

This is a list of Swedish defence districts. The Swedish defence district (Swedish: Försvarsområde, Fo) was an administrative division of the Swedish Armed Forces, and was a lower regional level subdivision, usually corresponding to a Swedish county. The commander of a defence district was the Defence District Commander, who usually commanded local defence units, including infantry, engineers, air defence and light artillery, as well as any Home Guard units in the district. The commander answered to the larger military district that the defence district was part of.

== Fo 1– ==
- Fo 11
  - Malmö försvarsområde (1942–1997)
- Fo 12
  - Ystads försvarsområde (1942–1947)
- Fo 13
  - Helsingborgs försvarsområde (1942–1947)
- Fo 14
  - Kristianstads försvarsområde (1942–1997)
  - Skånes försvarsområde (1997–2000)
- Fo 15
  - Blekinge försvarsområde (1942–1947)
  - Karlskrona försvarsområde (1947–2000)
- Fo 16
  - Växjö försvarsområde (1942–1974)
  - Kronobergs försvarsområde (1974–1992)
  - Kronobergs regemente (1992–1997)
- Fo 17
  - Jönköpings försvarsområde (1942–1947)
  - Jönköpings försvarsområde (1974–1997)
- Fo 18
  - Kalmar försvarsområde (1942–1994)
  - Kalmar regemente (1994–1997)

== Fo 2– ==
- Fo 21
  - Gävle försvarsområde (1942–1966)
  - Gävleborgs försvarsområde (1982–1997)
- Fo 22
  - Östersunds försvarsområde (1942–1974)
  - Jämtlands försvarsområde (1974–2000)
- Fo 23
  - Härnösands försvarsområde (1942–1974)
  - Västernorrlands försvarsområde (1974–2000)
- Fo 24
  - Hemsö försvarsområde (1942–1957)
- Fo 25
  - Sundsvalls försvarsområde (1947–1955)

== Fo 3– ==
- Fo 31
  - Halmstads försvarsområde (1942–1958)
  - Hallands försvarsområde (1958–2000)
- Fo 32
  - Göteborgs försvarsområde (1942–1958)
  - Göteborgs och Bohus försvarsområde (1958–1981)
  - Västra Götalands försvarsområde (1981–2000)
- Fo 33
  - Göteborgs skärgårds försvarsområde (1942–1958)
- Fo 34
  - Uddevalla försvarsområde (1942–1958)
  - Älvsborgs försvarsområde (1958–1997)
- Fo 35
  - Skövde försvarsområde (1942–1974)
  - Skaraborgs försvarsområde (1974–1997)

== Fo 4– ==
- Fo 41
  - Linköpings försvarsområde (1942–1975)
  - Östergötlands försvarsområde (1975–1997)
- Fo 42
  - Norrköpings försvarsområde (1942–1953)
- Fo 42
  - Gotlands försvarsområde (1983–2000)
- Fo 43
  - Strängnäs försvarsområde (1942–1973)
  - Södermanlands försvarsområde (1973–2000)
- Fo 44
  - Stockholms försvarsområde (1942–2000)
- Fo 45
  - Norrtälje försvarsområde (1942–1947)
- Fo 46
  - Stockholms skärgårds försvarsområde (1942–1947)
  - Vaxholms försvarsområde (1947–1975)
- Fo 47
  - Uppsala försvarsområde (1942–2000)
- Fo 48
  - Västerås försvarsområde (1947–1974)
  - Västmanlands försvarsområde (1974–1994)
  - Västmanlands regemente (1994–1997)
- Fo 49
  - Gävle försvarsområde (1966–1973)
  - Gävleborgs försvarsområde (1973–1982)

== Fo 5– ==
- Fo 51
  - Örebro fo (1942–1992)
  - Livregementets grenadjärer (1992–2000)
- Fo 52
  - Karlstads fo (1942–1973)
  - Värmlands fo (1973–)
- Fo 53
  - Falu fo (1942–1973)
  - Kopparbergs fo (1973–)
- Fo 54
  - Mora fo (1942–1953)

== Fo 6– ==
- Fo 61
  - Umeå fo (1942–1973)
  - Västerbottens fo (1973–2000)
- Fo 62
  - Storumans fo (1942–1966)
- Fo 63
  - Bodens fo (1942–1997)
  - Norrbottens fo (1997–2000)
- Fo 64
  - Luleå fo (1942–1947)
- Fo 65
  - Jokkmokks fo (1942–1975)
- Fo 66
  - Kiruna fo (1942–1997)
- Fo 67
  - Morjärvs fo (1942–1947)
  - Kalix fo (1947–1994)
  - Norrbottens gränsjägare (1994–1997)

== See also ==
- Defence district
- Military district
- List of Swedish regiments
