= Henrik Lange =

Swedish Coastal Artillery officer

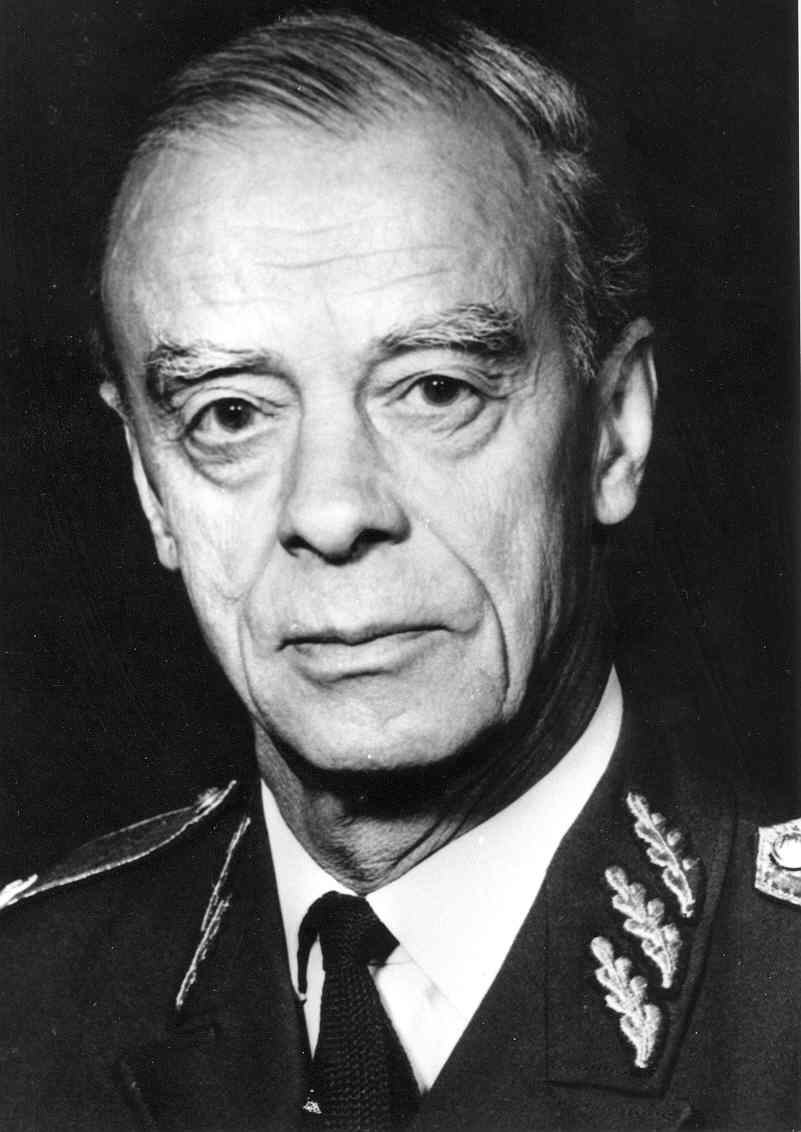
- Born: 27 May 1908; Nacka, Sweden
- Died: 5 November 2000 (aged 92); Lidingö, Sweden
- Burial place: Lidingö Cemetery
- Military career
- Allegiance: Sweden
- Branch: Coastal Artillery (Swedish Navy)
- Service years: 1930–1972
- Rank: Lieutenant General
- Commands: Swedish Coast Artillery School; Section I, Naval Staff; Älvsborg Coastal Artillery Regiment; Gothenburg and Bohus County and Halland Defence District; Gothenburg Coastal Artillery Defence; Swedish Coastal Artillery; Chief of the Naval Staff; Western Military District

Lieutenant General Henrik Lange (27 May 1908 – 5 November 2000) was a Swedish Coastal Artillery officer. Lange had a distinguished military career in the Swedish Coastal Artillery, beginning in 1930 as a commissioned officer. He quickly advanced through the ranks, becoming a lieutenant in 1933 and a captain by 1939. Lange held various key positions, including teacher at the Royal Swedish Naval Academy, adjutant to the Chief of the Swedish Coastal Artillery, and head of a 15 cm artillery battery during World War II. He was promoted to lieutenant colonel in 1950 and colonel in 1954, eventually becoming the Inspector of the Swedish Coastal Artillery in 1961. In 1964, Lange was appointed Chief of the Naval Staff, and in 1968, he became the military commander of the Western Military District, where he served until his retirement as a lieutenant general in 1972.

In addition to his military roles, Lange was actively involved in various military and sports organizations, including serving as deputy chairman of the Central Federation for Voluntary Military Training and chairman of the Swedish Sport Shooting Association. He also contributed to local politics as a member of the Lidingö City Council and held leadership positions within the Royal Swedish Society of Naval Sciences.

== Early life ==
Lange was born on 27 May 1908 in Nacka, Stockholm County, Sweden, the son of Karl Lange, an accountant, and his wife Märtha (née Lagercrantz), a bank clerk. He passed studentexamen at Nya Elementarskolan in 1926 and immediately enrolled at the Royal Swedish Naval Academy.

== Career ==
=== Military career ===
Lange was commissioned as an officer in the Swedish Coastal Artillery in 1930 with the rank of fänrik. He became lieutenant in 1933 and attended the Royal Central Gymnastics Institute from 1933 to 1934 and the Royal Swedish Naval Staff College from 1935 to 1936 and served as regimental adjutant in Karlskrona Coastal Artillery Regiment (KA 2) from 1936 to 1937. Lange attended the Royal Swedish Naval Staff College, where he completed the general course in 1936 and the two-year staff course in 1939. He was promoted to captain in 1939 and served as a teacher at the Royal Swedish Naval Academy from 1940 to 1942. During the first years of the war, he also served as an adjutant to the Chief of the Swedish Coastal Artillery, and in 1942 he became head of a 15 cm artillery battery in Karlskrona.

During the troubled and cold winter of 1942, he participated with a mobile 15 cm artillery battery during the Jämtland field service exercises led by Major General Helge Jung. The artillery battery was grouped with firing direction towards the Norwegian border, but the order was that it would not be camouflaged. It was primarily a demonstration of strength, to show the Germans in Norway that there was modern long-range heavy artillery ready to fire on the border area. He was promoted to major in 1944, and served as battalion commander in Älvsborg Coastal Artillery Detachment (KA 4) in 1945 and was head of department in the Coastal Artillery Inspectorate (Kustartilleriinspektionen) in 1948. The war had brought with it a strong technological development. In 1946, Henrik Lange underwent training in radar service with the Royal Marines in various locations in England, and in 1948, he participated in the Royal Swedish Naval Materiel Administration's radar procurement in the same country.

Lange was promoted to lieutenant colonel in 1950 and served as commanding officer of the Swedish Coast Artillery School (Kustartilleriets skjutskola, KAS) from 1950 to 1954. In 1954, he attended the Swedish Infantry Combat School, and was promoted to colonel and appointed Chief of Section I in the Naval Staff. In 1957, Lange was appointed commanding officer of Gothenburg Coastal Artillery Defence with Älvsborg Coastal Artillery Regiment (KA 4). In 1958, he was appointed Defence District Commander of Gothenburg and Bohus County as well as Halland Defence District (Fo 32/31) as well as commanding officer of Gothenburg Coastal Artillery Defence (GbK). Lange attended the Royal Swedish Army Staff College in 1959 and in 1961 he was promoted to major general and appointed Inspector of the Swedish Coastal Artillery. Lange served in this position for three years and was then Chief of the Naval Staff from 1964 to 1968 and military commander of the Western Military District from 1968 to 1972 when he was promoted to lieutenant general and retired from the military.

=== Other work ===
Lange was deputy chairman of the Central Federation for Voluntary Military Training (Centralförbundet för Befälsutbildning) from 1964 to 1970, a member of the Real Estate Board of the Swedish Armed Forces (Försvarets fastighetsnämnd) from 1954 to 1957 and of the National [Swedish] Board of the Swedish Military Sports Association (Sveriges militära idrottsförbund) from 1947 to 1950. He was secretary there from 1955 to 1957 and chairman from 1957, as well as chairman of its federation board from 1967 to 1972. Lange was also a board member of the Swedish Fencing Association (Svenska Fäktförbundet) from 1948 to 1956, chairman of the Göteborgs sportskyttar ("Gothenburg's Sport Shooters") from 1957 to 1961, of Stockholm Sport Shooting Federation (Stockholms sportskytteförbund) from 1961 to 1964 and of the Swedish Sport Shooting Association (Svenska Sportskytteförbundet, SSF) from 1961 to 1964. Lange was a member of Lidingö City Council from 1963 to 1964. Lange was chairman of Department II of the Royal Swedish Society of Naval Sciences from 1965 to 1968.

== Personal life ==
In 1934, Lange married Birgitta Cedercrona (1913–2005), the daughter of Lieutenant Colonel Hjalmar Cedercrona and Carin Kugelberg. He was the father of Carin (born 1936), Märtha (born 1938) and Carl-Henrik (born 1942).

== Death ==
Lange died on 5 November 2000 in Lidingö and was interred in Lidingö Cemetery on 12 December 2000.

== Dates of rank ==
- 1930 – Second lieutenant
- 1933 – Lieutenant
- 1939 – Captain
- 1944 – Major
- 1950 – Lieutenant colonel
- 1954 – Colonel
- 1961 – Major general
- 1972 – Lieutenant general

== Awards and decorations ==
- (Sweden) Commander Grand Cross of the Order of the Sword (6 June 1968)
- (Sweden) Commander 1st Class of the Order of the Sword (24 November 1960)
- (Sweden) Knight of the Order of Vasa
- (Sweden) Home Guard Medal of Merit in Gold
- (Sweden) Medal for Noble Deeds in gold (1933) (Note: For saving a conscript from drowning in Karlskrona.)
- (Sweden) Swedish Central Federation for Voluntary Military Training Medal of Merit in silver
- (Sweden) Swedish Women's Voluntary Defence Organization Royal Medal of Merit in gold
- (Sweden) Swedish Civil Protection Association Merit Badge in gold
- (Sweden) Swedish Auxiliary Naval Corps's Gold Medal (Sjövärnskårens guldmedalj)
- (Sweden) Swedish Military Sports Association's Gold Medal (Sveriges militära idrottsförbunds guldmedalj)
- (Sweden) (?:s guldmedalj, SVFIGM)
- (Sweden) Swedish Fencing Association's Gold Medal (Svenska fäktförbundets guldmedalj)
- (Sweden) Bohus County Officers' Association's Gold Medal (Bohusläns befälsförbunds guldmedalj)
- (Sweden) Gothenburg Officers' Association's Gold Medal (Göteborgs befälsförbunds guldmedalj)
- (Sweden) Halland Officers' Association's Gold Medal (Hallands befälsförbunds guldmedalj)
- (Sweden) Coastal Artillery Reserve Officer's Badge of Honor (Kustartilleriets reservofficerares hederstecken)
- (Sweden) Army Shooting Medal (Arméns skyttemedalj)

== Honours ==
- Member of the Royal Swedish Society of Naval Sciences (1951)
- Member of the Royal Swedish Academy of War Sciences (1954)
- Honorary member of the Royal Swedish Society of Naval Sciences (1961)

== Footnotes ==
Military offices
Preceded by Sven Haglund	Älvsborg Coastal Artillery Regiment; 1957–1958	Succeeded by Sixten Gråberg
Preceded by Gilbert Nordqvist	Gothenburg and Bohus County as well as Halland Defence District; 1957–1961	Succeeded by Birger Björnsson
Preceded by Sven Haglund	Gothenburg Coastal Artillery Defence; 1957–1961	Succeeded by Birger Björnsson
Preceded by Rudolf Kolmodin	Inspector of the Swedish Coastal Artillery; 1961–1964	Succeeded by Arne Widner
Preceded by Oscar Krokstedt	Chief of the Naval Staff; 1964–1968	Succeeded by Bo Westin
Preceded by Oscar Krokstedt	Western Military District; 1968–1972	Succeeded by Claës Skoglund
