= Rudolf Kolmodin =

Swedish Coastal Artillery officer

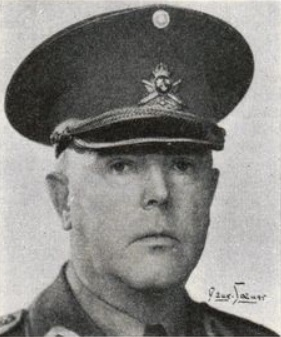
- Born: Karl Rudolf Kolmodin; 17 January 1896; Stockholm, Sweden
- Died: 29 August 1978 (aged 82); Stockholm, Sweden
- Burial place: Norra begravningsplatsen
- Military career
- Allegiance: Sweden
- Branch: Coastal Artillery (Swedish Navy)
- Service years: 1916–1961
- Rank: Lieutenant General
- Commands: Älvsborg Fortress; Älvsborg Coastal Artillery Regiment; Gothenburg Coastal Artillery Defence; Stockholm Coastal Artillery Defence; Stockholm Archipelago Defence District; Inspector of the Coastal Artillery

Lieutenant General Karl Rudolf Kolmodin (17 January 1896 – 29 August 1978) was a Swedish Coastal Artillery officer. Kolmodin's senior commands include postings as commanding officer of the Gothenburg Coastal Artillery Defence and Stockholm Coastal Artillery Defence and as Inspector of the Swedish Coastal Artillery.

== Early life ==
Kolmodin was born on 17 January 1896 in Bromma Parish, Stockholm, Sweden, the son of Professor Adolf Kolmodin (1855–1928) and his wife Nelly (née von Post) (1858–1944). He was the brother of Colonel Gustaf Kolmodin (1893–1975) and Diplomat Johannes Kolmodin (1884–1933). Kolmodin passed studentexamen in Uppsala in 1914.

== Career ==
Kolmodin was commissioned as an officer in the Swedish Coastal Artillery in 1916 with the rank of second lieutenant. He was promoted to lieutenant in 1918. Kolmodin attended the general course of the Royal Swedish Naval Staff College from 1921 to 1922 and the senior course of the Artillery and Engineering College from 1922 to 1924. He served as an Adjutant in the staff of the commanding officer of the Swedish Coastal Artillery from 1925 to 1928 and as a mathematics, physics and artillery teacher at the Royal Swedish Naval Staff College and the Swedish Coast Artillery School (Kustartilleriets skjutskola, KAS) from 1927 to 1937. Kolmodin then served in the Artillery Department of the Royal Swedish Naval Materiel Administration from 1928 to 1935. He also served as an expert in the 1930 Defense Commission (1930 års försvarskommission) from 1930 to 1935.

Kolmodin was promoted to captain in 1929 and to major in 1936. He was appointed Chief of Staff of the Fortification Staff (Fästningsstaben) at Vaxholm Fortress in 1937 and in 1941 he was promoted to lieutenant colonel and first became Air Defence Commander at Karlskrona Fortress. When, during World War II, it was deemed necessary to provide the Swedish west coast with an effective coastal artillery defence, it was Kolmodin, who led the final expansion of this defence and gained command of it. He served as Commandant of Älvsborg Fortress in Gothenburg in 1941. In 1942, Älvsborg Coastal Artillery Regiment (KA 4) in Gothenburg was raised and Kolmodin was promoted to colonel and became its first commander. He was at the same time commanding officer of Gothenburg Coastal Artillery Defence. Four year later, Kolmodin became commanding officer of Stockholm Coastal Artillery Defence (Stockholms kustartilleriförsvar, SK) and Defence District Commander of Stockholm Archipelago Defence District (Stockholms skärgårds försvarsområde, Fo 46). In 1953, Kolmodin was promoted to major general and appointed Inspector of the Swedish Coastal Artillery. Kolmodin was chairman of the 1958 Defense Command Commission (1958 års försvarsledningskommission) and an expert in the 1960 Defense Command Inquiry (1960 års försvarsledningsutredning). In 1961, Kolmodin retired from the military and was promoted to lieutenant general.

== Personal life ==
In 1934, Kolmodin married Baroness Christina Leijonhufvud (1902–1994), the daughter of major general, Baron Gösta Leijonhufvud and Sigrid Lagercrantz.

== Death ==
Kolmodin died on 29 August 1978 in Oscar Parish, Stockholm and was interred at Norra begravningsplatsen in Stockholm.

== Dates of rank ==
- 1916 – Second lieutenant
- 1918 – Lieutenant
- 1929 – Captain
- 1936 – Major
- 1941 – Lieutenant colonel
- 1942 – Colonel
- 1953 – Major general
- 1961 – Lieutenant general

== Awards and decorations ==
Kolmodin's awards:

- (Sweden) Commander Grand Cross of the Order of the Sword (4 June 1960)
- (Sweden) Knight of the Order of Vasa
- (Sweden) Home Guard Medal of Merit in Gold
- (Sweden) Swedish Central Federation for Voluntary Military Training Medal of Merit in silver
- (Sweden) Swedish Women's Voluntary Defence Organization Royal Medal of Merit in gold
- (Sweden) Swedish Military Sports Association's Gold Medal (Sveriges militära idrottsförbunds guldmedalj)
- (Sweden) 2 x Sjövärnsflottiljen's Gold Medal
- (Sweden) (Sthlmsförsv:KGM)
- (Sweden) Stockholm Officers’ Association's Silver Medal (Stockholms befälsförbunds silvermedalj)
- (Sweden) Coastal Artillery Reserve Officer's Badge of Honor (Kustartilleriets reservofficerares hederstecken)

=== Foreign ===
- (Denmark) Commander 1st Class of the Order of the Dannebrog

== Honours ==
- Member of the Royal Swedish Academy of War Sciences (1939)
- President of the Royal Swedish Academy of War Sciences (1961–1963)
- Member of the Royal Swedish Society of Naval Sciences (1943)
- Honorary member of the Royal Swedish Society of Naval Sciences (1953)

Military offices
Preceded by Åke Wockatz	Älvsborg Fortress; 1941–1942	Succeeded by None
Preceded by None	Älvsborg Coastal Artillery Regiment; 1942–1946	Succeeded by Harald Callerström
Preceded by None	Gothenburg Coastal Artillery Defence; 1942–1946	Succeeded by Harald Callerström
Preceded by Harald Engblom	Stockholm Coastal Artillery Defence; 1946–1953	Succeeded by Sten Puke
Preceded by Harald Engblom	Stockholm Archipelago Defence District; 1946–1953	Succeeded by Sten Puke
Preceded by Hjalmar Åström	Inspector of the Swedish Coastal Artillery; 1953–1961	Succeeded by Henrik Lange
Professional and academic associations
Preceded by Erik Samuelson	President of the Royal Swedish Academy of War Sciences; 1961–1963	Succeeded by Bert Carpelan
