= Per Carleson =

Swedish fencer (1917–2004)

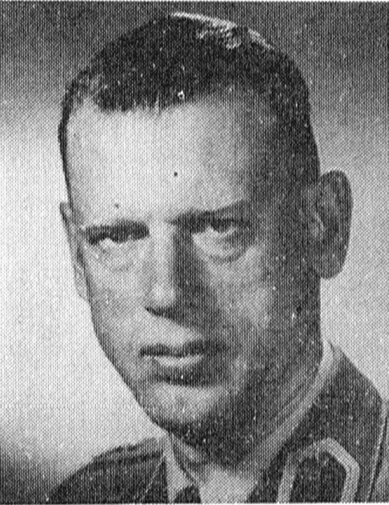
- Born: Per Hjalmar Ludvig Carleson; 11 July 1917; Stockholm, Sweden
- Died: 8 June 2004 (aged 86); Gothenburg, Sweden
- Military career
- Allegiance: Sweden
- Branch: Coastal Artillery (Swedish Navy)
- Service years: 1940–1977
- Rank: Senior Colonel
- Commands: Coastal Ranger School; Fo 32/31; Gothenburg Coastal Artillery Defence

Senior Colonel Per Hjalmar Ludvig Carleson (11 July 1917 – 8 June 2004) was a Swedish officer and épée fencer. Carleson was one of the founders of the Swedish Coastal Rangers.

== Early life ==
Carleson was born on 11 July 1917 in Stockholm, Sweden, the son of captain Waldemar Carleson and his wife Gunnila (née Unge). He grew up in Stockholm with four brothers. Early attention was paid to his great interest and aptitude for swimming. During high school years at Högre latinläroverket å Norrmalm, he became Swedish champion and record holder in the 100 m backstroke. He attended Norra Latin in Stockholm where he was chairman of the sports association (Norra Latins Idrottsförening, NLIF) between 1935 and 1936. Carleson passed studentexamen at Norra Latin in 1937, after which he studied at Stockholm University College. He was adopted as a reserve cadet in the Swedish Coastal Artillery in 1939, and studied the same year at the Royal Swedish Naval Academy, after which he was appointed second lieutenant in the Swedish Coastal Artillery's reserve in 1940.

== Career ==
=== Military career ===
Carleson took the officer course at the Royal Swedish Naval Academy from 1940 to 1941, after which he graduated as an officer in 1941 and the same year was commissioned as an officer and appointed second lieutenant and was assigned to Vaxholm Coastal Artillery Regiment (KA 1) where he immediately started serving in a unit in the outermost coastline. Carleson was promoted to lieutenant in 1942. Later he became commander of a training company in Vaxholm. After graduation from the Swedish Army Physical Training School (Arméns gymnastik- och idrottsskola), he was placed as a cadet and sports officer at the Royal Swedish Naval Academy. Carleson attended the Royal Swedish Naval Staff College from 1944 to 1946, and was then promoted to captain in 1947 and then the staff and artillery course at the Royal Swedish Naval Staff College from 1947 to 1949.

Carleson served in the Naval Staff from 1949 to 1953, in the Vaxholm Coastal Artillery Regiment from 1953 to 1954, in the Military Office of the Minister of Defence from 1954 to 1956 and again in the Vaxholm Coastal Artillery Regiment from 1956 to 1957. He was involved in studies and planning for the creation of mobile ground combat forces in an archipelago environment and was given the opportunity to follow the education at a French amphibious school in Algeria and then undergo combat diver training in the Swedish Navy. As a result of an amphibious investigation, appointed by Sweden's Supreme Commander and boat investigations in the Naval Staff, the Chief of the Navy was commissioned by the Supreme Commander to carry out experimental training of mobile ground combat units in the archipelago. It was natural that the Coastal Artillery Inspector appointed the then captain Carleson to prepare and conduct this activity in 1956. He thus became the founder and first head of the Coastal Ranger School (1956–1957). Carleson's ideal instructor was, with his own words "skilful in hand-to-hand combat, skilled navigator of the archipelago, good at orienteering, preferably a combat diver, knowledgeable signaller and artillery observer, and also strong, durable and provided with good judgment".

Carleson was promoted to major in 1957 and served in the Defence Staff from 1957 to 1962. In 1962 he was promoted to lieutenant colonel and appointed chief of staff of the Norrland Coastal Artillery Defence (Norrlands kustartilleriförsvar, NK). In 1964, Carleson was promoted to colonel and appointed chief of Section 2 in the Naval Staff. Carleson was promoted to senior colonel in 1969 and was appointed commanding officer of the Gothenburg and Bohus Defence District as well as Halland Defence District (Fo 31/32) as well as commander of Gothenburg Coastal Artillery Defence (GbK). He held this position until 1977.

=== Sports career ===
Per Carleson
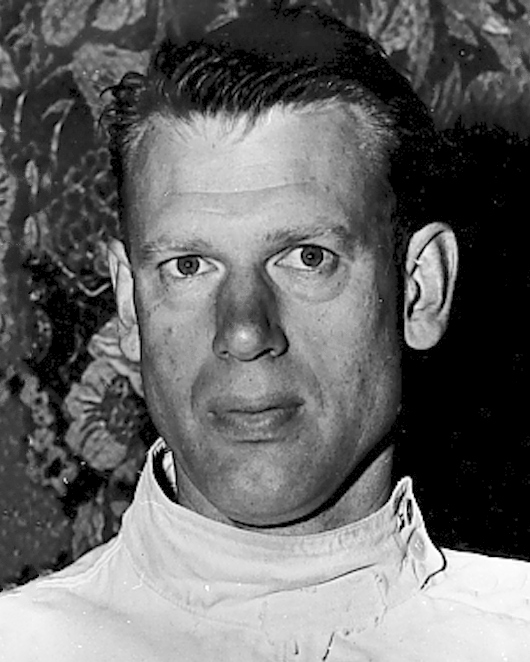

Personal information
- Born: 11 July 1917 Stockholm, Sweden
- Died: 8 June 2004 (aged 86) Gothenburg, Sweden

Sport
- Sport: Fencing
- Event: Épée
- Club: KA1 IF, Vaxholm; FFF, Stockholm
Medal record
Representing Sweden
Olympic Games
Bronze medal – third place	1948 London	Épée, team
Silver medal – second place	1952 Helsinki	Épée, team
World Championships
Silver medal – second place	1947 Lisbon	Épée, team
Silver medal – second place	1949 Cairo	Épée, team
Bronze medal – third place	1949 Cairo	Épée, ind.
Bronze medal – third place	1950 Monte Carlo	Épée, team
Bronze medal – third place	1951 Stockholm	Épée, team
Silver medal – second place	1954 Luxembourg	Épée, team

Carleson competed at the 1948, 1952 and 1956 Olympics and won two team medals, in 1948 and 1952. He was a Swedish Olympic flag bearer at the 1948 and 1956 Games.

Carleson started as a backstroke swimmer, and in the late 1930s held a national record and was a national champion over 100 m. Besides his Olympic achievements, he won three silver and three bronze medals at the world championships between 1947 and 1954.

== Later life ==
He became president of Majorna's Rotary club in Gothenburg and governor of the district and Swedish representative in the international law council. For his efforts, he received the Paul P. Harris Fellow recognition and became honorary member of his own Rotary club. During his last year of life, he received an award that greatly pleased him. The voluntary education organization Förbundet Kustjägarna ("Coastal Ranger Association"), which was formed in 2003, handed over its newly established gold medal with number 1 to Carleson.

== Personal life ==
In 1952, he married Karin Stenbeck (born 1906), the daughter of Magnus Ekstedt and Anna (née Hörman).

== Death ==
Carleson died on 8 June 2004 in Gothenburg. He was interred on 20 July 2004 at the Western Cemetery in Gothenburg.

== Dates of rank ==
- 1940 – Second lieutenant
- 1942 – Lieutenant
- 1947 – Captain
- 1957 – Major
- 1962 – Lieutenant colonel
- 1964 – Colonel
- 1969 – Senior colonel

== Awards and decorations ==
- (Sweden) Commander 1st Class of the Order of the Sword (5 June 1971)
- (Sweden) Commander of the Order of the Sword (6 June 1968)
- (Sweden) Knight 1st Class of the Order of the Sword (1959)
- (Sweden) Coastal Ranger Association Medal of Merit in gold (Förbundet Kustjägarnas förtjänstmedalj i guld) (2003)
- (Sweden) Swedish Fencing Federation's Medal of Merit and Elite Badge

== Honours ==
- Member of the Royal Swedish Society of Naval Sciences (1966)
