= Käringberget =

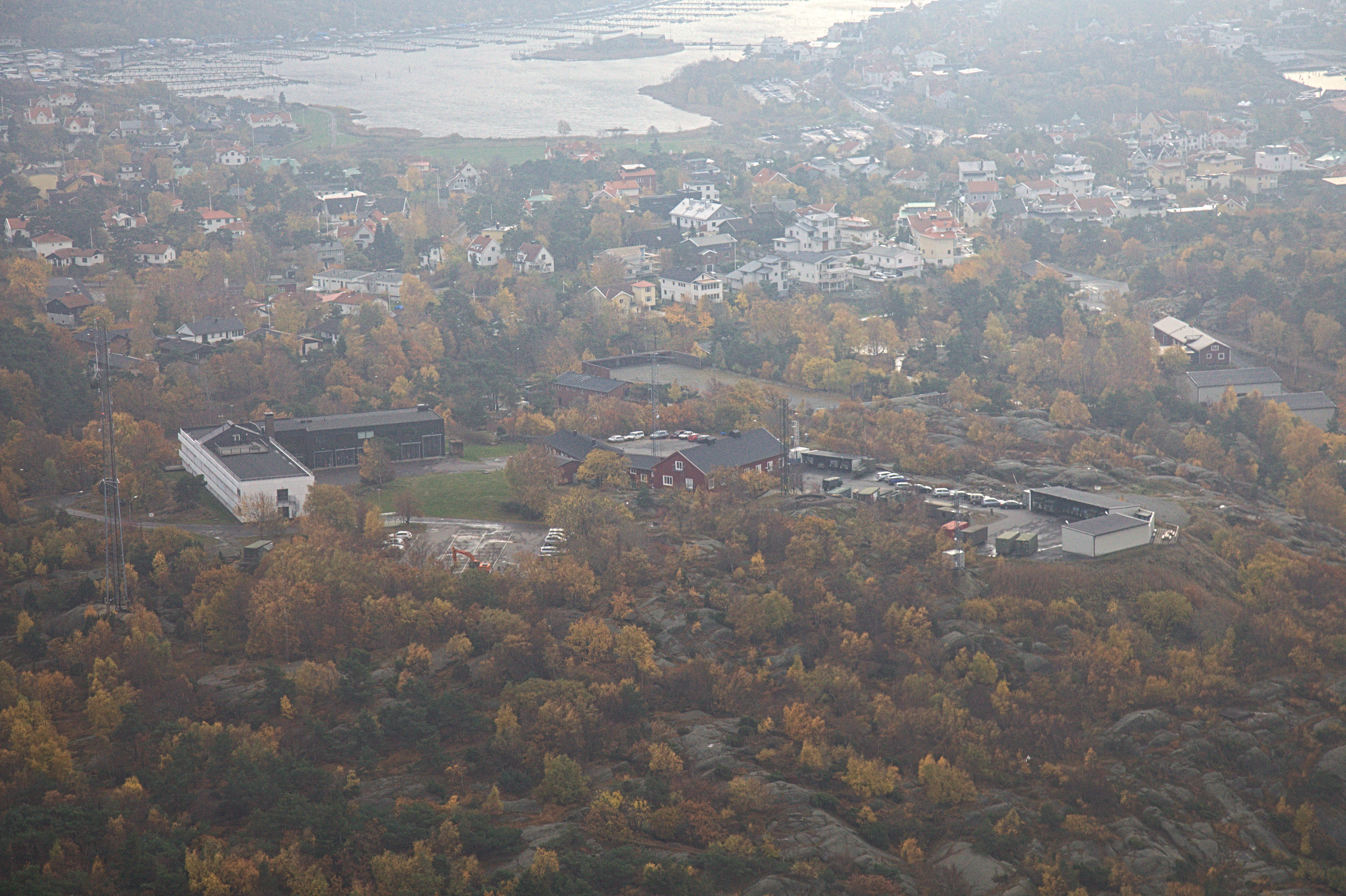
The garrison's facilities on Käringberget.

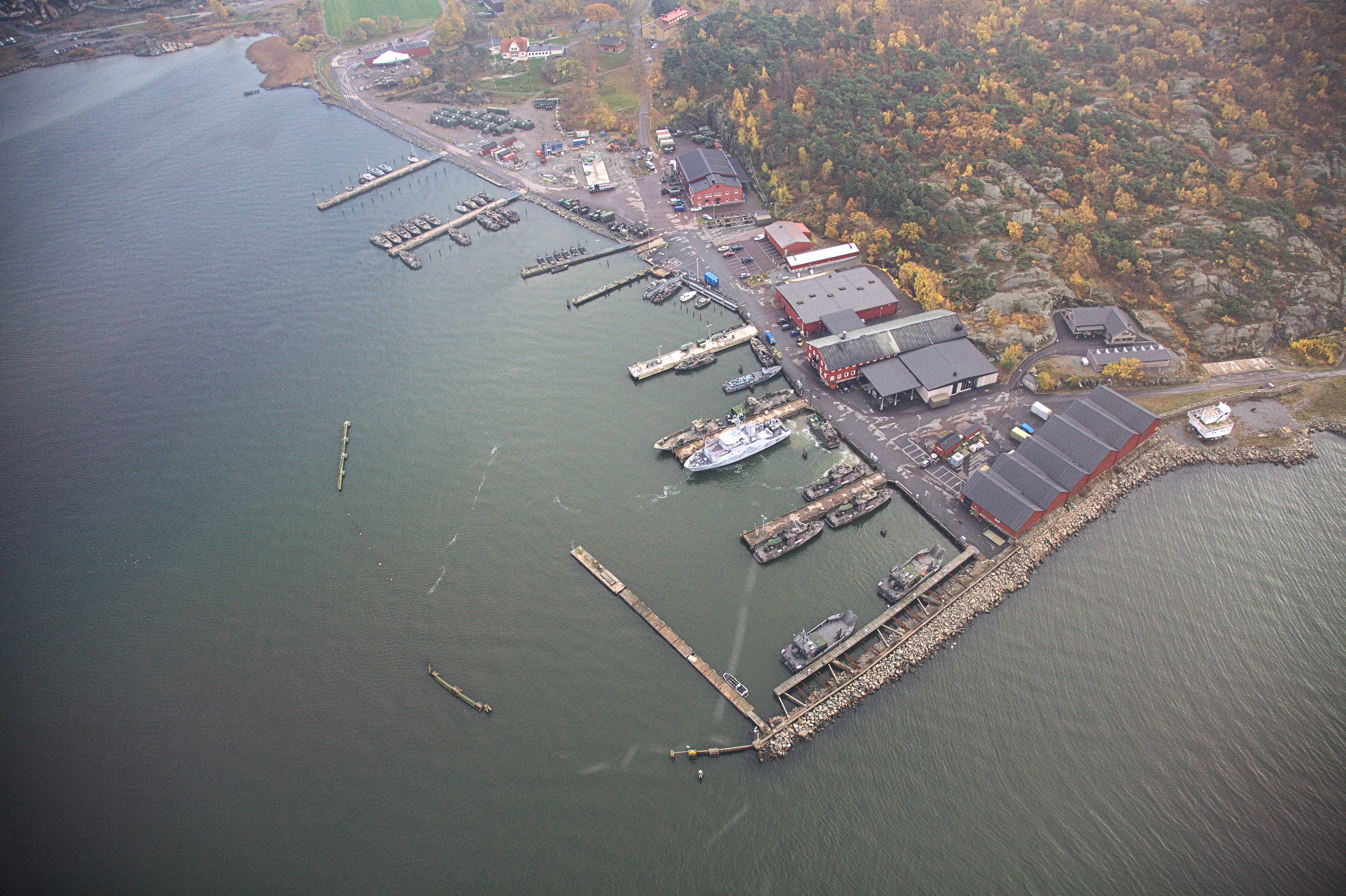
Älvnabben below Käringberget.

Käringberget is an area in the Älvsborg district in Gothenburg, Sweden.

The name Käringberget has been used since the 1530s, through the former homestead Käringberget and was then written Kerlingeborg. The name development has been; Kiæringhaberik (1565), Kiäringeberget (1573–1679), Kierringeberget (1777), Kärringeberget (1825).

The name contains käring in the meaning "sea mark, cairn for guidance for seafarers". Signaling from the mountain is mentioned around the year 1774. Käringebergs rös ("Käringeberg's cairn") was demolished around 1896 in connection with the Swedish state buying the land. The local tradition, however, states this interpretation of the name: "When all the men had been out on the lake and approached the home, they used to see the ladies standing on the mountain and looking for them."

In 1887, a cistern was built at Käringberget, manufactured at Lindholmen's workshop, which held 12,000 barrels of petroleum. The cistern was filled directly from the tankers, owned by the Nobel companies, which arrived from Saint Petersburg.

At Käringberget are the military base Gothenburg Garrison, the Maritime Rescue Coordination Centre and the Swedish Coast Guard's command center for the Southwest Region.
