= Nya Varvet =

Borough of Gothenburg, Sweden

Coordinates: 57°41′6″N 11°53′28″E

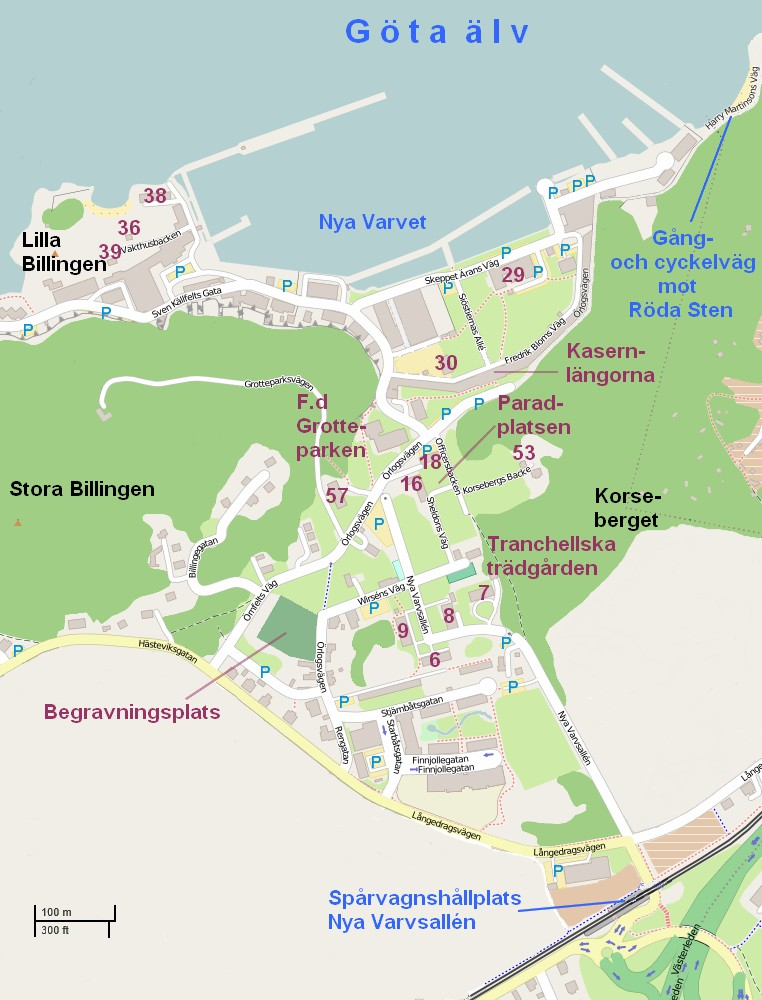
Map of the central parts of Nya Varvet, with some of the area's building numbers marked

Nya Varvet (lit. 'New Shipyard') is a district, a former naval base, and a prison in the Municipality of Gothenburg. The district covers an area of 80 hectares. From 1876 to 1931, the area constituted the Nya Varvet Rural Municipality.

The area, which is located at the mouth of the Göta River, was designated as a planned naval base around 1700, in connection with the outbreak of the Great Northern War. During the final stages of the war, in 1717 and 1719, the naval base was attacked by Danish warships under the command of Vice Admiral Peter Tordenskjold. Later in the 18th century, the area was used mainly as an anchorage, although parts of the Army Fleet were based there.

Shipbuilding operations were carried out at the Gamla Varvet (Old Shipyard), established in 1660 at Stigberget. In connection with the Napoleonic Wars at the beginning of the 19th century, the area's defenses were strengthened and new buildings were constructed. After this, activity gradually declined, and in 1870 the area was transferred to the National Prisons Board to be used as a prison.

Following the dissolution of the union with Norway in 1905, the area once again gained greater importance. During the two World Wars, military operations at the site were expanded further. Following a decision by the Swedish Parliament, the area was sold to private civilian interests in 1985. Today, the area contains various types of civilian businesses and private residences. Bus and tram connections, including the Långedrag Line, connect the area both with central Gothenburg and with Långedrag and Saltholmen to the west.

Most of the buildings at Nya Varvet were officially designated as historic buildings on 25 January 1935. After the Swedish Navy's activities at Nya Varvet gradually ceased during the 1980s, Nya Varvet was divided into three subareas. The buildings within one of these three areas are covered by the historic-building designation and the associated preservation regulations. One of these buildings is the "Officers' Mess Nobis," which was designated a historic building on 1 January 2005. The other two buildings are Building 36, the "Old Guardhouse," and Building 38, the "Inventory Room," both of which were designated historic buildings on 9 December 1986.
