= Battle of Sävar =

1809 battle of the Finnish War

- Part of the Finnish War (Napoleonic Wars)
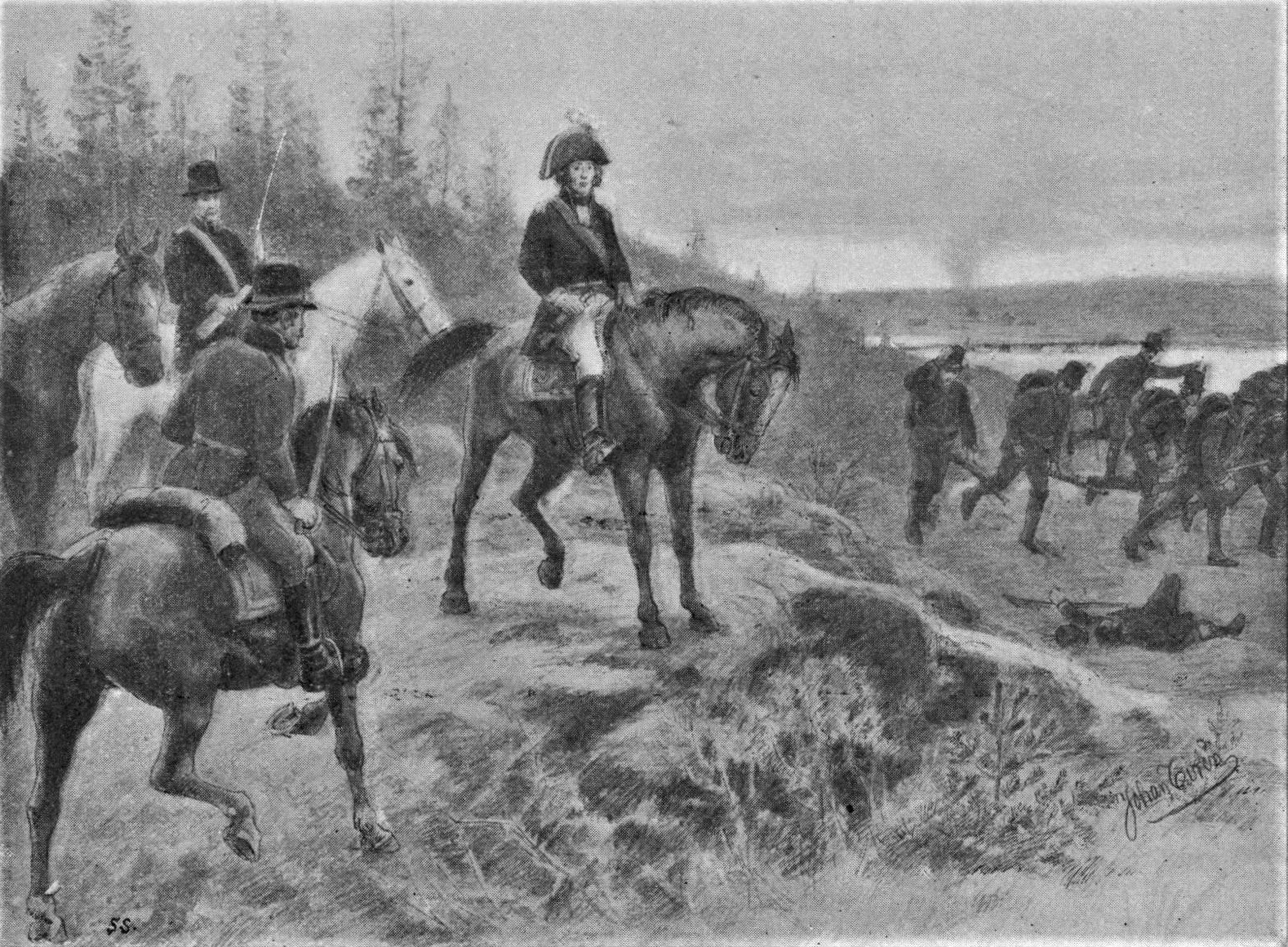
- Wachtmeister at Sävar, by Johan Tirén
Date	19 August 1809
Location	Sävar, in Västerbotten, Sweden 63°54′5″N 20°33′25″E
Result	Russian victory

Belligerents
Sweden	Russian Empire

Commanders and leaders
Gustaf Wachtmeister	(Russian Empire) Nikolay Kamensky

Strength
4,644; 10 guns	5,500; 8 guns

Casualties and losses
Swedish accounts: 800–850 Russian accounts: 2,000 (including losses at Djäkneboda and Ratan)	Russian accounts: 1,400 Swedish accounts: 2,000–3,000 (including losses at Djäkneboda and Ratan)

The Battle of Sävar was fought on Saturday, 19 August 1809, between Swedish and Russian forces, during the Finnish War; it was the last pitched battle to be fought in Sweden. After the Russian conquest of eastern Sweden (present-day Finland) in 1808, the Swedish forces retreated to actual Sweden. In March the following year, Russian emperor Alexander I launched a threefold attack on Sweden, to force the country into the Continental System and to cede Finland to the Russian Empire; despite early advantages at Kalix and the Åland Islands, the attack failed to achieve a quick ending to the war. After further campaigning in northern Sweden, with battles such as Skellefteå and Hörnefors, the Russian forces under Nikolay Kamensky occupied all of Västerbotten by June.

The Swedes, who were ready to cede Finland, disputed Alexander I's demands of having the border at the Kalix River. To improve the terms, a Swedish expedition to Västerbotten was prepared, under the command of Johan af Puke, to cut off Kamensky from Russian-occupied Finland by landing at Ratan (a village north of Umeå); Fabian Wrede would simultaneously come from the south, by which Kamensky would be crushed between the two Swedish forces. The Swedes landed at Ratan on 17 August and the army, led by Gustaf Wachtmeister, marched south towards Umeå. Wachtmeister, however, was excessively cautious and failed to reach Umeå before Kamensky had already passed through the city and marched straight at him, to break free.

On the 19th, the Swedish army was attacked in a disadvantageous position at Sävar and, instead of withdrawing across the river, Wachtmeister chose to fight over the vital heights of Krutbrånet. More fighting occurred further south towards Ytterboda as Kamensky sent a diversion force to attack the Swedish flank. Around midday, Wachtmeister withdrew his troops at Krutbrånet across the river to Sävar, even though he still had five battalions in reserve - while Kamensky was down to his last. Kamensky sent another force over the river of which half attacked the Swedes near Ytterboda, who had thus far been very successful, and the other assaulted Sävar itself. As he was now cut off from the Swedes at Ytterboda, and with intensified Russian pressure across the river, Wachtmeister chose to retreat; the battle was, along with the Battle of Oravais the previous year, the bloodiest of the war.

Instead of retaking a position at Djäkneboda, as planned, Wachtmeister fell back to Ratan, which allowed the Russians to use the main road north - Kamensky had thus managed to slip out of the intended trap; he sent a force the following day to attack the Swedes at Ratan, to cover his retreat. Wrede received word of the Swedish landing on the 19th (as the battle of Sävar had already ended) and set march north the following day. He took Umeå on the 24th, as the last Russian battalion marched north. The Swedish expedition had failed to destroy Kamensky's army, but it had been forced out of Västerbotten. According to the subsequent Treaty of Fredrikshamn, the Swedes ceded Finland to Russia all the way to the Torne River; the somewhat weaker Russian demands were most likely a result of the Västerbotten expedition.

== Background ==
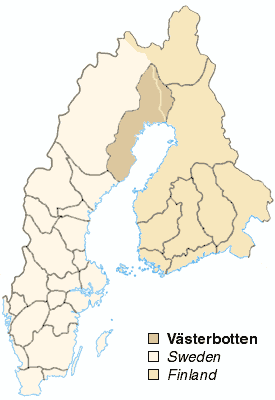
Västerbotten, Sweden in 1809

Following the Convention of Olkijoki, signed on 19 November, the Swedish army withdrew over the Kemi River in December and thus abandoned the eastern part of the kingdom (present-day Finland), after nine months of fighting. In March the next year, in the midst of the Swedish revolution (in which Gustav IV Adolf was overthrown and subsequently replaced by his uncle Charles XIII), Alexander I ordered a threefold attack on actual Sweden, to force the country into submission; he demanded that Sweden would enter the Continental System, while also ceding its eastern territorium to the Russian Empire. The offensive, in which about 30,000 Russians participated, forced the Swedish armies to withdraw from Åland and Umeå, while another force capitulated at Kalix, in Norrbotten. Despite the early triumphs, however, another convention was signed, which deprived the Russian emperor from achieving a quick victory.

Angered by the prolonged negotiations, Alexander I ordered a continued offensive in northern Sweden; in May, a small Swedish force was quickly overwhelmed at the Battle of Skellefteå—after an heroic defence which saved the vital provisions—leading to the Russian capture of Umeå. Västerbotten, all the way from the Kemi and Öre Rivers, was thus occupied by the Russians who, after being denied the Swedish magazines, suffered greatly from the lack of provisions. These could not be brought overseas, since the Swedes had naval supremacy over the Bothnian Bay. After a Swedish counterattack at the Battle of Hörnefors by Johan August Sandels, in July, the fighting once again died out in favor of the prolonged, but ongoing, peace negotiations. Many Russian deserters seized the opportunity to surrender themselves to the closest Swedish forces. The same month, Nikolay Kamensky replaced Pavel Andreyevich Shuvalov as the overall commander of the Russian army; he made plans to force the crossing at the Öre River (behind which Sandels' army was positioned) and march into Ångermanland the following month, to collect provisions. (Note: Kamensky became commander at the end of July, or earlier, according to Johannesson. According to Hornborg, he was made commander at the beginning of August.)

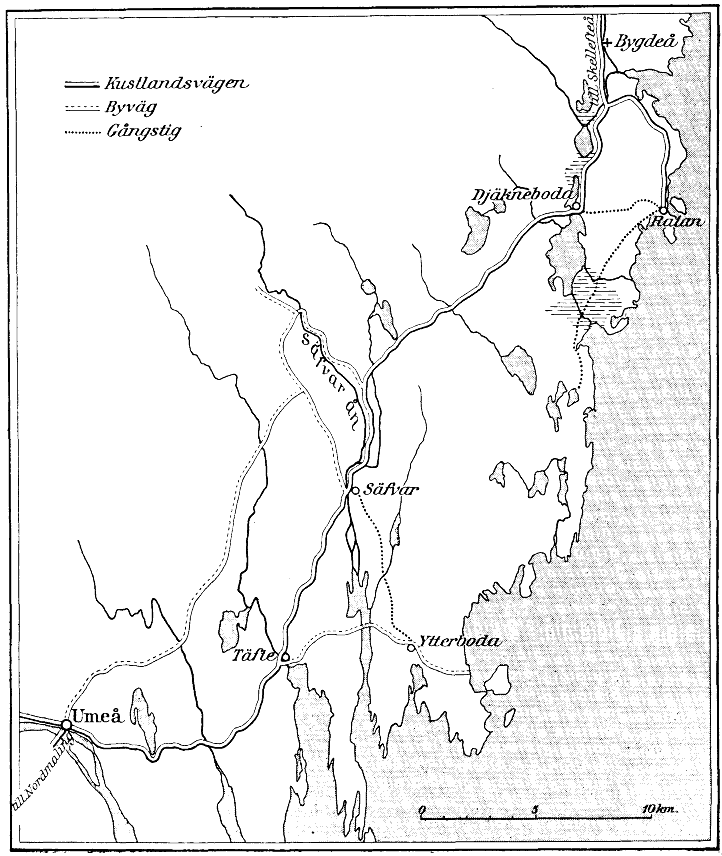
Map of the areas between Umeå and Ratan (with Sävar and Ytterboda)

=== Västerbotten expedition ===
Sweden, while having accepted the loss of its eastern territorium, disputed the Russian demands by Alexander I of having the border (between Sweden and Russian–Finland) established behind the Kalix River; to somehow improve the terms, a Swedish council of war on 19 July decided upon a large combined naval–land operation against Kamensky's troops occupying Västerbotten. The Swedes mustered 10,300–11,000 men (including naval personnel), under the Supreme Command of Johan af Puke, as part of a fleet which would land 6,800 men under Gustaf Wachtmeister behind enemy lines. (Note: The decision of not having a veteran from the war commanding the expedition, such as Adlercreutz, von Vegesack, Wrede, Sandels, or von Döbeln, has since been questioned by many.) Simultaneously, Fabian Wrede and Sandels (with 4,000 men) would advance from the Öre River in the south, the Russian army would thus be caught between the hammer and anvil. Kamensky's forces around Umeå counted about 8,000 men, excluding 3,500 who either served on the Russian flotilla or patrolled the coastline between Umeå and Uleåborg.

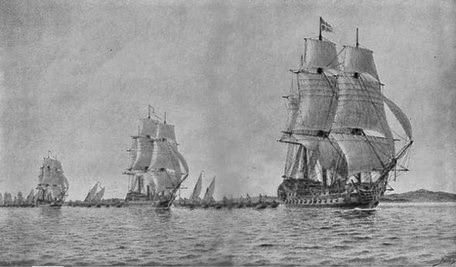
Swedish fleet sailing through Kvarken towards Ratan, by Jacob Hägg

The Swedish fleet anchored outside Ratan on 16 August and started disembarking the troops the following day accordingly. Puke ordered Wachtmeister to rapidly march south to retake Umeå. On his way, Wachtmeister received false intelligence of an enemy threat to the north, against which he unnecessarily dispatched the whole Uppland Regiment with two guns. Further south, at Djäkneboda and the nearby passage, about 420 Russians were quickly beaten back by the Swedish vanguard of 220 men, after having lost 10 men in captured. As Wachtmeister feared enemy counterattacks along the way, he had his army march at a remarkably slow pace of 2.5 km (2 mi) an hour, during which only minor engagements occurred; he reached Sävar around midday on the 18th and there decided to rest his troops for the whole day and night—against the given orders by Puke which advocated for a quick march to Umeå—he was soon informed that Kamensky had turned about and was marching right at him.

Kamensky had received news of Wachtmeister's landing in his rear on the 17th and immediately cancelled his incipient southern campaign and marched north, to confront him; he left three battalions (1,200 men) against Wrede to mask the withdrawal, supported by a reserve of 1,000 men at Umeå. Contrary to his Swedish foe, Kamensky marched rapidly with his army, which went through Umeå the following day. Without the essential land support, an attempt made by the Swedish fleet to destroy the bridge going over the Ume River, to slow down the Russian troop movements, could easily be repulsed the same day; the two Swedish forces lacked in communication as well as cooperation, with neither general willing to make any significant movements before the other. Kamensky reached Täfteå the next day, after which he continued on towards Sävar to attack the Swedish general. Wachtmeister had dispatched a battalion northwest to Tväråmark to secure a side road towards Sävar, where he remained in a disadvantageous position which was exposed from the south; had he instead marched to Umeå as planned, or even Täfteå, he would have gained a much superior position to defend.

== Battle ==
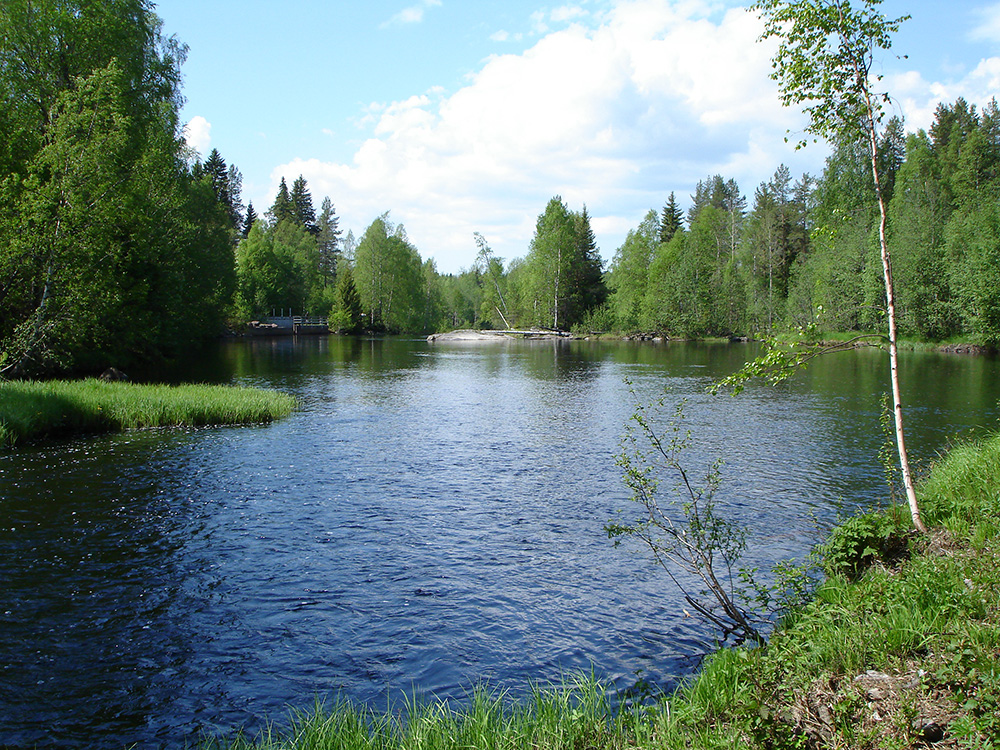
Pålböle River outlet (into the Sävar River)

Wachtmeister had 4,644 men and 10 guns at his dispositional, as several dispatchments had been sent elsewhere to cover his flanks and rear, (Note: After the landing at Ratan, the Uppland Regiment of 800–1,000 men with 2 guns was ordered north, to cover the Swedish rear; 350–700 men including sick remained at Ratan and on the fleet; 150–500 men were used to transport ammunition; the 1st Jönköping battalion, with all the regimental Jägers (about 500 men), was sent northwest of Sävar (Tväråmark) and would not participate in the battle.) while Kamensky's army counted between 5,000 and 6,000 men with 8 guns. Only the first out of three Swedish divisions was deployed west of the rather fordable Sävar River, which runs south to north through the village, while the second and third initially remained on the east side. The first brigade established outposts to the west of Sävar, as well as on the vital wooded heights further southwest, called Krutbrånet—referred to, by Wachtmeister, as "virtually a fortress"—on which the main confrontation would take place. The distance between Krutbrånet and the Sävar bridge was about 1 km (1 mi) over mainly open fields and valleys, which were split by a small stream (Oxbäcken) which ran in a north-western direction from the river.

Additional Swedish outposts were established along the river to the south, towards Ytterboda—about 6 km (4 mi) south of Sävar and 2 km (1 mi) east of the river—to observe possible crossings; the wadable river bay with its overgoing ferry was of particular strategic interest to both sides. The pathway between the two villages went over Finnberget (Finnish mountain), where much of the fighting on this side would take place. The bulk of the Russian army, which was hungry, exhausted and desperate to break through the Swedish trap, was marching northeast, from Täfteå, on the main road running over Krutbrånet; 600 men had been diverted to force the crossing at the ferry, northwest of Ytterboda, to fall upon Sävar in the Swedish flank (an additional 250 was sent over later). The battlefield was, apart from the fields around Sävar and a few lakes, mainly covered in woods and some bogland which could only be traversed after certain difficulty.

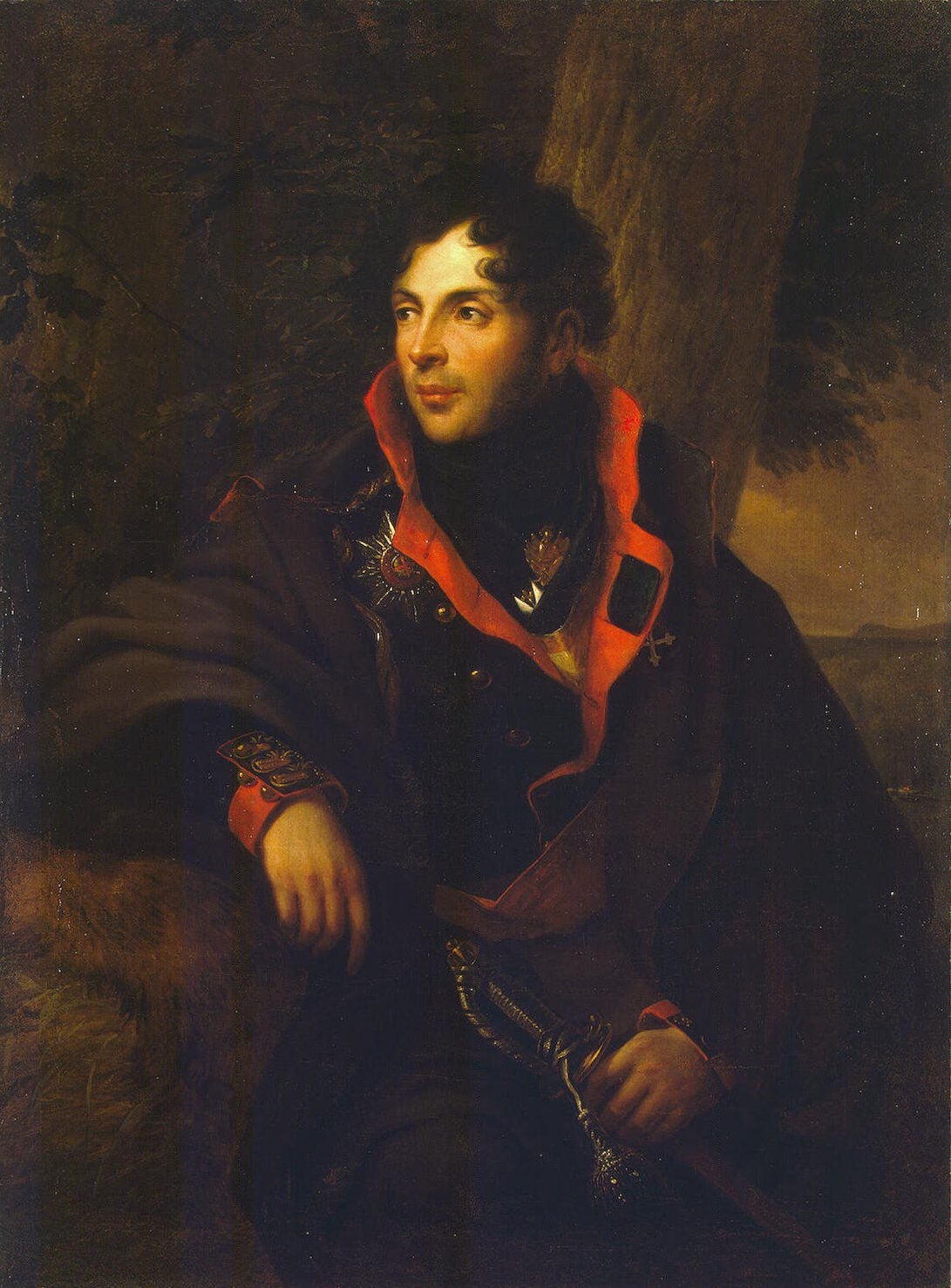
Russian commander Nikolay Kamensky, by Friedrich Georg Weitsch

=== Fighting over Krutbrånet ===
At 06:30, the vanguard of the first Russian column encountered the outposts of a Södermanland battalion just south of Krutbrånet. The few Swedes resisted bravely and even brought a few prisoners back, as they were eventually forced to withdraw. When Kamensky had 1,200 men at hand, he ordered a general attack towards Krutbrånet, from where the whole Swedish battalion concurrently counter-attacked; it came down to a bitter bayonet struggle, until the Swedes were eventually overwhelmed by the sheer weight of the Russian attack, which had increased to about 2,500 men. A renewed attack by the Swedish battalion, reinforced with another, was repulsed. Sometime past 08:30, Kamensky was finally able to deploy his artillery near the road on the heights, which made him the master of the summit. The Swedes retook a position slightly north, at the down slope of Krutbrånet, just south of the small stream. The two armies faced each other in rough lines—as much as the terrain allowed—north to south, in a distance of less than 200 m (656 ft): The Russian formation stretched from the river in the east to the nearest lake in the west (Kesen); the Swedes, who were outnumbered, had their left to the river and the right just past Krutbrånet, opposite the Russian centre.

Wachtmeister, alarmed by the gunfire coming from Krutbrånet, sent reinforcements which allowed battalions without ammo to march back to Sävar to resupply. From his centre, Kamensky observed the Swedish movements and ordered his left wing to sweep around the Swedish right, in an attempt to separate them from the main body. As a result, the Swedish right wing drifted further apart from the centre towards the lake and beyond, where the fighting resumed in a confusing state with shifting luck. The two lines would eventually reach a length of about 2 km (1 mi). Kamensky then launched an attack on the exposed Swedish centre but was checked as Swedish reinforcements came over the stream. (Note: Kamensky wanted to draw the Swedish right wing further out to the west by posing a threat to their flank, to weaken the Swedish centre; he hoped this would be enough to break through to the bridge going over the river, while at the same time isolating the Swedish right flank.) Swedish counterattacks—mainly done by a Jönköping battalion supported by a gun—along the main road towards the Russian artillery in the centre, managed to win ground and temporarily push the Russians back. Wachtmeister failed to organize a concentrated attack to exploit the advance, as his battalions arrived successively while also fighting uphill at a disadvantage of two against three. Deprived from the essential support, the Swedish attacks stranded against the last Russian centre-reserve, but two Russian major generals had already been wounded, one of them mortally.

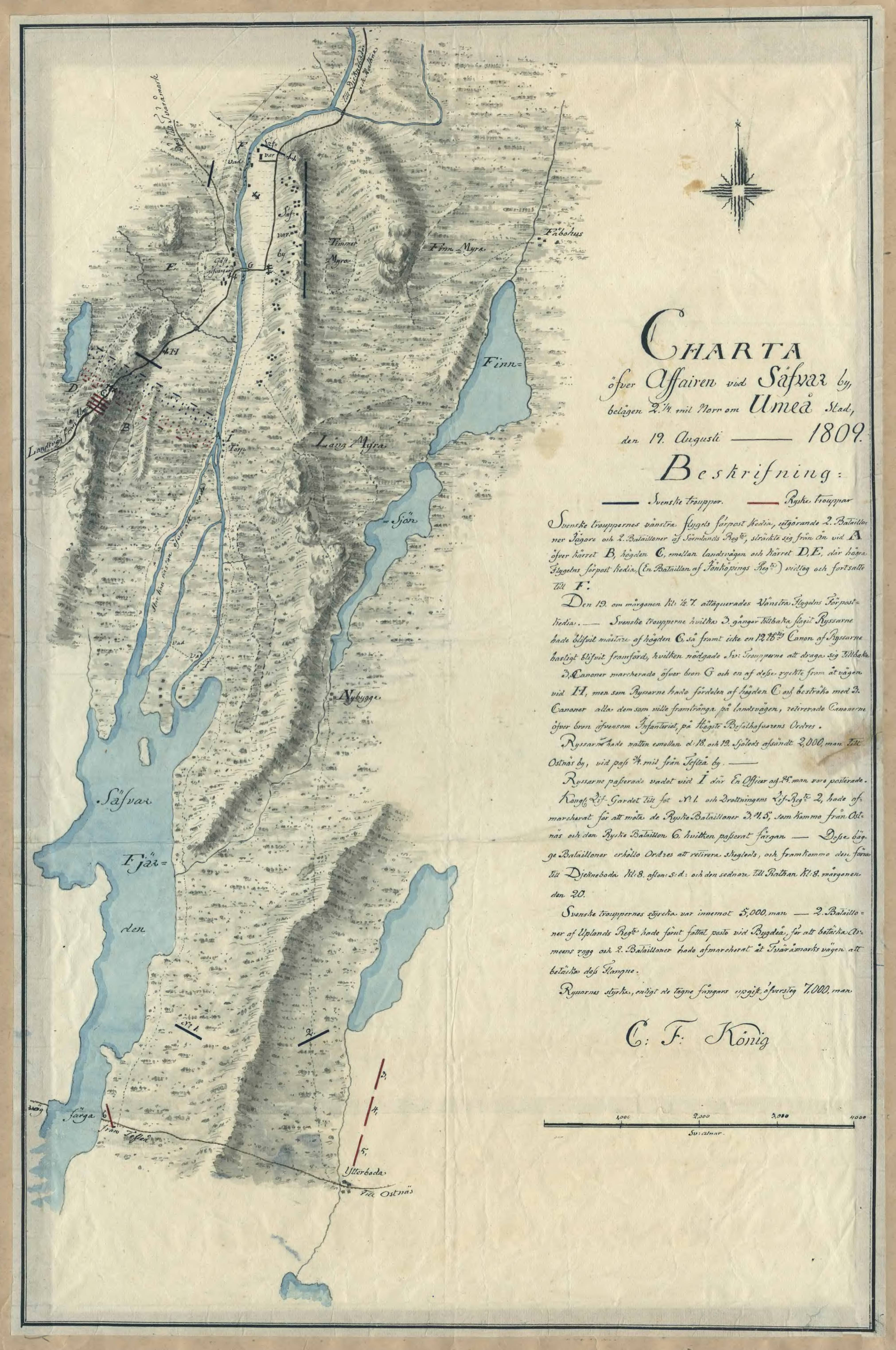
Contemporary map: Sävar, furtherst up (where the river turns); Krutbrånet, to the left (between the river and the lake); Ytterboda, down to the right. By C.F. König

The Russian artillery at Krubrånet completely dominated the battle, as it fired upon the Swedish troops marching across the field towards the heights; the elevated position, however, neglected the chance for their round shot to strike multiple battalions at once. Between 10:00 and 11:00, Wachtmeister ordered additional troops to reinforce the Swedish right, to roll up the Russian left wing all the way to their centre and capture the guns at the summit. A Swedish battalion then suddenly retreated near Krutbrånet, creating a large gap in the line which had to be filled by a Kronoberg battalion, initially instructed to support the right, to prevent a centre collapse. The Russians were repelled, as were two following attacks made by them. Without the necessary support on the right, however, the Russians managed to circumvent the Swedish flank and march into the rear of their enemies, threatening to cut them off from Sävar. At 11:30, Wachtmeister dispatched orders to his battalions near Krutbrånet to withdraw across the river. The lack of ammunition among the battalions was a contributing factor. The battalions withdrew successively, as they received the order, resulting in several rear attacks made by the pursuing Russians. The Swedes established defences in front of Sävar to cover the retreat, while the bridge was broken down and troops waded across the river.

=== Fighting towards Ytterboda ===
At 06:30, Wachtmeister received a report from the Swedish outpost (25 men) observing the ferry in the south, which informed him that a Russian column (600 men) alongside some Cossacks had forced the crossing half an hour earlier. The outpost fought a retreating action for over an hour, until it was reinforced by a Swedish Jäger battalion (250 men) sent by Wachtmeister, which temporary halted the Russian advance. The Russians soon gathered their strength and once again pushed the Swedes in front of them, towards Sävar. At this time, Kamensky dispatched two additional companies (250 men) over the river. After receiving additional reports from the retreating Swedes, Wachtmeister, who thought it had only been a Russian reconnaissance force, committed his elite units—the Queen's battalion followed by the Svea battalion—to their assistance. The two forces fighting towards Ytterboda would thus, so far, be equally matched.

The Swedes marched in a formation resembling a line which stretched all the way to the closest lake (Finnsjön) to the east; around 08:00 the first guard battalion, while assembling the withdrawing Jäger battalion, encountered the enemy about 2.5 km (2 mi) from Sävar, at Finnberget. In their hasty advance, the Swedes endured the enemy fire until they were approximately 10 m (33 ft) away, at which distance they unleashed a volley of their own. The Russians, shaken by the Swedish attack, withdrew south over Finnberget, under fierce fighting. Around 12:00, as the Russians had been pushed behind Ytterboda, the fighting died out as only a few Russians could be seen further ahead, at the river bank. The Swedes marched back to Finnberget to await ammunition, while half of the Jäger battalion was sent back to Sävar with captured Russian soldiers.

Subsequently, however, the Russians turned about and counter-attacked, while three additional companies—which Kamensky had just sent over the river—marched at the Swedish battalions from the back; the left wing of the Queen's battalion (merged with the remaining jäger company) shattered after 15 minutes of desperate fighting, as it was simultaneously hit in both the flank and rear. The Svea battalion then arrived and immediately initiated a bayonet charge which threw the Russians away, after which the two battalions consolidated. At 15:00 they received orders from Wachtmeister to carefully pull back towards Sävar (at this time the Swedish main army had already begun their retreat). The Svea battalion marched off first, while the Queen's battalion remained near Ytterboda for another hour or two, to reassemble dispersed troops. It soon became evident to the Swedes, with Sävar occupied by the enemy, that they were completely cutoff and isolated. The two battalions, largely separated from each other, successfully paved their way through the encirclement with the bayonet and reached the main army at Ratan either late at night or the following day, with about 70 captured Russians.

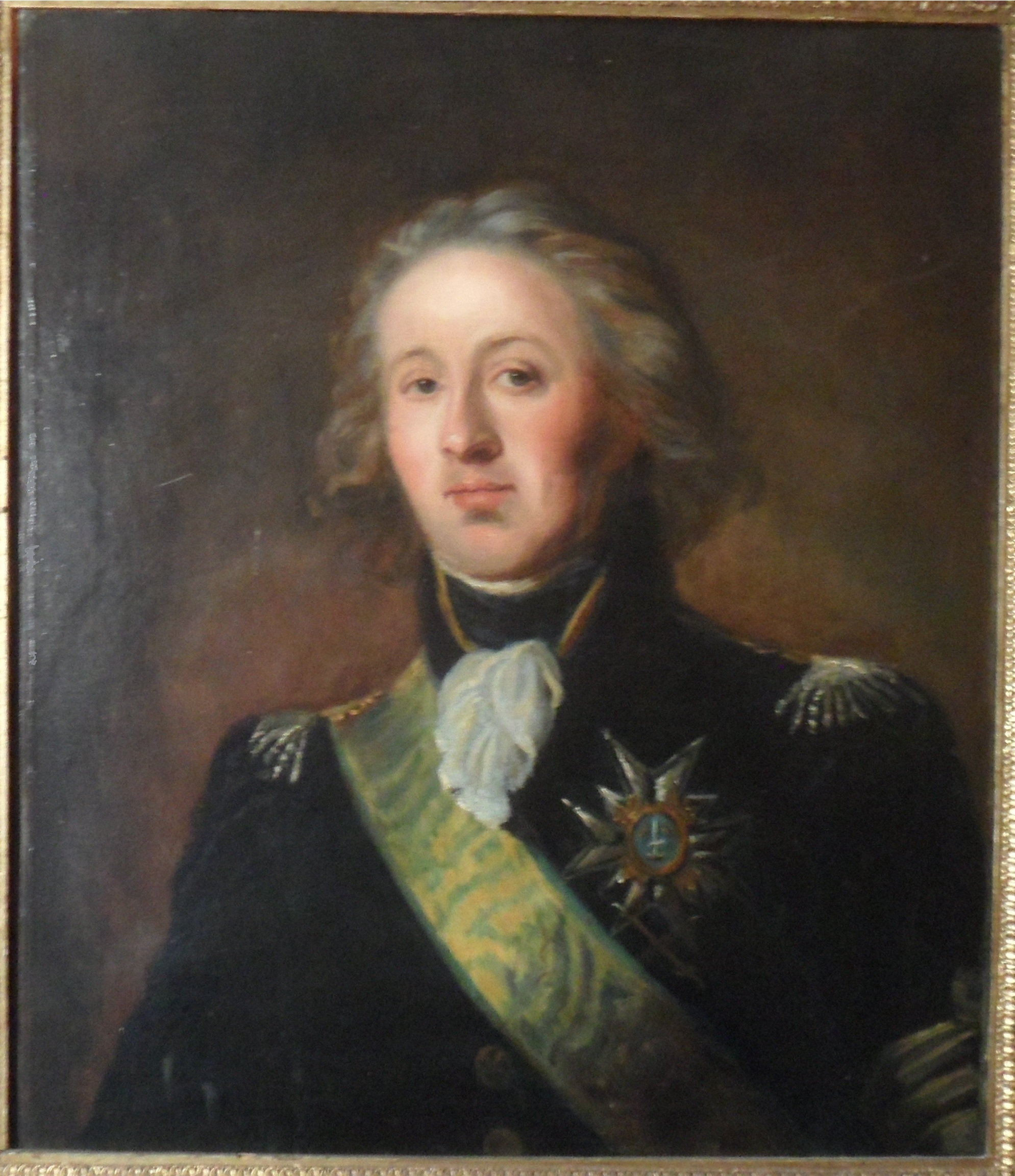
Swedish commander Gustaf Wachtmeister

=== Retreat from Sävar ===
Sometime past 12:00, as Wachtmeister withdrew his forces across the bridge (to the initial Swedish line of defence), Kamensky pushed his army forward to the opposite side of the river bank; the strong Swedish position, with their guns blazing from the heights at Sävar, denied every attempt made by him to cross the river. Kamensky contemplated his next move, for he still had to break through the Swedish lines to escape the trap. He then received intelligence of a wadable—and unguarded—crossing at the river delta (between Sävar and Ytterboda), just before the southern bay. Kamensky sent his last viable reserve of six companies (500–600 men) over the crossing, of which half were ordered towards Sävar, and the others to attack the Swedes near Ytterboda. (Note: A few reports insists that these Russian troops were shipped over to Ostnäs, from Umeå, and that they were much more numerous. This is, however, regarded as very unlikely by most sources. Although, it is possible that this is what was reported to Wachtmeister as he made his ultimate decision to retreat. Johannesson believes that this diversion was ordered before the Swedish withdrawal across the river.) He also stretched his forces further north, along the river, to threaten the Swedish right flank; around 13:00, his jägers occupied the river bank north of Sävar, with its wadable crossing, and started harassing the Swedes who stood ready to defend it.

Meanwhile, a Swedish courier whom Wachtmeister had dispatched south towards Ytterboda—with the orders to withdraw to Sävar—hastily returned and notified the general of the approaching Russians at his left flank. As Wachtmeister turned his left wing to face the southern threat, the Russians, while sustaining heavy losses from canister shot, forced the crossing near the destroyed bridge. While seemingly attacked frontally and in both his flanks, Wachtmeister ordered a general retreat towards Djäkneboda at 14:45. Three Swedish battalions with two guns acted as rearguard and exchanged fire with the Russian forces occupying Sävar, until they likewise withdrew around 16:00. The Russians, apart from some Cossacks, were too bloodied and exhausted to pursue. It has since been the very last pitched battle to be fought in Sweden.

=== Casualties ===
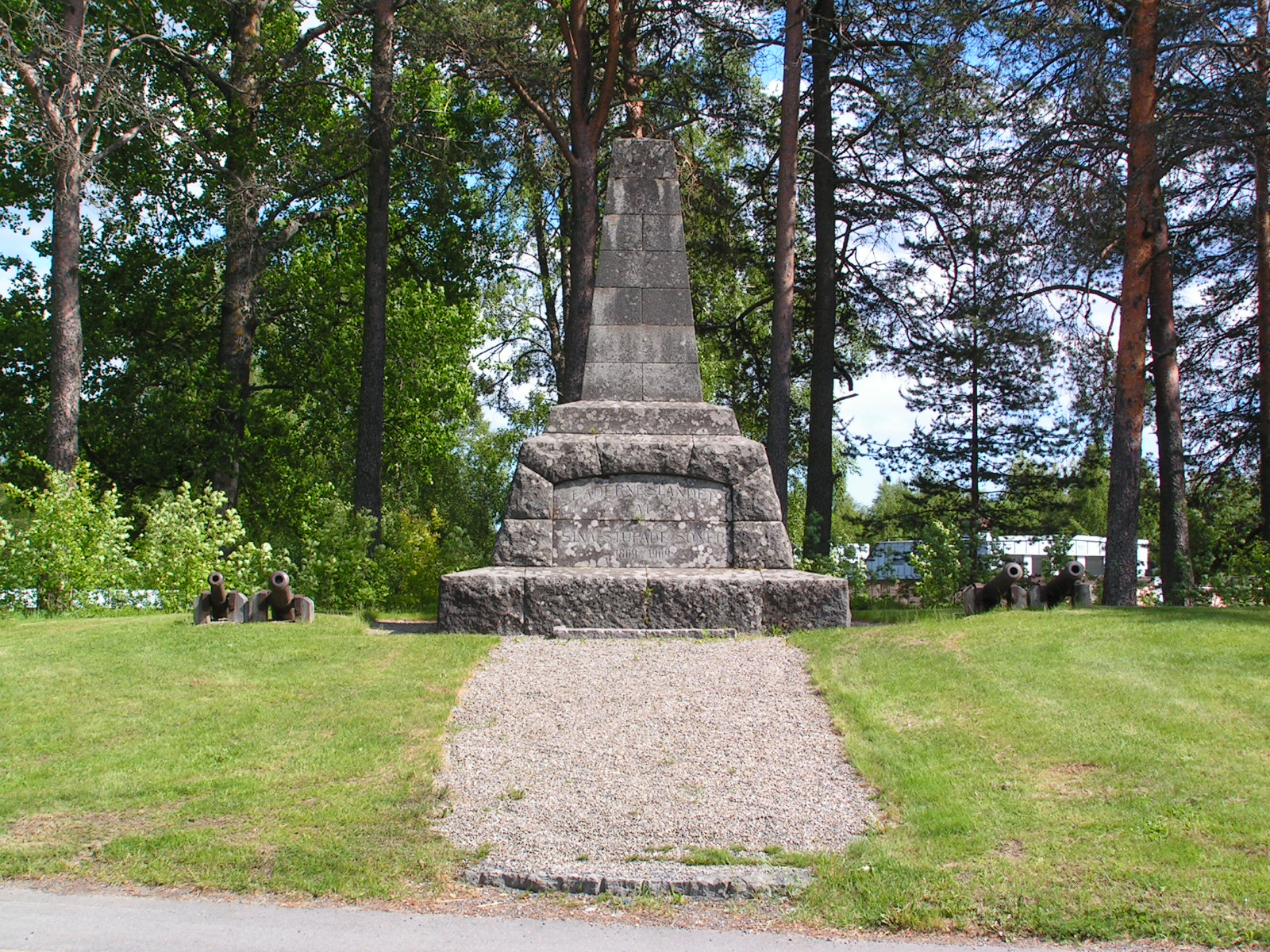
Battle memorial raised in 1909

Generalstaben estimates the Swedish losses at Sävar to about 482 killed or captured (29 officers), and 362 wounded (37 officers); in total, 844 men. Kamensky stated that 265 unharmed Swedes had been captured and that an additional 300 wounded had been "collected at the battlefield"; if the reported number of 270 captured can be considered accurate, a conclusion can be drawn at about 212 Swedes killed. The report of Swedish losses at Sävar—included in Generalstaben's work—however, also occasionally includes losses sustained the following day at Ratan. (Note: The Swedish report mentioned in Generalstaben's work states that 21 men out of the Västmanland Regiment were lost in the battle. In his memorials, however, second lieutenant Carl Johan Ljunggren writes that the regiment only lost nine men at Sävar, with another twelve losses sustained at Ratan—in total, 21 men.) Kamensky, on the other hand, estimated the total Swedish losses to about 2,000 men. The Swedish regimental losses were (from highest to lowest): The Engelbrechten Regiment (141); the Queen's Life Regiment (139); the Södermanland Regiment (136); the Jönköping Regiment (127); the Life Grenadier Regiment (98); the Svea Life Guards (95); the Kronoberg Regiment (46); the Västmanland Regiment (21); the Life Guards of Horse (19); the jägers of the Uppland Regiment (17); the Svea Artillery Regiment (4); the Kalmar Regiment (1).

According to Generalstaben, Kamensky reported his losses as 612 killed (5 officers), 738 wounded (33 officers) and 260 captured (1 officer); in total 1610 men, which includes the casualties sustained at Ratan (estimated by Kamensky as 150); Hornborg, however, believes that the figure of 612 killed Russians should instead be "killed and missing" and that it already accounts for the 260 captured; leaving 1,350 Russian casualties in total. Furthermore, he assumes that no more than 800 Russians were killed or wounded at Sävar which, together with an additional 200 captured, would give a total of about 1,000 losses. Hornborg also believes that the Russian casualty figure at Ratan, presented by Kamensky, is unreliable and that it should undoubtfully be a lot larger; other sources puts these as high as 500–700. In his work on the Finnish War, Alexander Mikhailovsky-Danilevsky gives Kamensky's total losses as: One major general and four officers killed, one major general and 33 officers wounded and no less than 1,500 privates killed or wounded; leaving around 1,389 losses (after excluding the ones lost at Ratan). Other authors believes that the Russians had lost three major generals, about 30 to 40 officers and between 2,000 and 3,000 privates in total during the expedition.

== Aftermath ==
Wachtmeister's decision to retreat, as well as his indecisiveness in the battle, has since been strongly criticised by many: Instead of instantly withdrawing his troops behind the river, he half-heartedly attempted to retake an advantageous position held by the enemy while being heavily outnumbered (2,300–2,800 against 3,850), with only two guns in support against eight; at the decisive moment at Krutbrånet, he still had five battalions in reserve. Once having pulled his forces across the river, Wachtmeister held an advantageous position from where his artillery could finally dominate the field. His final position was, even as the enemy demonstrated against both his flanks, most likely too strong to be taken had he made an effort to defend it. The dissatisfaction after the battle among soldiers and officers was evident—for the army did not feel beaten—only the general. Wachtmeister motivated his decision to retreat with the high amount of losses sustained (perhaps influenced by the king's earlier request for him not to waste the last Swedish reserve). The Russians, on the other hand, had suffered greater losses, but they were led by a general determined to win; despite having the clock against him, Kamensky led an exhausted and hungry army to victory, against all odds.

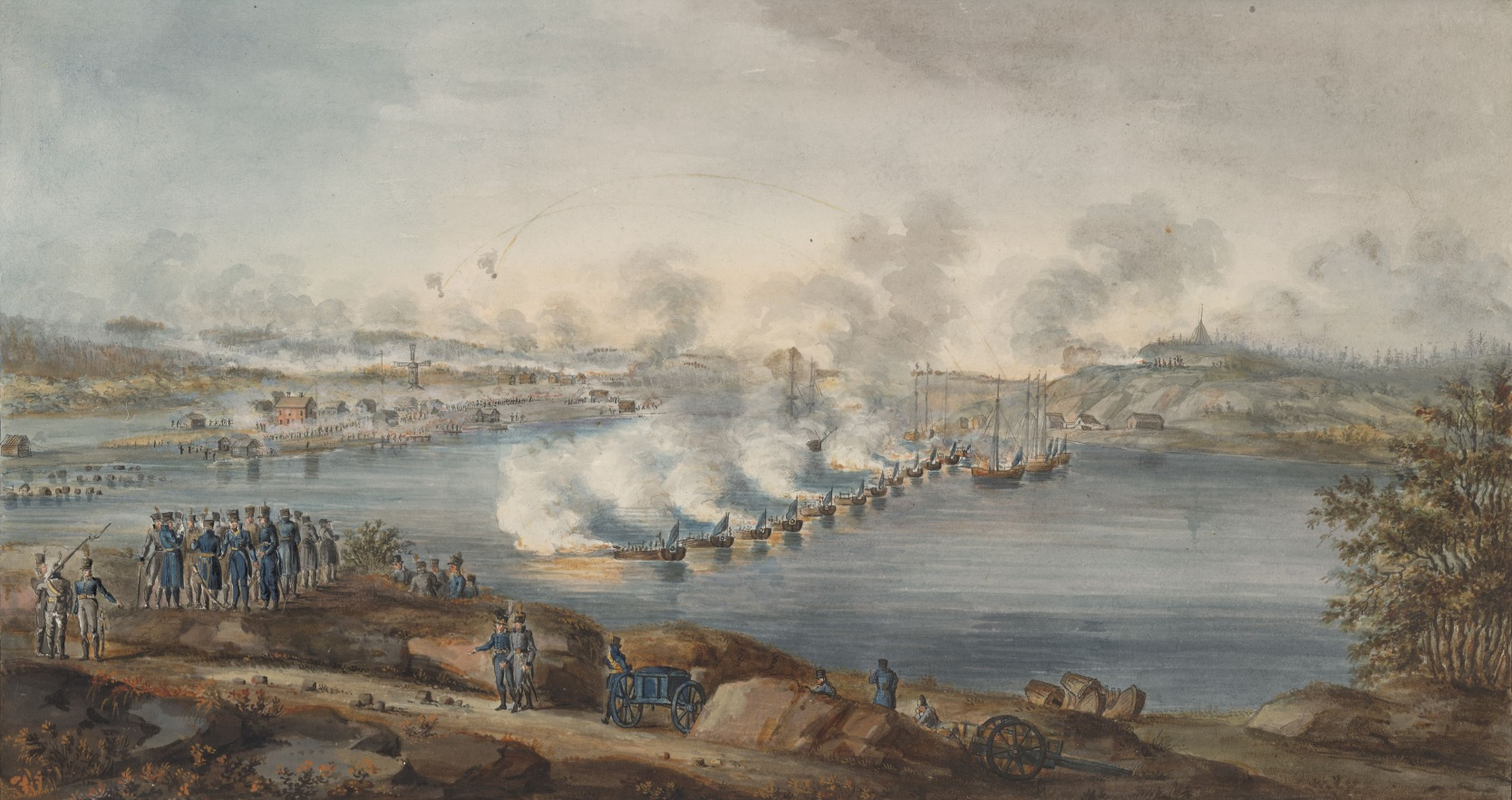
Battle of Ratan, by Carl Gustaf Gillberg

=== Expedition outcome ===
Wachtmeister initially planned to make a stand at Djäkneboda, which was an utmost advantageous position, but he determined that the risk of being outflanked was too great and instead marched on towards Ratan; this enabled the Russians to use the main road to retreat. To cover the Russian retreat north and force the Swedes to embark their ships, Kamensky attacked the following day at 15:00, with about 3,000 men. Wachtmeister, despite having almost 6,000 men at his disposal (excluding the naval personnel), made no serious attempt to counterattack. After five hours of fighting and fruitless negotiations, Kamensky withdrew with his army to Djäkneboda from where he observed Wachtmeister; apart from some minor skirmishing near Djäkneboda, the Swedish army remained idle until the 22nd, when it embarked the fleet. Wrede and Sandels had received word of the Swedish landing at Ratan on the afternoon of the 19th—as the battle of Sävar was already decided—and they set march north towards Umeå the next day; the march went slow since the retreating Russians had destroyed all bridges behind them.

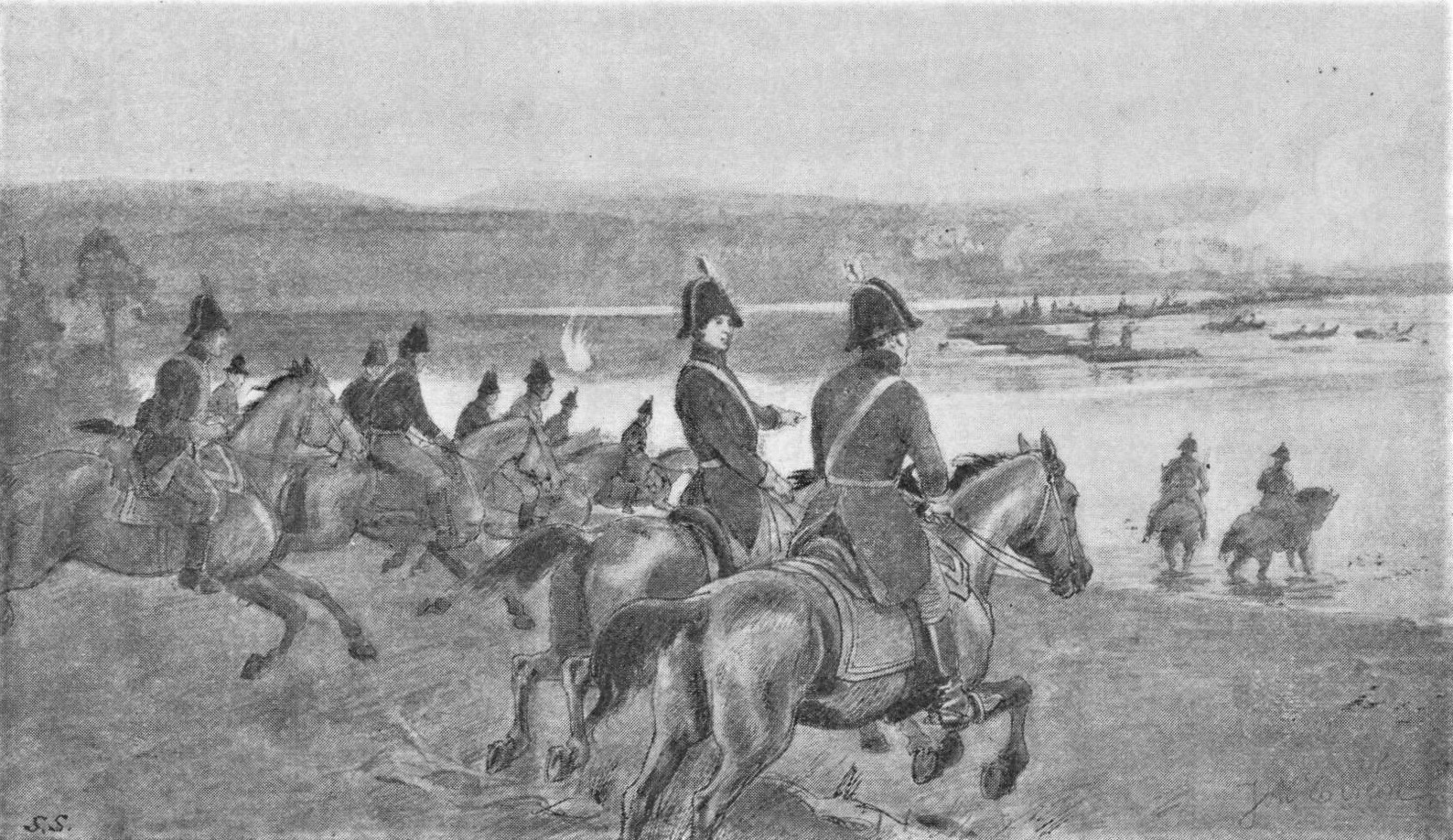
Fabian Wrede at the Ume River, by Johan Tirén

The Swedes reached the Ume River the following day, on the 21st, just as the last Russian battalion was in the process of crossing. A small skirmish occurred, which was followed by an artillery duel across the river. The fighting had cost both sides a little more than ten dead and some wounded. A small Swedish force crossed the river to Umeå and attacked the Russian field hospital, taking some prisoners. On the 22nd, as Wrede made preparations to storm the city, Kamensky ordered a general retreat as he feared being cutoff once again, had Puke landed further north. The last Russian battalion left Umeå on the 23rd and Djäkneboda the following day, after which the retreat continued towards Piteå, where Kamensky arrived on the 29th. Wrede marched into Umeå on the 24th. Instead of immediately sailing north to cut off the Russian retreat, Puke was contented with securing Umeå; Wachtmeister once again disembarked at Ratan on the 28th and marched towards the city, where the fleet likewise sailed the next day. The two forces were thus finally united at the given destination, albeit a little too late.

Even though Kamensky had been temporarily forced out of Västerbotten all the way to Piteå, the expedition had failed to reach its main goal to have the Russian army destroyed; the excessive cautiousness and inadequate coordination displayed between the two Swedish forces was a deciding factor. The expedition had cost the Swedes a total of 1,077 men in dead, wounded or captured, while the Russian casualties reached between 1,539 and 1,610 men. On 25 August, Kamensky fended off a Swedish attack on his fortifications at the Pite River, aimed to cut off his supply lines north. The Swedes lost 23–25 men to 33–50 Russians—it would be the last action of the war. On 2 September, the two sides agreed to an armistice which would be in effect until the Treaty of Fredrikshamn was signed: Sweden ceded its eastern territorium (Finland) all the way from the Torne River, including the Åland Islands; Kamensky's retreat from Västerbotten, which was initially met with disappointment from many of his countrymen, had most likely contributed to Alexander I's softer demands. The peace was followed up by the Treaty of Jönköping, which ended the Dano–Swedish War, and the Treaty of Paris in which Sweden agreed to enter the Continental System against the United Kingdom (while retaining Swedish Pomerania), leading to an inactive war between the two former allies.

== Notes, citations and sources ==
=== Sources ===
- Björlin, Gustaf (1883). Finska kriget 1808 och 1809: läsning för ung och gammal (in Swedish). Stockholm: P.A. Norstedt.
- Ericson, Lars; Hårdstedt, Martin; Iko, Per; Sjöblom, Ingvar; Åselius, Gunnar (2003). Svenska slagfält (in Swedish). Värnamo: Wahlström & Widstrand. ISBN 9789146202257.
- Generalstaben (1922). Sveriges krig åren 1808 och 1809, Volume 9 (in Swedish). Stockholm: Kongl. boktryckeriet P. A. Norstedt & söner.
- Hornborg, Eirik (1955). När riket sprängdes: fälttågen i Finland och Västerbotten, 1808-1809 (in Swedish). Stockholm: P. A. Norstedts och Söners Förlag.
- Johannesson, Bror E. (1959). Ofredens år: Historisk skildring av Kriget i Västerbotten 1809 (in Swedish). Umeå: Bröderna Larsson.
- Ljunggren, Carl Johan (1903). Skildring af krigshändelserna i Öster- och Västerbotten 1808-1809 (in Swedish). Helsinki: Tidnings & tryckeri-aktiebolagets tryckeri.
- Mikhailovsky-Danilevsky, Alexander (1850). Beskrifning öfver Finska kriget till lands och sjös åren 1808 och 1809 (in Swedish). Tavastehus: S. Nordenswan.
- Nordensvan, Carl Otto (1898). Finska kriget 1808-1809 (in Swedish). Stockholm: Albert Bonniers Förlag.
- Palmblad, Vilhelm Fredrik; Wieselgren, Peter; Werner, Karl Fredrik (1852). Biografiskt lexicon öfver namnkunnige svenska män, nittonde bandet (in Swedish). Uppsala: Palmblad och Sebell.
- Sparre, Pehr (1865). Anteckningar rörande Expeditionen åt Westerbotten år 1809 (in Swedish). Stockholm: Albert Bonniers Förlag.
- Swederus, Georg (1871). Expeditionen till Westerbotten 1809 (in Swedish). Stockholm: Militärlitteraturföreningens Förlag.
