= Life Grenadier Regiment =

A Life Grenadier Regiment may refer to:

- Life Regiment Grenadiers (I 3), Swedish military unit
- Life Grenadier Regiment (Sweden) (I 4), Swedish military unit
- 1st Life Grenadier Regiment (Sweden) (I 4), Swedish military unit
- 2nd Life Grenadier Regiment (Sweden) (I 5), Swedish military unit
- Life Grenadier Regiment of the Royal Prussian Guard, once commanded by Hans Sigismund von Lestwitz
- Royal Saxon 1st (Life) Grenadier Guard Regiment (No. 100), of the Royal Saxon Army
- Life-Guards Grenadier Regiment of the Russian Imperial Guard
