= Battle of Ratan =

1809 battle of the Finnish War

- Part of the Västerbotten Swedish army and naval offensive, within the Finnish War
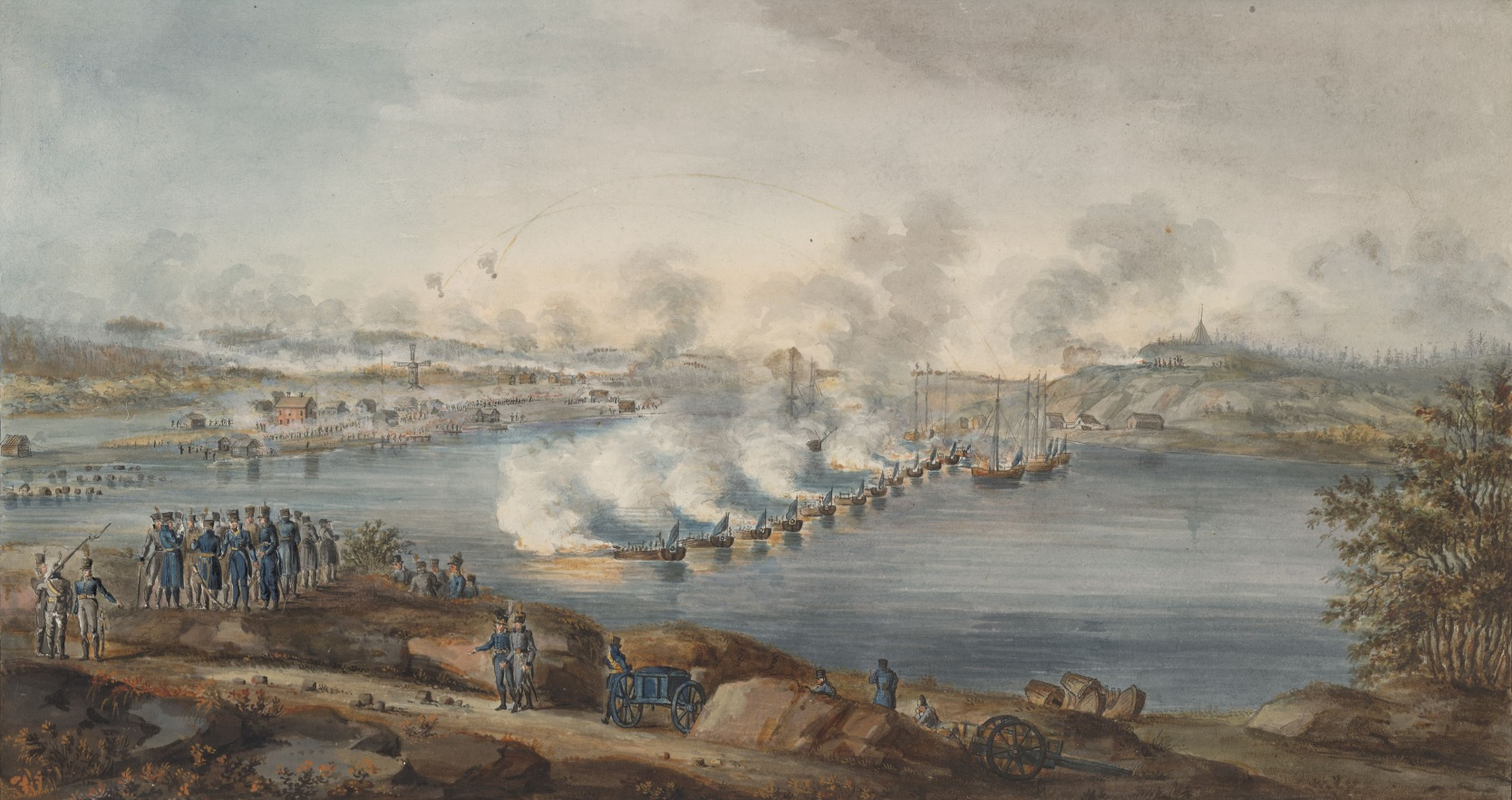
Date	20 August 1809
Location	Ratan, Sweden 63°59′32″N 20°53′52″E
Result	Swedish victory

Belligerents
Sweden	Russian Empire

Commanders and leaders
Gustaf Wachtmeister; Johan af Puke	(Russian Empire) Nikolay Kamensky

Units involved
Flotilla	

Strength
5,420	3,000

Casualties and losses
Swedish accounts: 150–181 Russian accounts: 2,000 (including losses at Djäkneboda and Sävar)	Russian accounts: 150 Swedish accounts: 500–700
- Location within Sweden Battle of Ratan (European Russia)

The Battle of Ratan was fought on 20 August 1809 during the Russo-Swedish War of 1808–09, a day after the Battle of Sävar, and was the last battle fought on Swedish soil during the war. After Russia conquered Finland, the Swedish army command planned a combined attack on the Russian army by landing troops north of Umeå to attack them from the rear while the mainland army advanced from the south.

After defeating the Swedish force at Sävar on 19 August, the Russian army advanced on Ratan, where the Swedes, supported by artillery from the flotilla and the Swedish fleet, held off the Russian advance. The Russians then withdrew north towards Piteå, and Swedish troops reoccupied Umeå.

Although the war ended with Sweden ceding Finland to Russia, the battles of Sävar and Ratan have been argued to have improved Sweden's position in the subsequent peace negotiations, helping to move the border north to the Tornio and Muonio rivers rather than the Kalix River originally demanded by Alexander I of Russia.

== Prelude to the battle ==
The Russians had successfully captured the city of Umeå and driven the Swedish army commanded by Sandels south, to Härnösand. Tsar Alexander I of Russia demanded that Sweden cede all of Finland. To achieve a better negotiating position, the Swedish army command planned to land troops north of the Russian positions in Umeå to attack the Russian army from the rear, while the mainland army of 3,400 men under Fabian Wrede attacked them from the front.

Chosen to lead the sea-borne task force was Lieutenant-General Gustav Wachtmeister. Battle proven in the Prussian Army, in the Russo-Swedish War in 1789–90, and in the Pomeranian War just two years earlier. There was talk on giving the command to von Döbeln, but Wachtmeister was chosen.

There was no threat from the Russians possible on the waters, as the combined force of the Swedish navy and the Royal Navy had the Russian fleet at bay. The task force left Stockholm on 8 August and sailed north towards Ratan 45 km north from Umeå. To avoid detection by the Russian army in Umeå, the task force sailed east of Holmön. It arrived at Ratan 16 August. The attack was planned for 19 August.

The Swedish task force sent was under the command of Admiral Johan af Puke and included the following vessels from both the navy and the archipelago fleet:

- 2 ships of the line (Adolf Fredrik and Försiktigheten)
- 1 frigate (Jarramas)
- 44 gunboats and bomb vessels
- 6 galleys
- 20–40 troop transport ships
- 6,800 soldiers

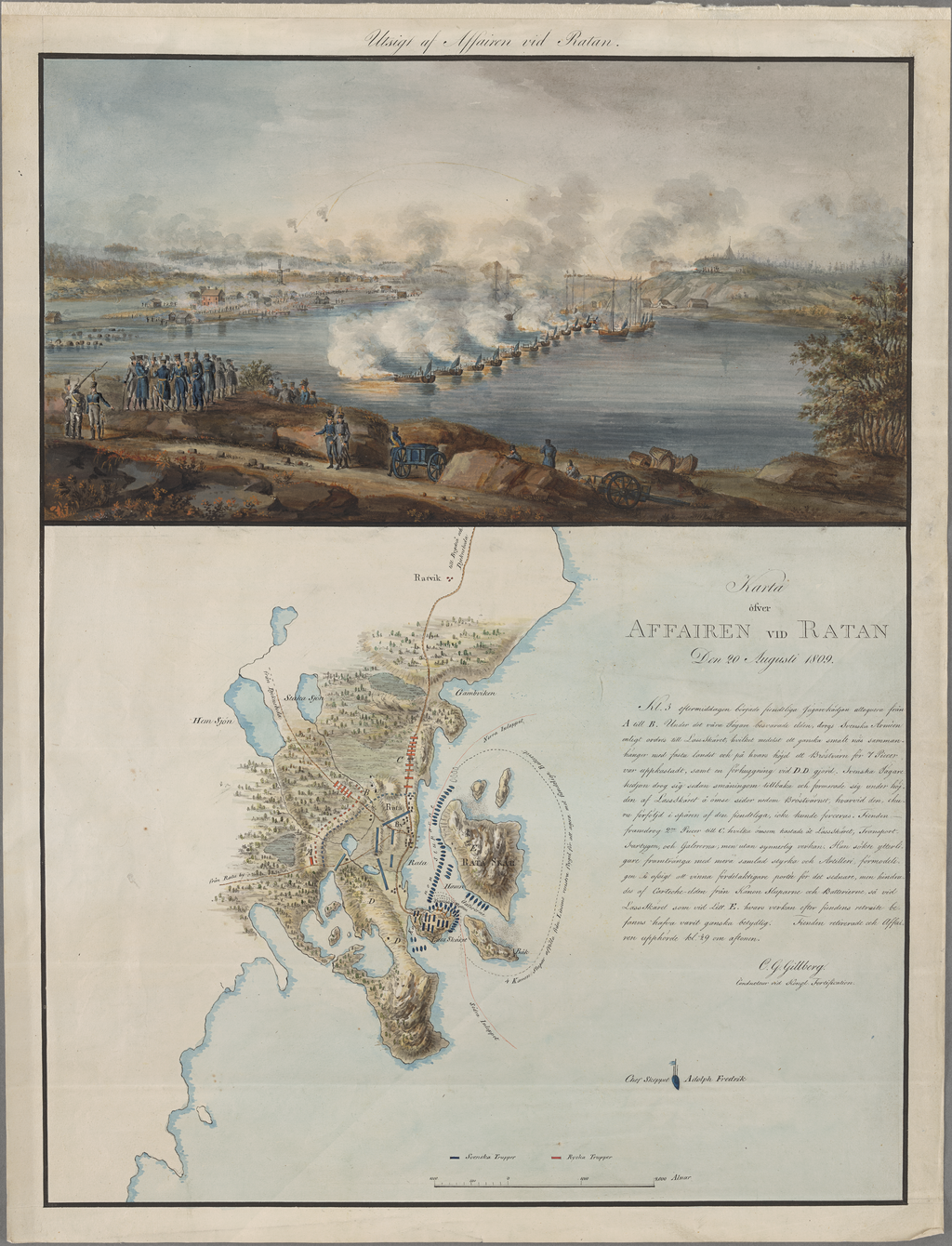
"View and Map of the Affair at Ratan, of 20 August 1809" by Carl Gustaf Gillberg, 1809

On 17 August the Swedish army disembarked from their ships in Ratan. Later the same day, they destroyed a small Russian detachment in Djäkneboda. The Russian commander, Lieutenant-General Nikolay Mikhailovich Kamensky, was marching south when he learned of the Swedish task force. He quickly wheeled around and marched north to face Wachtmeister's army before Wrede's arrived.

The Swedish force under Wachtmeister was delayed at Sävar 20 km north of Umeå. The Russians attacked Wachtmeister's force in Sävar at 07:30 on 19 August. The Russian force took possession of high ground immediately and the Swedes counterattacked the Russians uphill. A fierce battle broke out and despite Swedish success in the fighting, Wachtmeister ordered his forces to retreat back to Ratan. The Battle of Sävar was over at 15:00. Although the Battle of Sävar turned out as a Russian victory, the Russian army was too damaged to dare face Wrede advancing from the south.

At Sävar, Sweden suffered casualties of 396 men dead and around 450 wounded, the Russians suffered around 600 men dead and around 1000 wounded.

== Description of the battle ==
After the Battle of Sävar, the Swedish force fell back to the village of Ratan, in which they immediately prepared for another battle. On 20 August Kamensky ordered his army to attack the Swedes in a delaying battle to secure the Russian supply wagons' retreat north. This time Sweden had support from their artillery, not only the ground-based, but also the cannons loaded on the Swedish fleet. Altogether, around 100 cannons were available for the Swedish army. The artillery barrage destroyed large parts of the village and its surroundings.

During the Battle of Ratan, Wachtmeister, due to support of the flotilla, managed to hold off Kamensky, who afterwards retreated north towards Piteå. Shortly after, Swedish troops entered Umeå.

Casualties at Ratan numbered 150 to 181 Swedes (26 dead, 2 prisoners). About 150 Russians were lost according to Kamensky, while Swedish reports mention 500–700 Russian casualties.

== Aftermath ==
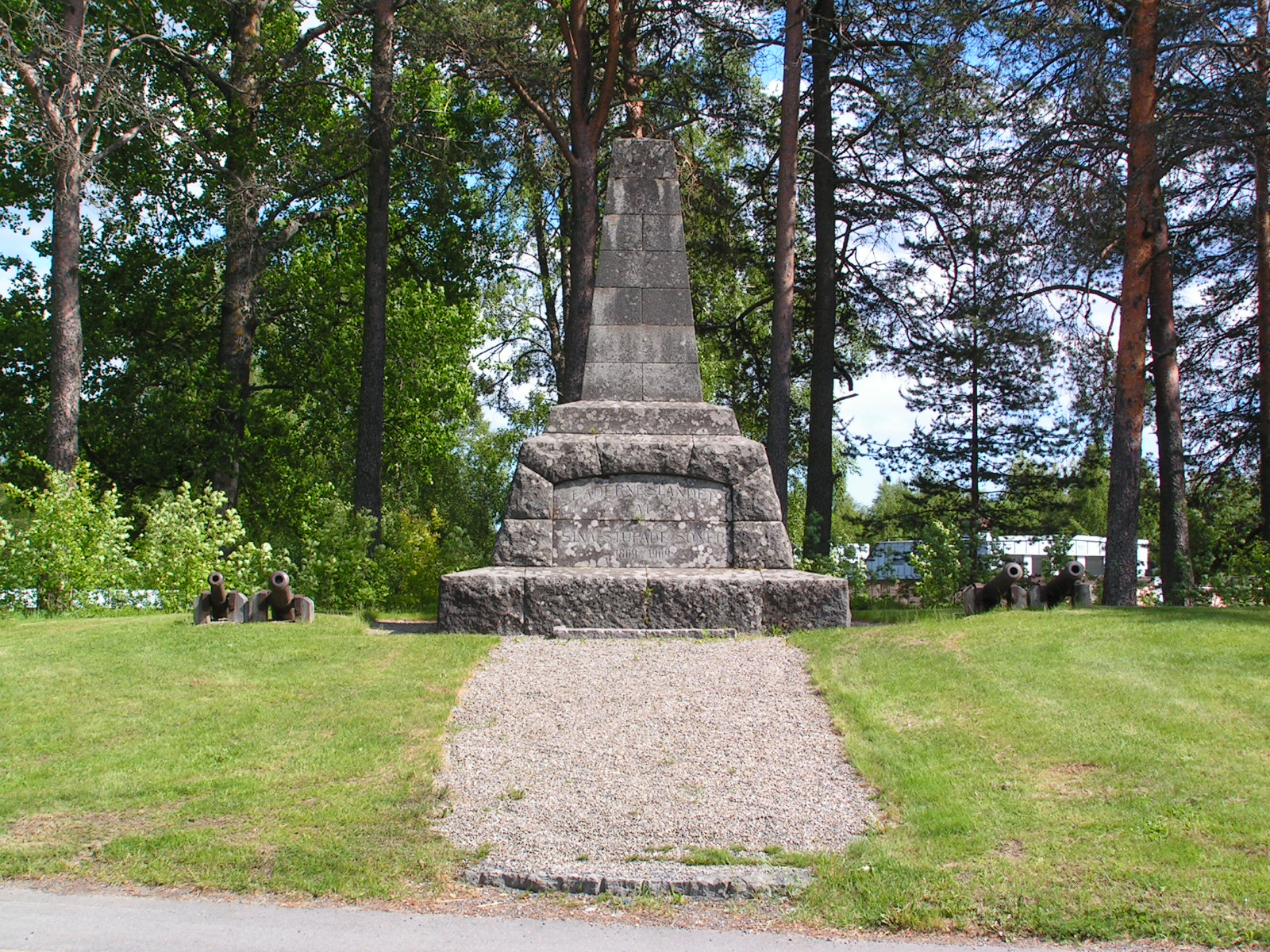
War memorial of Battle of Sävar.

The Russians managed to take Ratan, but then were forced to abandon it due to Swedish flotilla fire. The Russian cannonballs did not reach the Swedish fleet. A forward line of Russian jägers stood in the woods. The Swedish field force was not defeated thanks to the fleet, boarded the ships unhindered, and sailed away to safety. The Russian army could not stay with the enemy advancing from the south having just suffered so many casualties. Instead it retreated north after the battle, easing the situation for the Swedish army. It has also been argued that the outcomes of the battles helped Sweden to achieve a better position in the peace negotiations with Russia. Emperor Alexander of Russia had demanded all of Österland, Åland, the parts of Norrland in present-day Finland and parts of Norrland in present-day Sweden. The Emperor's demand was for the border to be drawn at the Kalix River. The engagements in Sävar and Ratan have been argued to have helped move the border north to the Tornio and Muonio rivers in the peace talks.

Having the border further north than demanded by the Russians in the initial talks turned out to be fortunate for Sweden in the long run as major findings of iron ore were discovered in these areas later.
