= Hans Leonard Svedenhielm =

Hans Leonard Svedenhielm was a colonel of the Kingdom of Sweden. In 1788, at the Battle of Valkeala, the general led the main attack of the Swedish troops against the Russian forces.
