= Fabian Wrede (1760–1824) =

Swedish field marshal

Count Fabian Wrede
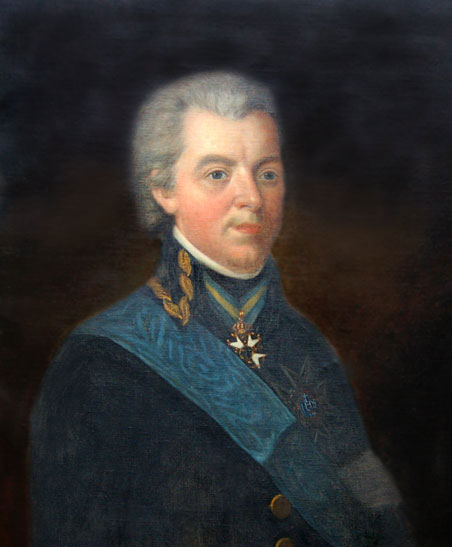
- Portrait of Fabian Wrede
- Born: November 24, 1760; Stockholm, Sweden
- Died: January 16, 1824 (aged 63); Stockholm, Sweden
- Burial place: Julita Church cemetery, Södermanland County
- Education: Uppsala University
- Spouses: Marie Stanislas Josefine Sparre (m. 1780; div. 1796) Agata Bremer (m. 1798; died 1810)
- Children: Count Fabian Ernst Wrede; Adelaide Wrede; Agata Wrede; Charlotta Ottiliana Wrede; Fabian Jakob Wrede; Sigrid Henrietta Wrede; Casper Wrede
- Relatives: Fabian Casimir Wrede (father)
- Military career
- Allegiance: Sweden; Kingdom of France (1778–1780)
- Branch: Swedish Army
- Service years: 1770–1813
- Rank: Field Marshal
- Units: Life Guards (Sweden); Royal-Suédois (French service)
- Commands: Uppland Regiment; Pori Regiment; Nyland Brigade; Life Grenadier Regiment; Northern Swedish Army
- Known for: Prominent supporter of electing Jean-Baptiste Bernadotte to the Swedish throne
- Conflicts: Russo-Swedish War (1788–1790); Landing at Brakila; Cannonade of Fredrikshamn; Battle of Sutela; Battle of Storabborfors; Battle of Högfors; Pomeranian War; Affair at Seemuhl; Siege of Stralsund; Finnish War; Battle of Ratan
- Awards: Lord of the Realm (1811); Knight and Commander of the King's Orders (RoKavKMO) (1796); Knight of the Order of the Sword (RSO) (1789)
- Other work: Master of Ceremonies for the Royal Orders (1790); Envoy Extraordinary to Paris (1810); Chancellor of the Military Academy Karlberg (1810–1812); Royal Councilor (Statsråd) (1810–1812)

Count Fabian Wrede (24 November 1760 – 16 January 1824) was a Swedish field marshal. He began a military career at an early age, spent two years in the Royal Swedish Regiment in France, and made the acquaintance of the Swedish King Gustav III in 1788. The king took a liking to Wrede, who subsequently was rapidly promoted. He participated in all the major operations of the Russo-Swedish War and participated in the attempt by Gustav III and Axel von Fersen the Younger to rescue the French royal family after the French Revolution.

During the Pomeranian War in 1807, he commanded a division but was relieved of duty by Gustav IV Adolf for "outspokenness". After the king was deposed in a coup d'état, he was reinstated in active duty and fought during the final stages of the Finnish War and participated in the Battle of Ratan. After the end of the war, he was dispatched on a diplomatic mission to France, where he became a supporter of Jean-Baptiste Bernadotte as a candidate for the Swedish throne. In 1811 he retired, due to old age and declining health.

== Biography ==
Fabian Wrede started his military career early and entered the Life Regiment of Horse as a cornet in 1775. After a brief stint as a student at Uppsala University, he was promoted to lieutenant in 1777. The years 1778–1780 he served in the Royal Swedish Regiment in France, and then stayed on in Paris to serve at the Swedish embassy. He was dispatched to meet King Gustav III in Spa, during the Grand Tour of the monarch. The king developed a liking for Wrede, who subsequently enjoyed a rapid set of promotions, first within the royal court and in 1788 he was promoted to commander of the Uppland Regiment.

In this capacity he participated in all the major operations of the Russo-Swedish War, was promoted to the adjutant general of the king in 1789, and after the end of the war in 1791 commander of the Nyland Brigade. The same year he accompanied the king to Aachen, during the attempted intervention of Gustav III and Axel von Fersen the Younger to rescue the French royal family, that had been deposed during the French Revolution. The attempt however failed, and the year later the king was assassinated.

Wrede remained highly valued by the regent, the future king Charles XIII, and initially also by King Gustav IV Adolf. Wrede was promoted to major general in 1795, was given command of the Life Grenadier Regiment in 1798, and in 1805 promoted to lieutenant general. During the Pomeranian War, he commanded a division during 1807, but was relieved of duty by Gustav IV Adolf for "outspokenness", after having argued against the king's military orders. Following the Finnish War and the subsequent coup d'état against Gustav IV Adolf, Wrede was reinstated as commander of the army forces in Norrland, with the aim to guard against a possible Russian incursion into mainland Sweden. In this capacity he participated at the Battle of Ratan.

In 1810, Wrede was sent on a diplomatic mission to Paris, and subsequently became involved in the movement to make Jean-Baptiste Bernadotte new king of Sweden. He became one of Bernadotte's main supporters. The following year, Wrede however retired from all his duties due to old age and declining health. He was promoted to Swedish field marshal in 1816, in recognition of his service to the country. He died in on 16 January 1824, in Stockholm.

== Awards and decorations ==
- Knight, Order of the Seraphim (1796)

== Sources cited ==
- Dahl, Torsten, ed. (1948). Svenska män och kvinnor. Biografisk uppslagsbok [Swedish men and women. Biographical dictionary] (in Swedish). Vol. 8. Stockholm: Albert Bonnier. OCLC 4629338.
- Hofberg, Herman; Heurlin, Frithiof; Millqvist, Viktor; Rubenson, Olof, eds. (1906). Svenskt biografiskt handlexikon [Swedish biographical handbook] (in Swedish). Vol. 2. Stockholm: Bonniers. OCLC 474064019.
- Rosander, Lars (2003). Sveriges fältmarskalkar [The field marshals of Sweden] (in Swedish). Lund: Historiska media. ISBN 91-89442-05-9.
