= Gustaf Wachtmeister =

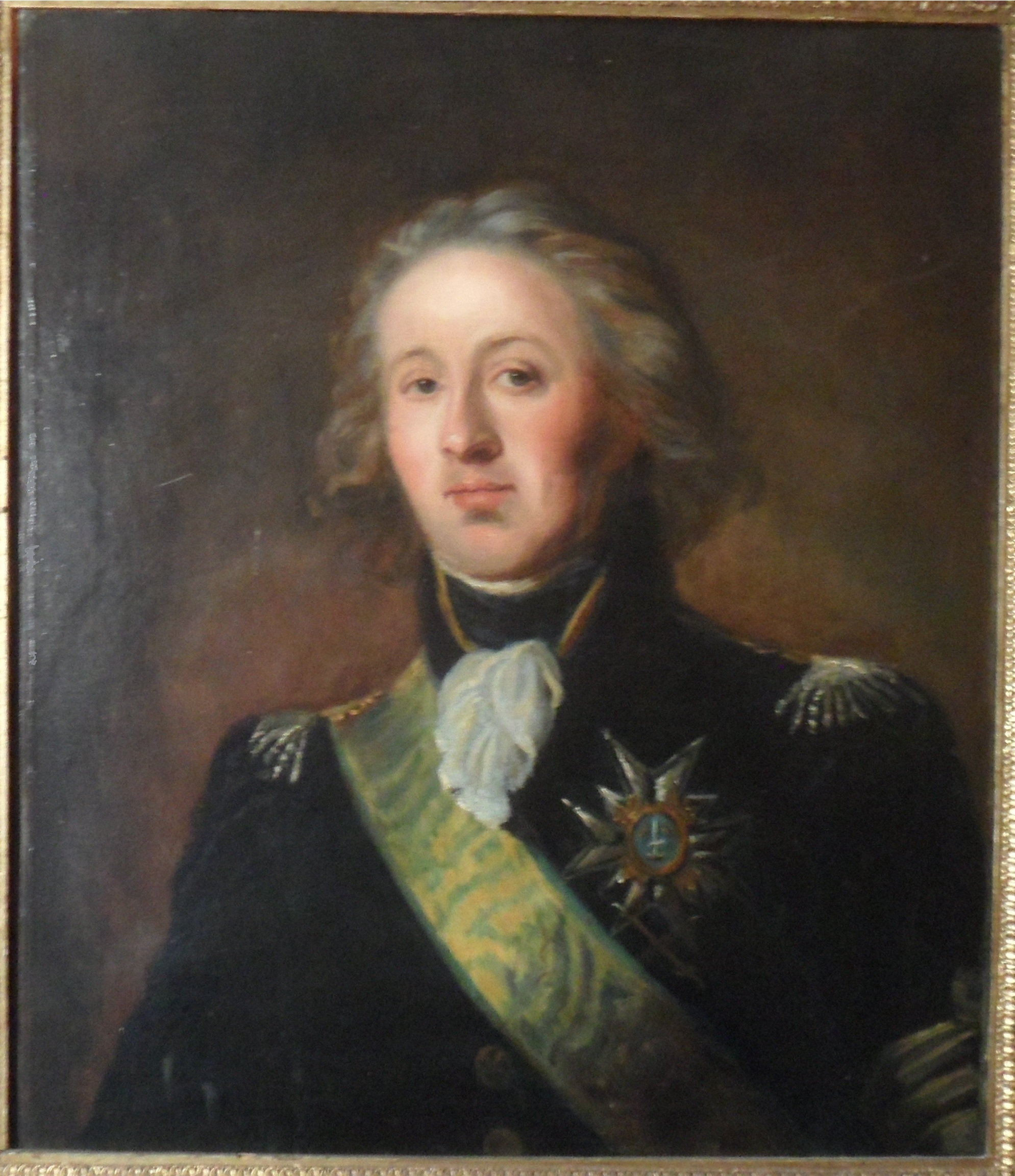
- Portrait of Wachtmeister
- Born: 25 July 1757; Karlskrona, Sweden
- Died: 20 July 1826 (aged 68); Nääs säteri, Sweden
- Military career
- Allegiance: Sweden; (Kingdom of Prussia) Prussia (1778–1779)
- Branch: Swedish Army
- Service years: 1770–1809
- Rank: General
- Nickname: The King's Right Arm
- Conflicts: War of the Bavarian Succession; Russo-Swedish War; Battle of Valkeala; Finnish War; Battle of Sävar; Battle of Ratan

Gustaf Wachtmeister (25 July 1757 – 20 July 1826) was a Swedish Army officer made famous at the Battle of Valkeala in Finland in 1789 against Russia where he was wounded by a musket shot to his arm, which had to be amputated. He was made the hero of the hour by King Gustav III who was in desperate need of publicity as he tried to silence domestic opposition with a crushing victory over Russia.

== Military career ==
Wachtmeister was born into an aristocratic Swedish family in 1757 and embarked on military life at a young age, receiving a commission as an ensign in 1772. In 1778 he went abroad to gain experience on campaign, joining the Prussian Army fighting Austria in the War of the Bavarian Succession from 1778 to 1779.

Returning to Sweden, by 1780 Wachtmeister had a posting as a lieutenant-colonel commanding a battalion in the provincial Dalarna Regiment. He went on to fight against Russia at the Battle of Valkeala and in numerous others until the war ended in 1790 without any real gain for either country.

His later battles were mainly fought against Napoleon in Pomerania and against Russia who in 1809 invaded Sweden after a military coup overthrew the current King Gustav IV. The new King Charles XIII ordered Wachtmeister to attack the Russians behind enemy lines which he did at the battles of Sävar and Ratan.

== Personal life ==
After the battles of Ratan and Sävar during which he retreated his men back to the coast, where they were sheltered by naval guns, he was considered to have not acted with sufficient boldness by his superiors, and was given the option to retire voluntarily to his estates. He died in 1826, at age of 68 years, five days before his 69th birthday.

== Bibliography ==
- David, Saul War From Ancient Egypt to Iraq, Dorling Kindersley, 2009.
