= Battle of Valkeala =

- Part of the Russo-Swedish War (1788–90)
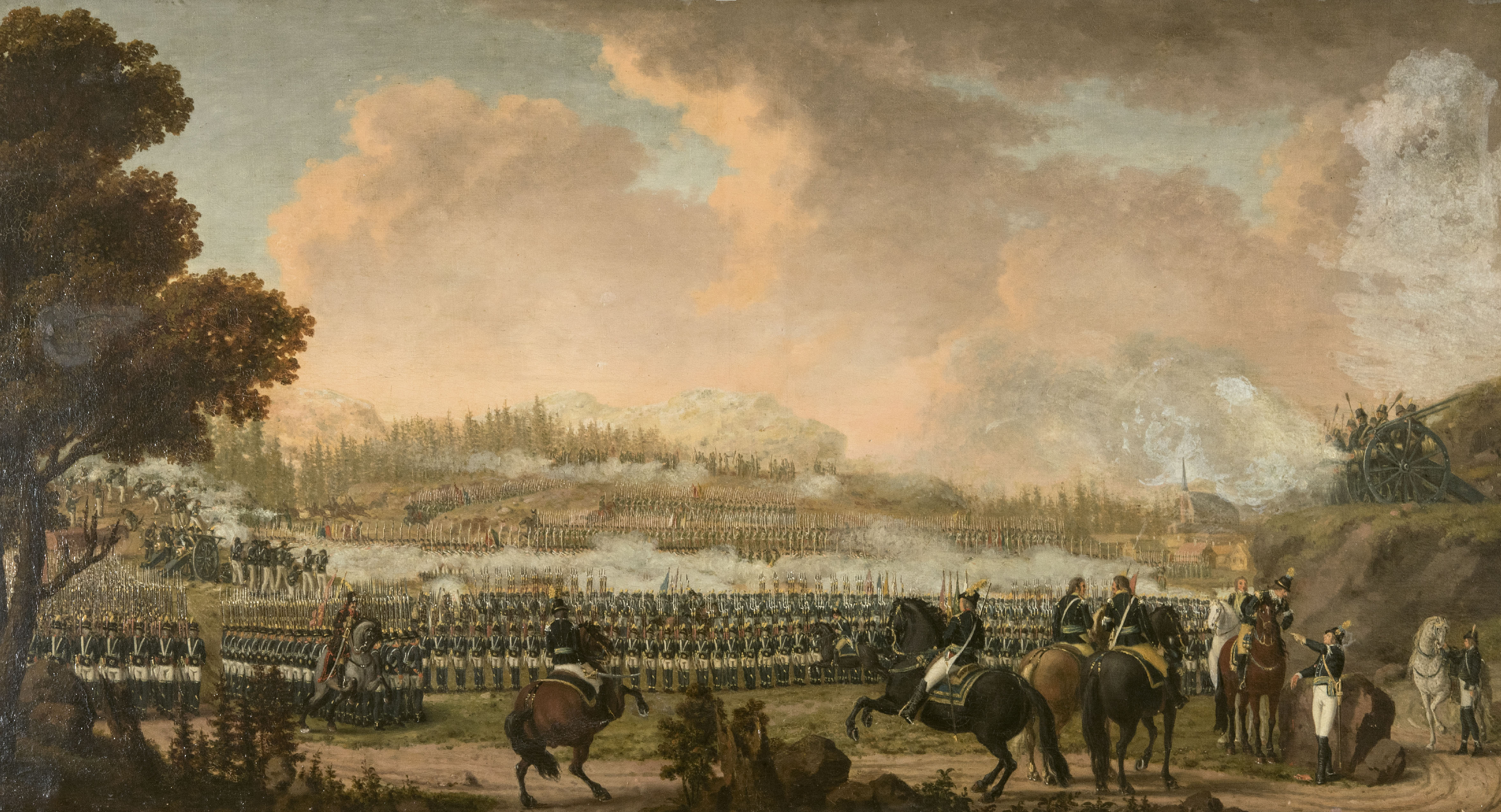
- Battle of Valkeala, by Pehr Hilleström
Date	28 April – 5 May 1790
Location	Valkeala, Finland
Result	Swedish victory

Belligerents
Sweden	Russian Empire

Commanders and leaders
Gustav III (WIA); Gustaf Wachtmeister (WIA)	Fyodor Denisov

Strength
4,000 men	Unknown, but less than the Swedes

Casualties and losses
13 killed 137 wounded	50 killed 70 wounded 40 captured

The battle of Valkeala took place in Gustav III's Russian War April 29, 1790 at Valkeala in Kymenlaakso in Southern Finland and ended with a Swedish victory.

== Context ==
On April 28, 1790, a Swedish army corps of 4000 men under the command of Gustav III and several of his closest officers crossed the Kymi River in Pörille village, at a hastily struck bridge over a ford. The next day, they continued their march to Valkeala, where a Russian force, less than the Swedes stood ready to face them. The Swedish force available for battle consisted of 4,000 men, since 3 battalions had been diverted to guard the ford crossing and rear positions.

The Swedes were victorious in the following battle, pressing home the victory with several successful head-on bayonet charges. After Colonel Swedenhjelm's adversity through Anjala on May 5, the Army Corps of Keltis returned the Kymi river. Swedish units involved included the Västmanland Regiment, Östergötland Infantry Regiment, Life Grenadier Regiment, 1st Life Grenadier Regiment and Kronoberg Regiment.

The Swedes had 13 killed and 137 wounded of the lower rank soldiers (of which 9 killed and 68 wounded from the Kronoberg, 4 killed and 49 wounded from the Västmanland, 13 wounded from the Östgöta regiments and the rest attributed to the Jägers, dragoons and artillery) and 1 killed and 20 wounded of the higher rank, including both Gustav Wachtmeister who had been shot in his arm and the king himself who had suffered a light contusion in his arm. Left on the battlefield there were 50 Russians killed and 70 wounded with another 40 unharmed captives of the lower rank. Additionally two higher ranked officers had been killed with another two captured. The total casualties of the Russians are unknown, many may have been brought with them as they retreated, however, it is said that their Jeager battalion had 317 at the beginning of the battle, but only 60 remained as they retreated. The Swedes captured a large bulk of supplies left by the retreating Russians.

== Aftermath ==
Wachtmeister was the hero of the hour for a king who wished for good publicity. Wachtmeister was made a Major-General for his heroic intervention.
