= Sävar River =

Coordinates: 64.27478°N 20.20834°E

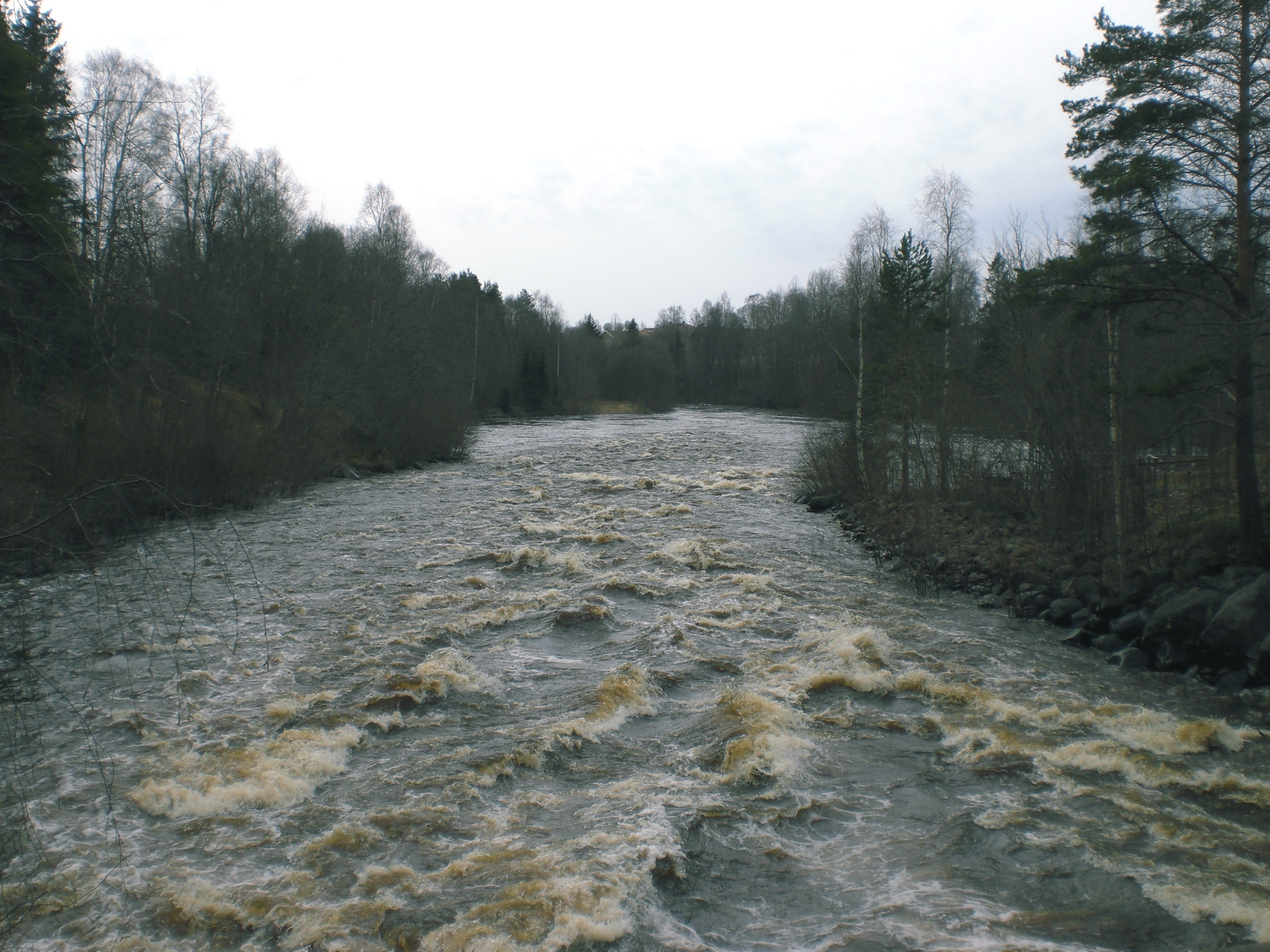
- Native name: Sävarån (Swedish)

Location
- Country: Sweden
- County: Västerbotten

Physical characteristics
- Length: 140 km (87 mi)
- Basin size: 1,161.3 km^{2} (448.4 sq mi)
- Discharge
  - average: 14 m^{3}/s (490 cu ft/s)

Sävar River (Swedish: Sävarån) is a river in Sweden.
