= Västmanland Regiment =

Swedish Army infantry regiment

Coordinates: 59°36′28″N 16°34′34″E

- Västmanlands regemente
- Active: 1626–1709; 1709–1713; 1713–1927; 1994–1997
- Country: Sweden
- Allegiance: Swedish Armed Forces
- Branch: Swedish Army
- Type: Infantry
- Size: Regiment
- Part of: 4th Military District (1833–1893); 5th Military District (1893–1893); 5th Army Division (1893–1901); V Army Division (1902–1927); Middle Military District (1994–1997)
- Garrison/HQ: Västerås
- Colors: Blue and red (uniform, to 1690)
- March: "Prinz Friedrich Carl-Marsch" (Bilse) (Note: The march was adopted in the late-1800s. It was used by the Västmanland Wing from 1943 to 1983 and by Västmanland Regiment from 1994 to 1997.)
- Battle honours: Narva (1700), Düna (1701), Kliszów (1702), Fraustadt (1706), Helsingborg (1710), Gadebusch (1712), Valkeala (1790)

The Västmanland Regiment (Swedish: Västmanlands regemente), designations I 18 and Fo 48, was a Swedish Army infantry regiment that traced its origins back to the 16th century. It was disbanded for the first time in 1927 but later reraised and disbanded again in 1997. The regiment's soldiers were originally recruited from the province of Västmanland, and it was later garrisoned there.

== History ==
The regiment has its origins in fänikor (companies) raised in Västmanland in the 1550s and 1560s. In 1617, these units—along with fänikor from the nearby provinces of Dalarna and Uppland—were organised by Gustav II Adolf into Upplands storregemente, of which six of the total 24 companies were recruited in Västmanland. Upplands storregemente consisted of three field regiments, of which Västmanland Regiment was one. Sometime around 1623, the grand regiment was permanently split into three smaller regiments, of which Västmanland Regiment was one.

The regiment was officially raised in 1628 although it had existed since 1623. Västmanland Regiment was one of the original 20 Swedish infantry regiments mentioned in the Swedish constitution of 1634. The regiment's first commander was Bengt Bagge. It was allotted in 1682 as one of the first regiments to be so.

The regiment was given the designation I 18 (18th Infantry Regiment) in a general order in 1816. Västmanland Regiment was garrisoned in Västerås from 1906. The regiment was disbanded in 1927, but was reorganised in 1994 as a local defence district with the designation Fo 48, although disbanded again just three years later in 1997.

== Campaigns ==
- The Polish War (1600–1629)
- The Thirty Years' War (1630–1648)
- The Northern Wars (1655–1661)
- The Scanian War (1674–1679)
- The Great Northern War (1700–1721)
- The Hats' Russian War (1741–1743)
- The Seven Years' War (1757–1762)
- The Gustav III's Russian War (1788–1790)
- The Finnish War (1808–1809)
- The War of the Sixth Coalition (1813–1814)

== Organisation ==
1634(?)

- Livkompaniet
- Överstelöjtnantens kompani
- Majorens kompani
- Bergslags kompani
- Strömsholms kompani
- Väsby kompani
- Salbergs kompani
- Kungsörs kompani

1814(?)

- Livkompaniet
- Folkare kompani
- Väsby kompani
- Salbergs kompani
- Västerås kompani
- Strömsholms kompani
- Bergs kompani
- Kungsörs kompani

== Heraldry and traditions ==
=== Colours, standards and guidons ===
The regiment was presented with its last colours (two battalion colours) in 1859 (m/1859), which it received at Ladugardsgärdet in Stockholm. It was used until the regiment was disbanded in 1927. The colour came after a government decision to be used by the Västmanland Wing (F 1). Västmanland Wing took over the colour on 26 September 1943, which also included the regimental battle honours, and it then became Sweden's only air force wing with battle honours on its colour. The colour was used until Västmanland Wing was disbanded in 1983.

The new regiment which was raised on 1 July 1994, sought its traditions Västmandland Regiment which was disbanded in 1927. However, the regiment did not inherit the 1859 colour, but received a new colour. The colour was presented to the Västmanland Regiment (Fo 48) in Västerås by the Chief of the Army, lieutenant general Åke Sagrén in 1994. It was used as regimental colour by Fo 48 until 1 September 1997. The colour was drawn by Ingrid Lamby and embroidered by machine in insertion technique by Gunilla Hjort. Blazon: "On white cloth the provincial badge of Västmanland; a threepointed blue mountain, flamed proper. On a blue border at the upper side of the colour, battle honours (Narva 1700, Düna 1701, Kliszów 1702, Fraustadt 1706, Helsingborg 1710, Gadebusch 1712, Valkeala 1790) in white."

=== Coat of arms ===
The coat of the arms of the Västmanland Regiment (Fo 48) 1994–1997 and the Västmanland Group (Västmanlandsgruppen) 1997–2004. Blazon: "Argent, the provincial badge of Västmanland, a three-pointed mountain azure, flammant proper. The shield surmounted two muskets in saltire or".

=== Medals ===
In connection with the disbandment of Uppsala and Västmanland Defence District on 30 June 2000, the Uppland-Västmanlands försvarsområdes minnesmedalj ("Uppland-Västmanland Defence District Commemorative Medal") in silver (UpplVästmlfoMSM) was established. In 2005, the Västmanlands regementes minnesmedalj ("Västmanland Regiment Commemorative Medal") in silver (VästmanlfoMSM) was established.

=== Heritage ===
After the regiment was disbanded in 1997, the regimental traditions was passed on to the Västmanland Group (Västmanlandsgruppen). From 1 July 2013, the traditions are continued by the Västmanland Battalion (Västmanlandsbataljonen) within the Uppland and Västmanland Group (Västmanlandsbataljonen).

=== Other ===
The regimental march was "Prinz Friedrich Carl-March". After the regiment was disbanded, the march was taken over by the Västmanland Wing. However, it came to be titled "Kungl Västmanlands regementes marsch". When the new regiment was raised in 1994, the march regained its original title.

== Commanding officers ==
Regimental commander active from 1628 to 1997.

- 1628–16??: Bengt Bagge
- 1631–1634: Johan Lilliehöök af Fårdala
- 1634–16??: Erik Stenbock
- 1656–1658: William Philp
- 1667–1668: Erik Leijonhielm
- 1668–1677: Thomas van der Noot
- 1678–1693: Peter Creimers
- 1699–1716: Axel Sparre
- 1710–1710: Gustaf Johan Tunderfelt (acting) †
- 1712–1713: Melker Falkenberg (acting)
- 1714–1716: Carl Breitholtz
- 1716–1720: Bernhard Reinhold von Delwig (acting)
- 1720–1728: Axel Sparre
- 1728–1739: Gustaf Fredrik von Rosen
- 1739–1747: Otto Christian von der Pahlen
- 1747–1770: Samuel Gustaf Stierneld
- 1770–1771: Gustaf Adolf von Siegroth
- 1771–1773: Jonas Cronstedt
- 1773–1780: Fredrik Arvidsson Posse
- 1773–1780: Prince Frederick Adolf (acting)
- 1780–1803: Prince Frederick Adolf
- 1780–1785: Wilhelm Mauritz Pauli (Executive officer)
- 1788–1790: Jakob Gripensvärd, sekundchef
- 1790–1803: Lars Stiernstam, sekundchef
- 1804–1804: Lars Stiernstam
- 1804–1809: Adolf Ludvig von Friesendorff
- 1810–1815: Pehr Brändström
- 1816–1820: Carl Albrekt Leijonflycht
- 1820–1823: Fredrik Ludvig Ridderstolpe
- 1823–1825: Gustaf Abraham Peyron
- 1825–1834: Carl Joakim von Düben
- 1835–1836: Otto Palmstierna
- 1836–1836: Carl Fredrik Wilhelm von Tuné (acting)
- 1836–1844: Axel Johan Adam Möllerhjelm
- 1844–1851: Carl Fredrik Wilhelm von Tuné
- 1851–1860: Fredrik af Klercker
- 1860–1870: Johan Gabriel Eketrä
- 1870–1884: David August Leonard Silverstolpe
- 1884–1897: Axel Magnus Otto Reuterskiöld
- 1897–1902: Waldemar Anshelm Gotthard Nisbeth
- 1902–1906: Carl Conrad Vogel
- 1906–1914: Pehr Hasselrot
- 1915–1919: Joachim Åkerman
- 1919–1923: Magnus Adlercreutz
- 1923–1927: Axel Klingenstierna
- 1994–1995: Kjell Högberg
- 1995–1997: Göran Andersson

== Names, designations and locations ==
Name	Translation	From		To
Kungl. Västmanlands regemente	Royal Västmanland Regiment	1628-??-??	–	1709-07-01
Kungl. Västmanlands regemente	Royal Västmanland Regiment	1709-??-??	–	1713-05-06
Kungl. Västmanlands regemente	Royal Västmanland Regiment	1713-??-??	–	1927-12-31
Avvecklingsorganisation	Decommissioning Organisation	1928-01-01	–	1928-03-31
Designation		From		To
№ 18		1816-10-01	–	1914-09-30
I 18		1914-10-01	–	1927-12-31
Location		From		To
Västerås/Utnäs löt		????-??-??	–	1906-09-30
Salbohed		1779-??-??	–	1906-09-30
Västerås Garrison		1906-10-01	–	1928-03-31

== See also ==
- List of Swedish infantry regiments
