= 2nd Life Grenadier Regiment (Sweden) =

Coordinates: 58°23′48″N 15°37′03″E

- Andra livgrenadjärregementet
- Active: 1816–1927
- Country: Sweden
- Allegiance: Swedish Armed Forces
- Branch: Swedish Army
- Type: Infantry
- Size: Regiment
- Part of: 2nd Military District (1833–1901); II Army Division (1902–1927)
- Garrison/HQ: Linköping
- Motto(s): Nulli secundus (Note: The motto was awarded to the Royal 2nd Life Grenadier Regiment in 1922 by the army division commander, major general T. Rudenschiöld. It was resumed by the Life Grenadier Brigade (Livgrenadjärbrigaden) during colonel Torbjörn Tillman's time as a brigade commander (1981–1987).) ("Second to none")
- Colors: Red
- March: "Es lebe hoch" (Schlögel) (Note: The march was adopted in 1888. The march was used by the Life Grenadier Regiment from 1928 to 1997.)
- Battle honours: Breitenfeld (1631), Lützen (1632), Kliszow (1702), Rakowitz (1705), Malatitze (1708)

Insignia
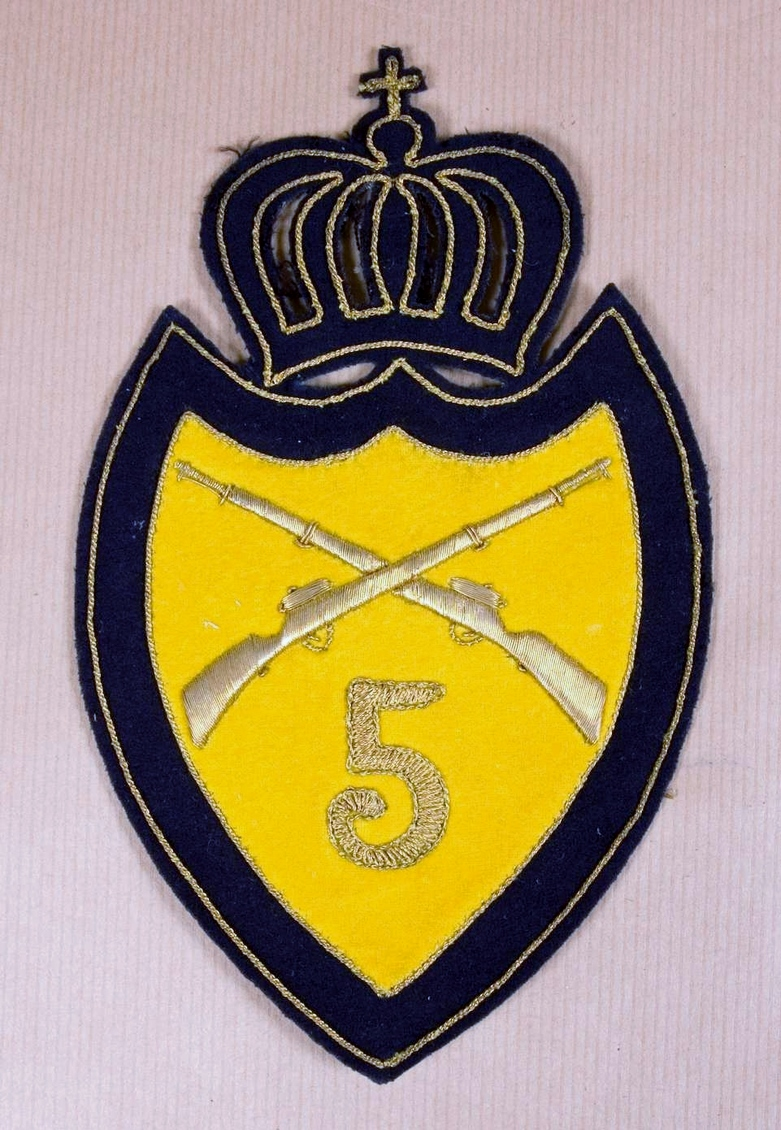
- Shoulder sleeve insignia

The 2nd Life Grenadier Regiment (Swedish: Andra livgrenadjärregementet), designation I 5, was a Swedish Army infantry regiment that traced its origins back to the 16th century. It was merged into a new regiment in 1927. The regiment's soldiers were recruited from the province of Östergötland.

== History ==
The regiment has its origins in fänikor (companies) raised in Östergötland in the 16th century. These units later formed Östergötland Infantry Regiment and Östergötland Cavalry Regiment which merged in 1791 and formed Life Grenadier Regiment. This regiment was split in 1816 creating 2nd Life Grenadier Regiment and 1st Life Grenadier Regiment.

The regiment was allotted in 1687. The regiment was given the designation I 5 (5th Infantry Regiment) in a general order in 1816. 2nd Life Grenadier Regiment was then merged with 1st Life Grenadier Regiment in 1928 to reform the old Life Grenadier Regiment.

== Campaigns ==
- None

== Organisation ==
- ?

== Commanding officers ==
Executive officers (Sekundchef) and regimental commander active at the regiment in the years 1816–1927. Sekundchef was a title used until 31 December 1974 at regiments that were part of the King's Life and Household Troops (Kungl. Maj:ts Liv- och Hustrupper). In the years 1816–1818, the Crown Prince was the regimental commander. In the years 1818–1927, His Majesty the King was the regimental commander.

=== Regimental commander ===
- 1816–1818: Crown Prince Charles John
- 1818–1844: Charles XIV John
- 1844–1859: Oscar I
- 1859–1872: Charles XV
- 1872–1905: Oscar II
- 1907–1927: Gustaf V

=== Executive officers (Sekundchefer) ===
- 1816–1817: C E Skiöldebrand
- 1817–1825: C Hallencreutz
- 1825–1844: C D Cronhielm
- 1844–1853: J F Boy
- 1853–1862: P C Lovén
- 1862–1871: E M af Klint
- 1871–1888: G H Spens
- 1888–1892: Hemming Gadd
- 1892–1905: Lars Fredrik Lovén
- 1905–1916: Magnus Blomstedt
- 1916–1922: Gustaf Bouveng
- 1922–1927: Patrik Ludvig Teodor Falkman

== Names, designations and locations ==
| Name | Translation | From | | To |
|---|---|---|---|---|
| Kungl. Andra livgrenadjärregementet | 2nd Life Grenadier Regiment | 1816-10-01 | – | 1927-12-31 |
| Designation | | From | | To |
| № 5 | | 1816-10-01 | – | 1914-09-30 |
| I 5 | | 1914-10-01 | – | 1927-12-31 |
| Location | | From | | To |
| Malmen | | 1816-10-01 | – | 1922-10-?? |
| Linköping Garrison | | 1922-10-?? | – | 1927-12-31 |

== See also ==
- List of Swedish infantry regiments
