= Sävar =

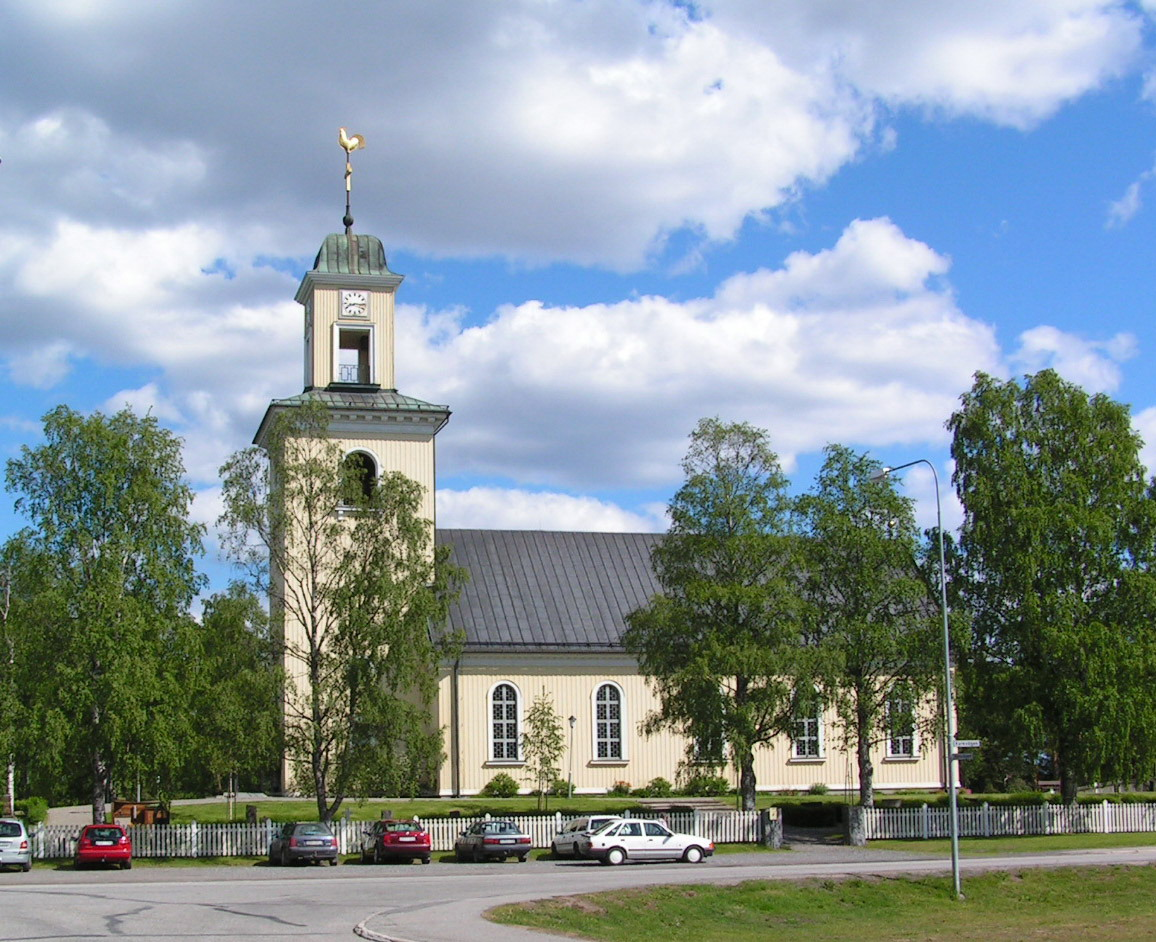
- Sävar Church in June 2007

- Location within Västerbotten Location within Sweden
- Coordinates: 63°54′5″N 20°33′25″E
- Country: Sweden
- Province: Västerbotten
- County: Västerbotten County
- Municipality: Umeå Municipality

Area
  - Total: 2.45 km^{2} (0.95 sq mi)

Population (31 December 2010)
  - Total: 2,670
  - Density: 1,092/km^{2} (2,830/sq mi)
- Time zone: UTC+1 (CET)
  - Summer (DST): UTC+2 (CEST)

Sävar (Swedish pronunciation: [ˈsɛ̂ːvar]) is a locality situated in Umeå Municipality, Västerbotten County, Sweden with 2,670 inhabitants in 2010.

It is located by E4 about 15 km north of Umeå, Sweden, and is mostly known for being the last battlefield of the Finnish War.

== Sävar skola ==
Sävar skola is a school in Sävar, located near central Sävar.

Around 700 students attend there. There is a swimming pool, sports hall, and nature nearby, and the school grounds include a multi-sport arena.

=== Controversies in Sävar skola ===
In the late 1990s and early 2000s, Sävar skola was criticized by authorities for failing to adequately handle cases of severe bullying. The school reached a settlement with local authorities regarding the incident.
