= 1st Life Grenadier Regiment (Sweden) =

Coordinates: 58°23′47″N 15°36′50″E

- Första livgrenadjärregementet
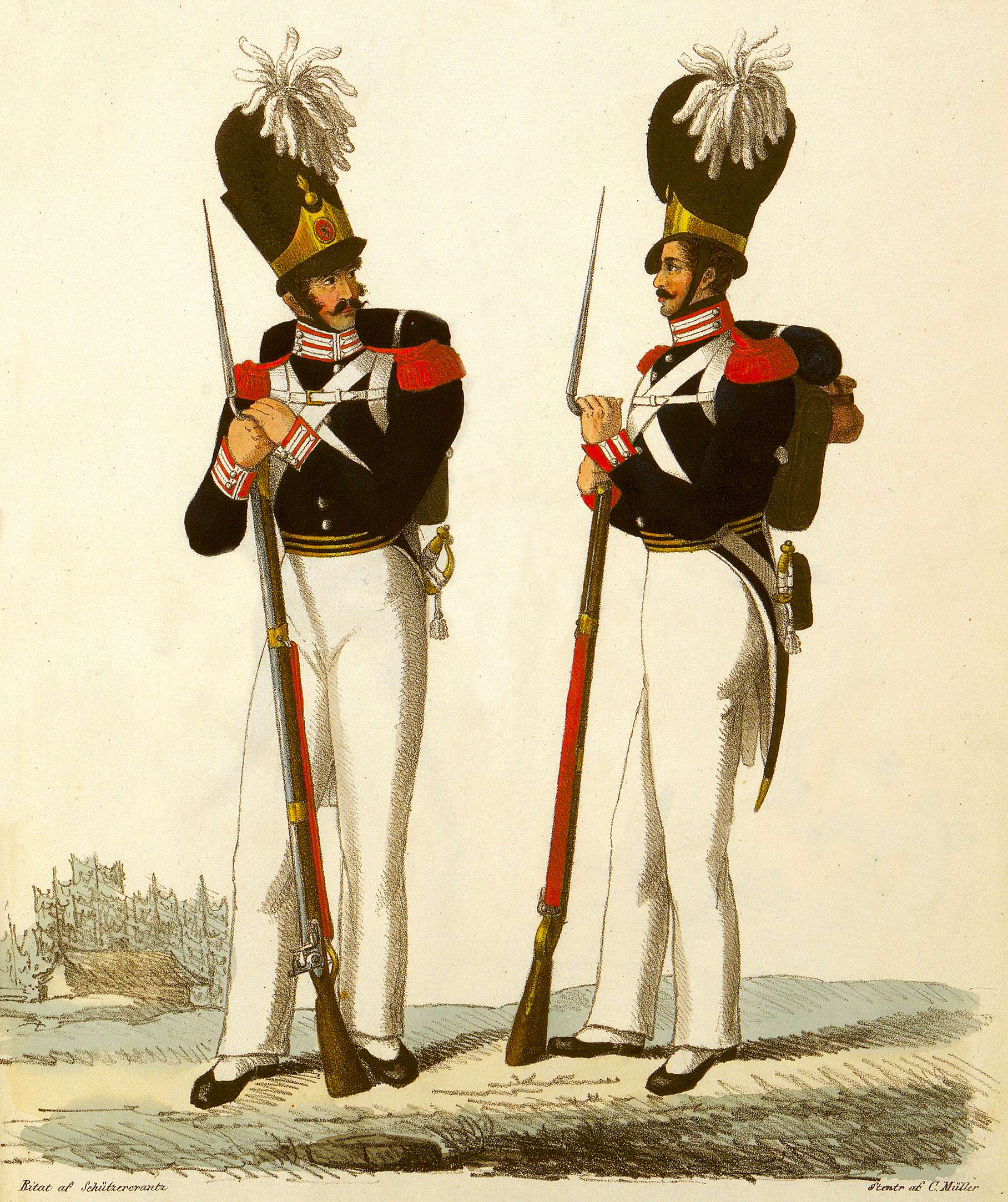
- Soldiers of the regiment with muskets, 1825
- Active: 1632–1927
- Country: Sweden
- Allegiance: Swedish Armed Forces
- Branch: Swedish Army
- Type: Infantry regiment
- Size: Regiment
- Part of: 2nd Military District (1833–1901); II Army Division (1902–1927)
- Garrison/HQ: Linköping
- Colors: White
- March: "Ryska grenadjärregementets 'Konungen av Preussen' marsch" (Schubert) (1845–1870, 1893–1927) "Wiener Rekruten-Marsch" (1870–1883) "Napoleonmarsch" (1883–1893)
- Battle honours: Lützen (1632), Leipzig (1642), Helsingborg (1710), Gadebusch (1712), Valkeala (1790)

The 1st Life Grenadier Regiment (Swedish: Första livgrenadjärregementet), designation I 4, was a Swedish Army infantry regiment that traced its origins back to the 16th century. It was merged into a new regiment in 1927. The regiment's soldiers were recruited from the province of Östergötland.

== History ==
The regiment has its origins in fänikor (companies) raised in Östergötland in the 16th century. These units later formed Östergötland Infantry Regiment and Östergötland Cavalry Regiment which merged in 1791 and formed Life Grenadier Regiment. This regiment was split in 1816 creating 1st Life Grenadier Regiment and 2nd Life Grenadier Regiment.

The regiment was allotted in 1685. The regiment was given the designation I 4 (4th Infantry Regiment) in a general order in 1816. 1st Life Grenadier Regiment was then merged with 2nd Life Grenadier Regiment in 1928 to reform the old Life Grenadier Regiment.

== Campaigns ==
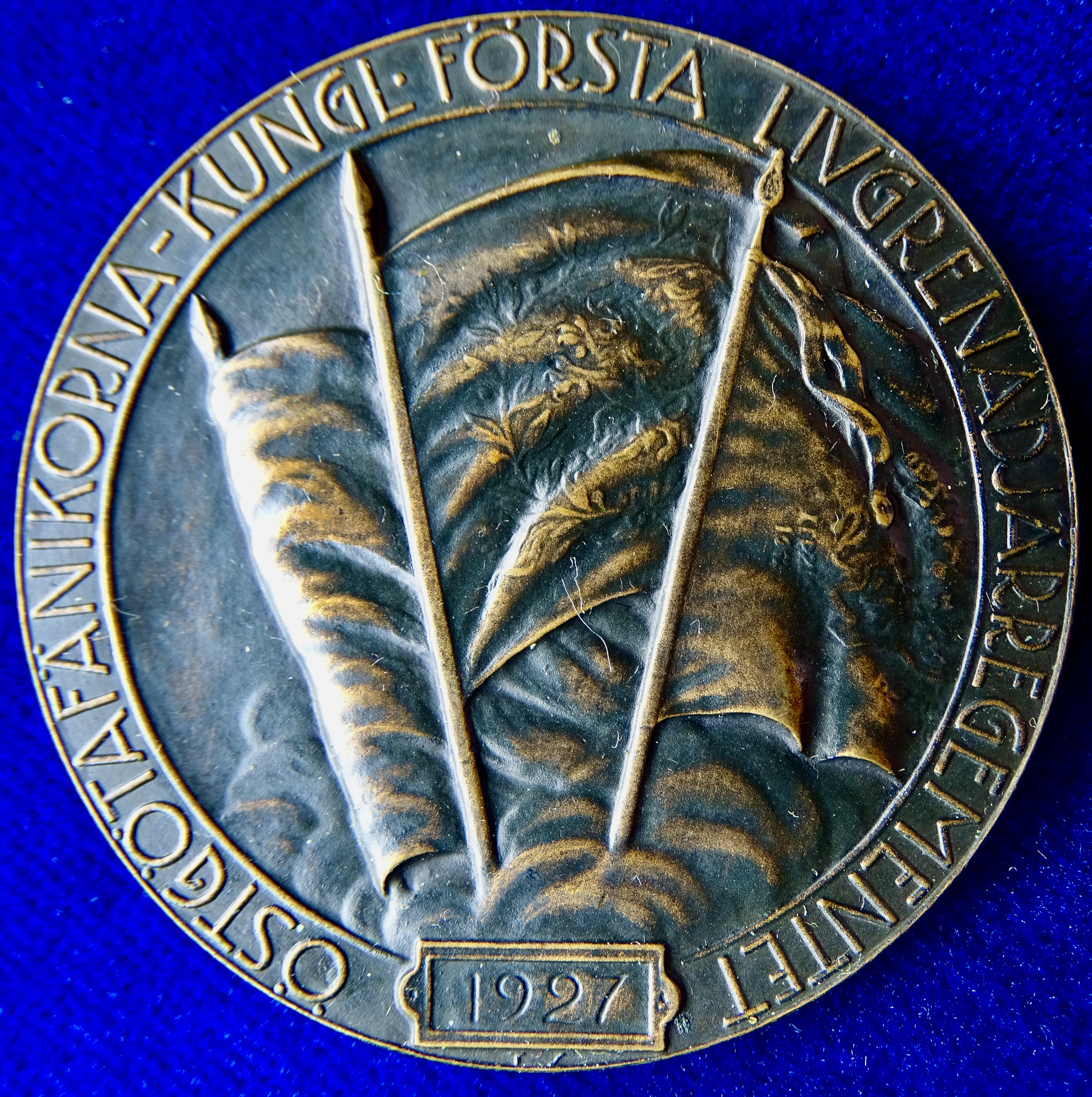
This 1927 Art Deco medal was edited for the dissolution of the 1st Life Grenadier Regiment, obverse

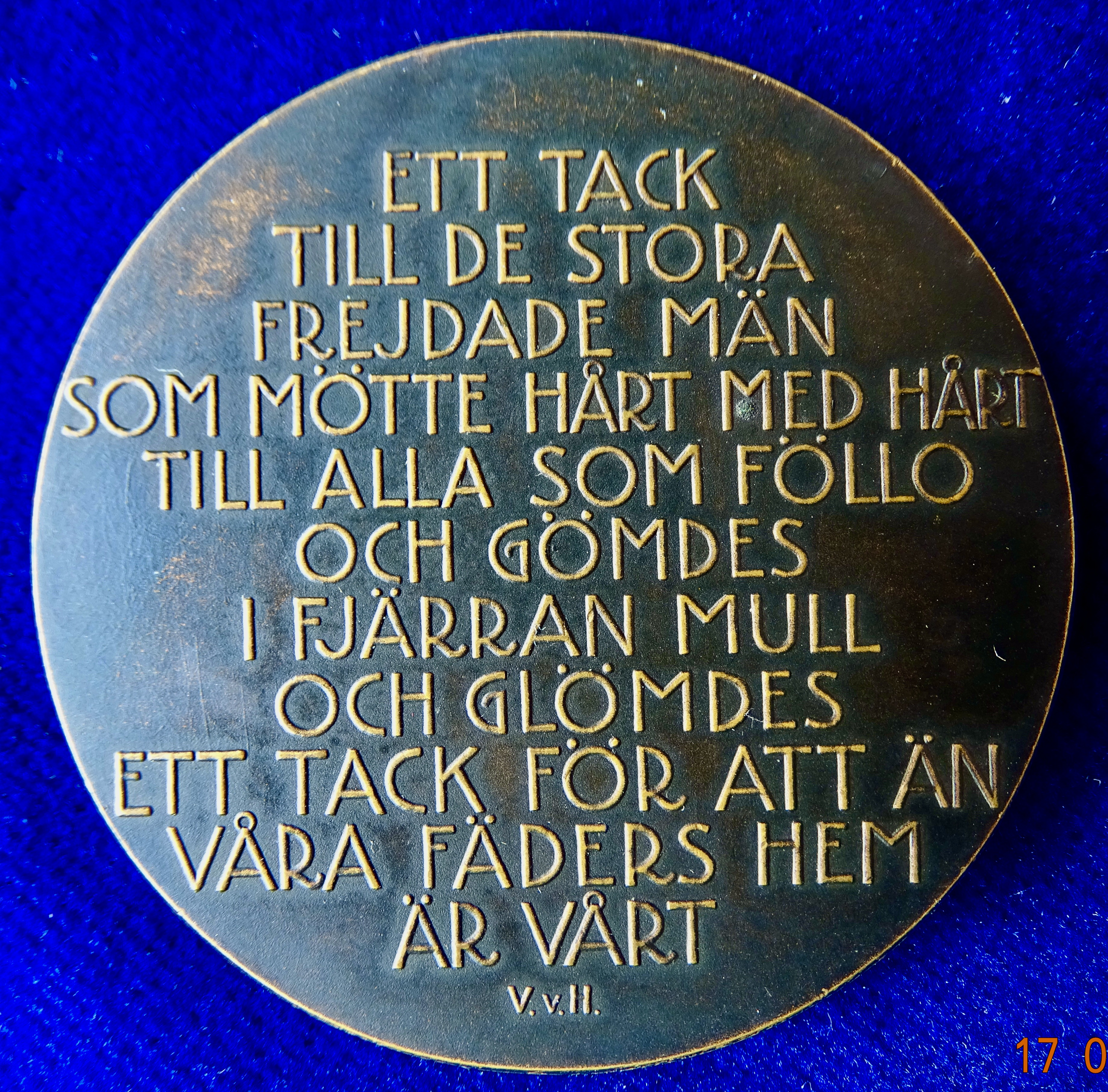
The reverse of this medal honours the soldiers defending their homeland on foreign soil

- None

== Organisation ==
- ?

== Commanding officers ==
Executive officers (Sekundchef) and regimental commander active at the regiment in the years 1816–1927. Sekundchef was a title used until 31 December 1974 at regiments that were part of the King's Life and Household Troops (Kungl. Maj:ts Liv- och Hustrupper). In the years 1816–1818, the Crown Prince was the regimental commander. In the years 1818–1927, His Majesty the King was the regimental commander.

=== Regimental commander ===
- 1816–1818: Crown Prince Charles John
- 1818–1844: Charles XIV John
- 1844–1859: Oscar I
- 1859–1872: Charles XV
- 1872–1905: Oscar II
- 1907–1927: Gustaf V

=== Executive officers (Sekundchefer) ===
- 1816–1832: C M Strömfelt
- 1832–1845: S von Post
- 1845–1848: C L von Hohenhausen
- 1848–1852: D M Klingspor
- 1852–1854: M Ahnström
- 1854–1858: J M Björnstjerna
- 1858–1871: C H Mörner
- 1871–1879: A G Örn
- 1879–1890: C A M Lagerfelt
- 1890–1898: P H W Reuterswärd
- 1898–1906: Per Henrik Edvard Brändström
- 1906–1914: Ernst Herman Daniel Vilhelm von Bornstedt
- 1914–1918: Carl Gustaf Hammarskjöld
- 1919–1927: Kunt Otto Hjalmar Säfwenberg

== Names, designations and locations ==
Name	Translation	From		To
Kungl Första livgrenadjärregementet	Royal 1st Life Grenadier Regiment	1816-10-01	–	1927-12-31
Designation		From		To
No. 4		1816-10-01	–	1914-09-30
I 4		1914-10-01	–	1927-12-31
Location		From		To
Malmen		1816-10-01	–	1922-10-??
Linköping Garrison		1922-10-??	–	1927-12-31

== See also ==
- List of Swedish regiments
