= Life Grenadier Regiment (Sweden) =

Coordinates: 58°23′47″N 15°36′50″E

- Livgrenadjärregementet
- Active: 1928–1997
- Country: Sweden
- Allegiance: Swedish Armed Forces
- Branch: Swedish Army
- Type: Infantry
- Size: Regiment
- Part of: Eastern Brigade (1928–1937); IV Army Division (1938–1942); IV Military District (1942–1966); Eastern Military District (1966–1991); Middle Military District (1991–1997)
- Garrison/HQ: Linköping
- Motto: Si vis pacem para bellum ("If you want peace prepare for war")
- Colors: White and red
- March: "Es lebe hoch" (Schlögel) (Note: The march was inherited from the 2nd Life Grenadier Regiment, and was established in 1953 by Army Order 33/1953.)
- Battle honours: Varberg (1565); Breitenfeld (1631); Lützen (1632); Wittstock (1636); Leipzig (1642); Warszawa (1656); Fredriksodde (1657); Tåget över Bält (1658); Lund (1676); Rügen (1678); Kliszow (1702); Warszawa (1705); Holovczyn (1708); Malatitze (1708); Rajovka (1708); Helsingborg (1710); Gadebusch (1712); Valkeala (1790); Svensksund (1790)

Insignia
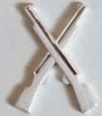
- Branch insignia

- Unit insignia m/51-m/60

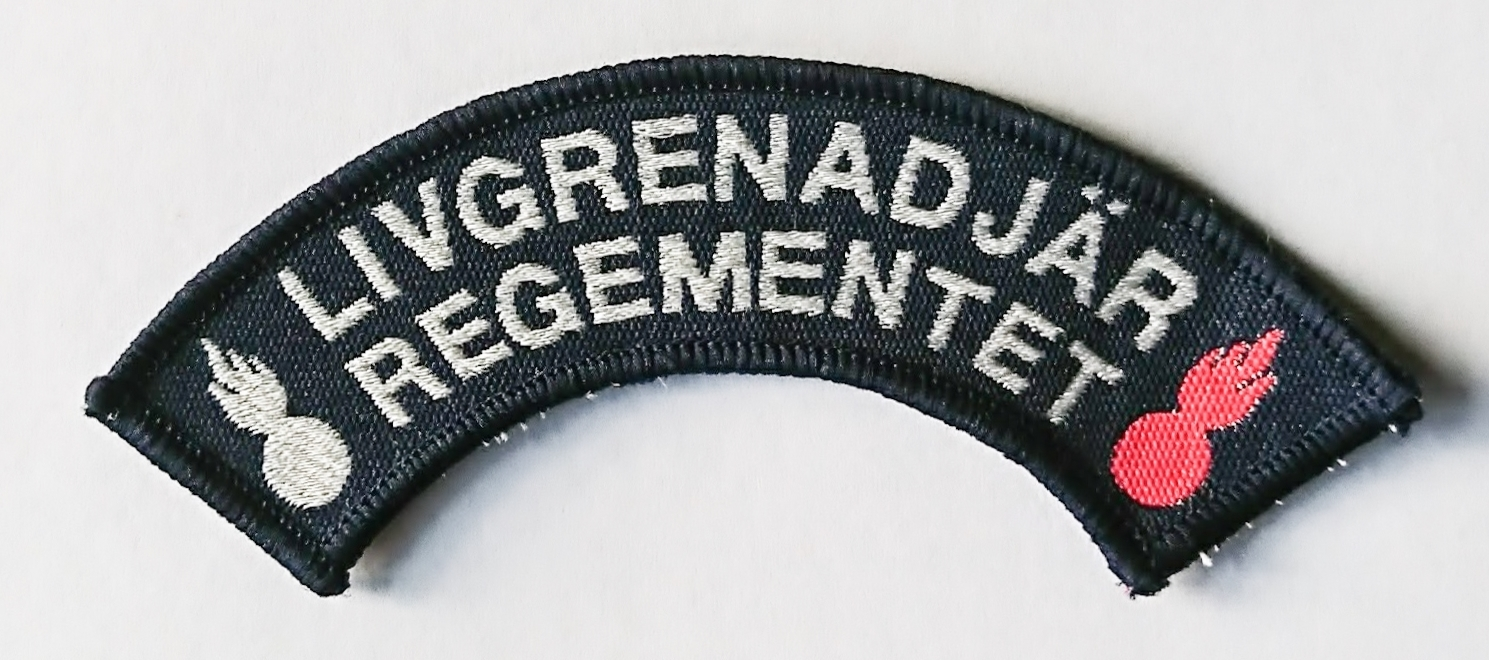
- Shoulder sleeve insignia

The Life Grenadier Regiment (Swedish: Livgrenadjärregementet), designations I 4 and I 4/Fo 41, was a Swedish Army infantry regiment that traced its origins back to the 16th century. It was disbanded in 1997. The regiment's soldiers were originally recruited from the provinces of Östergötland, and it was later garrisoned there.

== History ==
The regiment has its origins in fänikor (companies) raised in the 16th century, these units formed Östergötland Infantry Regiment and Östergötland Cavalry Regiment which merged in 1791 and formed the Life Grenadier Regiment. It consisted of two semi-independent units, Livgrenadjärregementets rotehållsdivision and Livgrenadjärregementets rusthållsdivision originating from the two merged infantry and cavalry regiments.

The regiment was split in two in 1816, forming 1st Life Grenadier Regiment and 2nd Life Grenadier Regiment. These two units were later merged and reformed the Life Grenadier Regiment in 1928, and the regiment was given the designation I 4 (4th Infantry Regiment). In 1973, the regiment gained the new designation I 4/Fo 41 as a consequence of a merge with the local defence district Fo 41. The Life Grenadier Regiment was garrisoned in Linköping and was disbanded in 1997.

== Heraldry and traditions ==
=== Colours, standards and guidons ===
Its last colour was presented to the regiment in Linköping by His Majesty the King Gustaf VI Adolf on 25 September 1964. It was used as regimental colour by I 4/Fo 41 until 1 January 1998. The colour is drawn by Brita Grep and embroidered by hand in insertion technique by the company Libraria. Blazon: "On white cloth in the centre the Royal Swedish coat of arms as to the law without mantle. Below the cross of the Order of the Seraphim, an erect white sword. In each corner a blazing grenade - white in the first and fourth corner (a legacy from the former Royal First Life Grenadier Regiment, I 4) and red in the second and third corner (a legacy from the former Royal Second Life Grenadier Regiment, I 5). Battle honours (Varberg 1565, Breitenfeld 1631, Lützen 1632, Wittstock 1636, Leipzig 1642, Warszawa 1656, Fredriksodde 1657, Tåget över Bält 1658, Lund 1676, Rügen 1678, Kliszow 1702, Warszawa 1705, Holovczyn 1708, Malatitze 1708, Rajovka (1708, Helsingborg 1710, Gadebusch 1712, Valkeala 1790, Svensksund 1790) in yellow horizontally placed around the coat of arms."

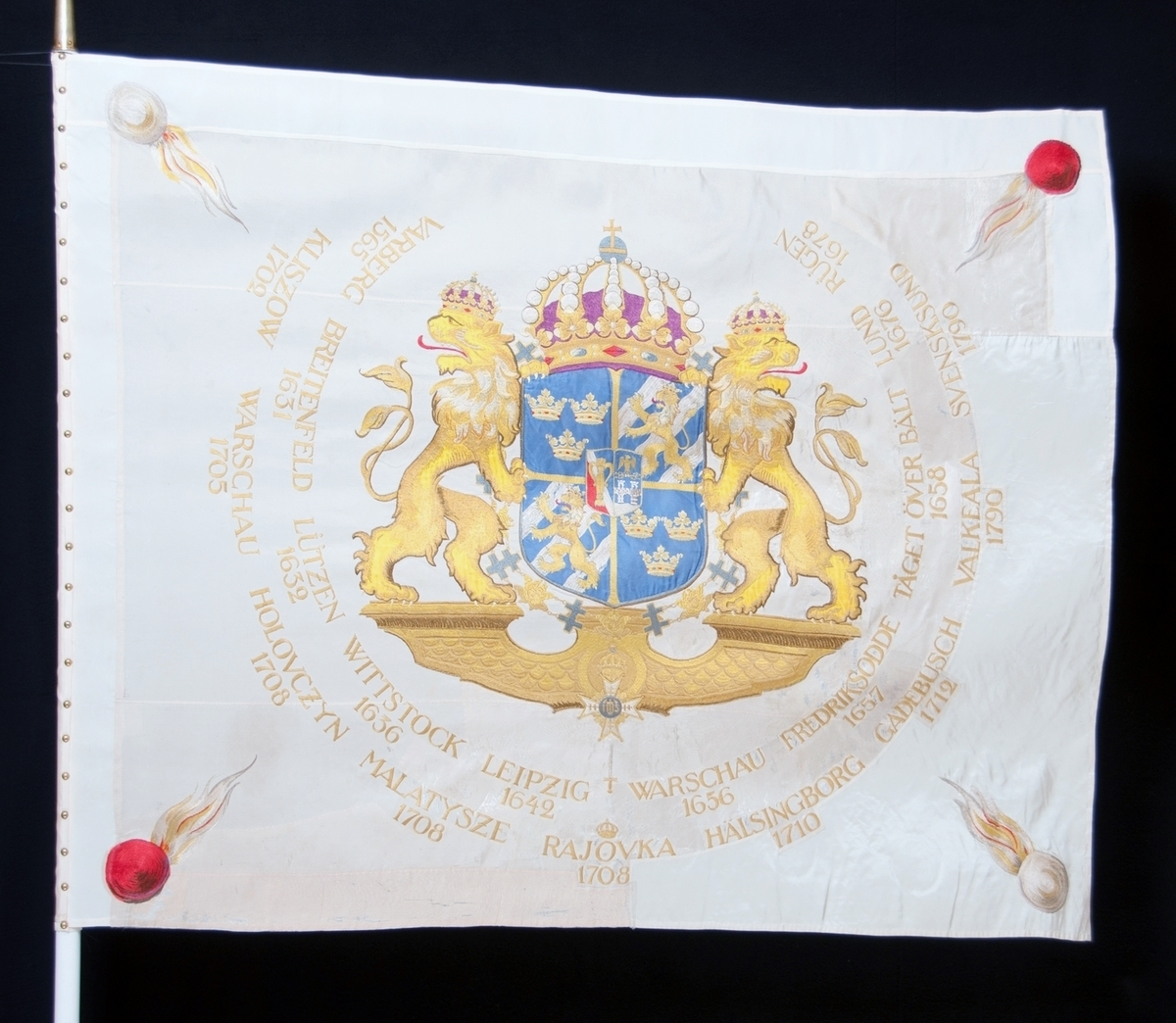
1932 regimental colour

=== Coat of arms ===
The coat of the arms of the Life Grenadier Regiment (I 4/Fo 41) 1977–1994, the Life Grenadier Brigade (Livgrenadjärbrigaden, IB 4) and the Life Grenadier Group (Livgrenadjärgruppen) since 1997. Blazon: "Azure, the lesser coat of arms of Sweden, three open crowns or placed two and one. The shield surmounted two muskets in saltire argent followed on both sides by blazing grenades, dexter argent and sinister gules". The coat of the arms of the Life Grenadier Regiment (I 4/Fo 41) 1994–1997. Blazon: "Azure, the lesser coat of arms of Sweden, three open crowns or placed two and one. The shield surmounted two muskets in saltire argent followed on both sides by blazing grenades, dexter argent and sinister gules."

Coat of arms of the Life Grenadier Regiment (I 4/Fo 41) 1977–1994, the Life Grenadier Brigade (Livgrenadjärbrigaden, IB 4) and the Life Grenadier Group (Livgrenadjärgruppen) 1997–present.

Coat of the arms of the Life Grenadier Regiment (I 4/Fo 41) 1994–1997.

=== Medals ===
In 1996, the Livgrenadjärregementets (I 4) minnesmedalj ("Life Grenadier Regiment (I 4) Commemorative Medal") in silver (LivgregSMM) of the 8th size was established. The medal ribbon is divided in white and red moiré.

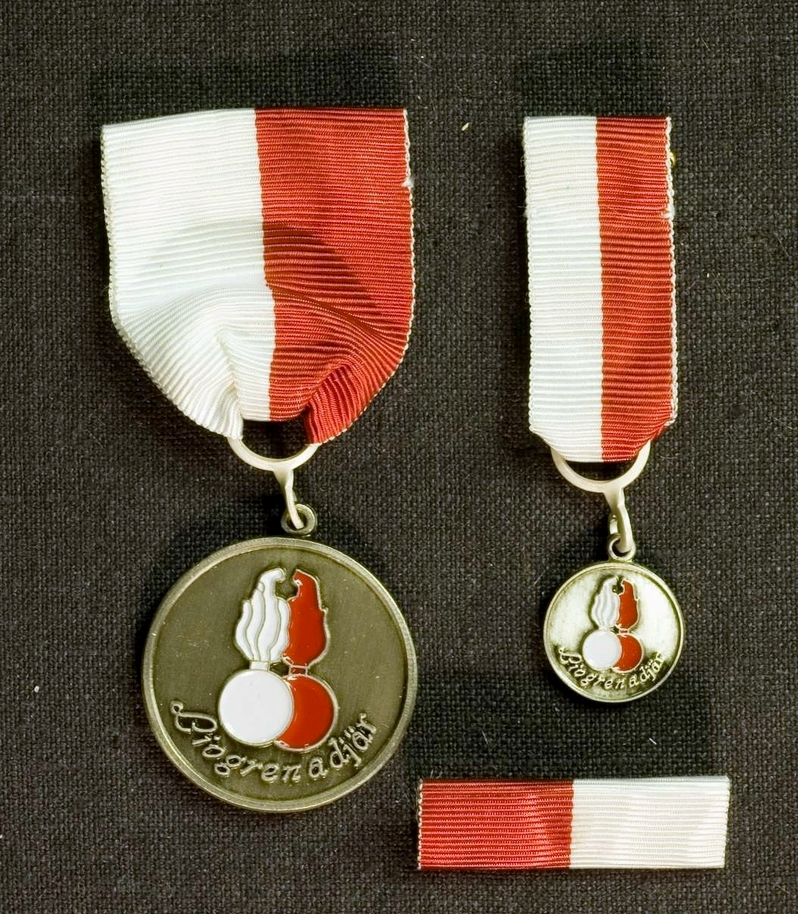
Life Grenadier Regiment (I 4) Commemorative Medal

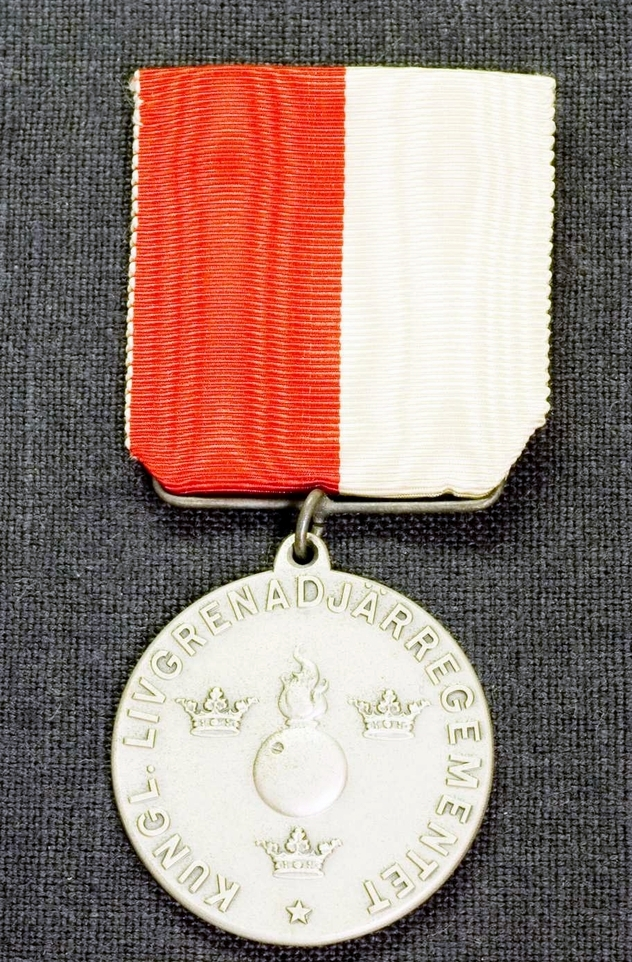
Life Grenadier Regiment Medal of Merit in silver

=== Heritage ===
Since 1 January 1998, the Life Grenadier Group (Livgrenadjärgruppen) has inherited the colours and traditions of the regiment. From 1 July 2013, the traditions of the regiment are continued by the 30th Life Grenadier Battalion and the 31st Life Grenadier Battalion, included in the Life Grenadier Group.

== Commanding officers ==
Executive officers (Sekundchefer) and regimental commanders from 1792 to 1816 and 1928 to 1997. Sekundchef was a title used until 31 December 1974 in the regiments that were included in the King's Life and Household Troops (Kungl. Maj:ts Liv- och Hustrupper). From 1791 to 1809 the Crown Prince was regimental commander. From 1818 to 1974 His Majesty the King was regimental commander. From 1975 to 1997, the monarch was honorary commander of the regiment. From 1975 the regimental commander was also Defence District Commander, and held the rank of Senior Colonel.

=== Executive officers ===
- 1928–1933: Patrik Ludvig Teodor Falkman
- 1933–1937: Georg Alfred Edvard Ahlström
- 1937–1939: Carl Bennedich
- 1939–1943: Rutger R:son Gyllenram
- 1943–1952: Karl Einar Harald Appelbom
- 1951–1957: Per Axel Holger Stenholm
- 1957–1963: Pieter Fürst
- 1963–1971: Sven Widegren
- 1971–1974: Ingvar Selander
- 1974–1975: Lennart Tollerz

=== Regimental commanders ===
- 1928–1950: Gustaf V
- 1950–1973: Gustaf VI Adolf
- 1973–1974: Carl XVI Gustaf
- 1975–1979: Lennart Bredberg
- 1979–1982: Senior colonel Sven Torfgård
- 1982–1987: Per-Arne Ringh
- 1987–1991: Lars-Eric Widman
- 1991–1995: Torbjörn Tillman
- 1995–1997: Gunnar Ridderstad

=== Deputy regimental commanders ===
- 1978–1981: Colonel Holger Bjärnlid

== Names, designations and locations ==
Name	Translation	From		To
Kungl Livgrenadjärregementet	Royal Life Grenadier Regiment	1928-01-01	–	1974-12-31
Livgrenadjärregementet	Life Grenadier Regiment	1975-01-01	–	1975-06-30
Livgrenadjärregementet och försvarsområde	Life Grenadier Regiment and Defence District	1975-07-01	–	1997-12-31
Designation		From		To
I 4		1928-01-01	–	1975-06-30
I 4/Fo 41		1975-07-01	–	1997-12-31
Location		From		To
Linköping Garrison		1928-01-01	–	1997-12-31

== See also ==
- List of Swedish infantry regiments
