= Jönköping Regiment =

Coordinates: 57°46′10″N 14°11′43″E

- Jönköpings regemente
- Active: 1623–1709, 1709–1715, 1716–1927
- Country: Sweden
- Allegiance: Swedish Armed Forces
- Branch: Swedish Army
- Type: Infantry regiment
- Size: Regiment
- Part of: 2nd Military District (1833–1893); 2nd Army Division (1893–1901); II Army Division (1902–1927)
- Garrison/HQ: Jönköping
- Colors: Red and yellow
- March: "Napoleon-marschen" (Parlow) (Note: The march was adopted in 1895, and was taken over by the 1st Life Grenadier Regiment. It was used by the Småland Brigade (Smålandsbrigaden) from 1995 to 1998.)
- Battle honours: Lützen (1632), Wittstock (1636), Malatitze (1708), Helsingborg (1710)

The Jönköping Regiment (Swedish: Jönköpings regemente), designation I 12, was a Swedish Army infantry regiment that traced its origins back to the 16th century. It was merged with another unit to form a new regiment in 1927. The regiment's soldiers were originally recruited from Jönköping County, and it was later garrisoned there.

== History ==
The regiment has its origins in fänikor (companies) raised in Jönköping County in the 1550s and 1560s. In 1619, these units—along with fänikor from the nearby province of Östergötland—were organised by Gustav II Adolf into Östergötlands storregemente, of which eleven of the total 24 companies were recruited in Jönköping County. Östergötlands storregemente consisted of three field regiments, of which Jönköping Regiment was one. Sometime between 1623 and 1628, the grand regiment was permanently split into three smaller regiments, of which Jönköping Regiment was one.

Jönköping Regiment was one of the original 20 Swedish infantry regiments mentioned in the Swedish constitution of 1634, although it was mentioned as one of two regiments that should merge to form Småland Regiment, but that regiment was never formed and instead Jönköping Regiment and Kronoberg Regiment were kept separate. The regiment's first commander was Lars Kagg. The regiment was allotted in 1684. The regiment was given the designation I 12 (12th Infantry Regiment) in a general order in 1816. Jönköping Regiment was garrisoned in Jönköping from 1909, before it was merged with Kalmar Regiment to form Jönköping-Kalmar Regiment in 1927.

== Campaigns ==
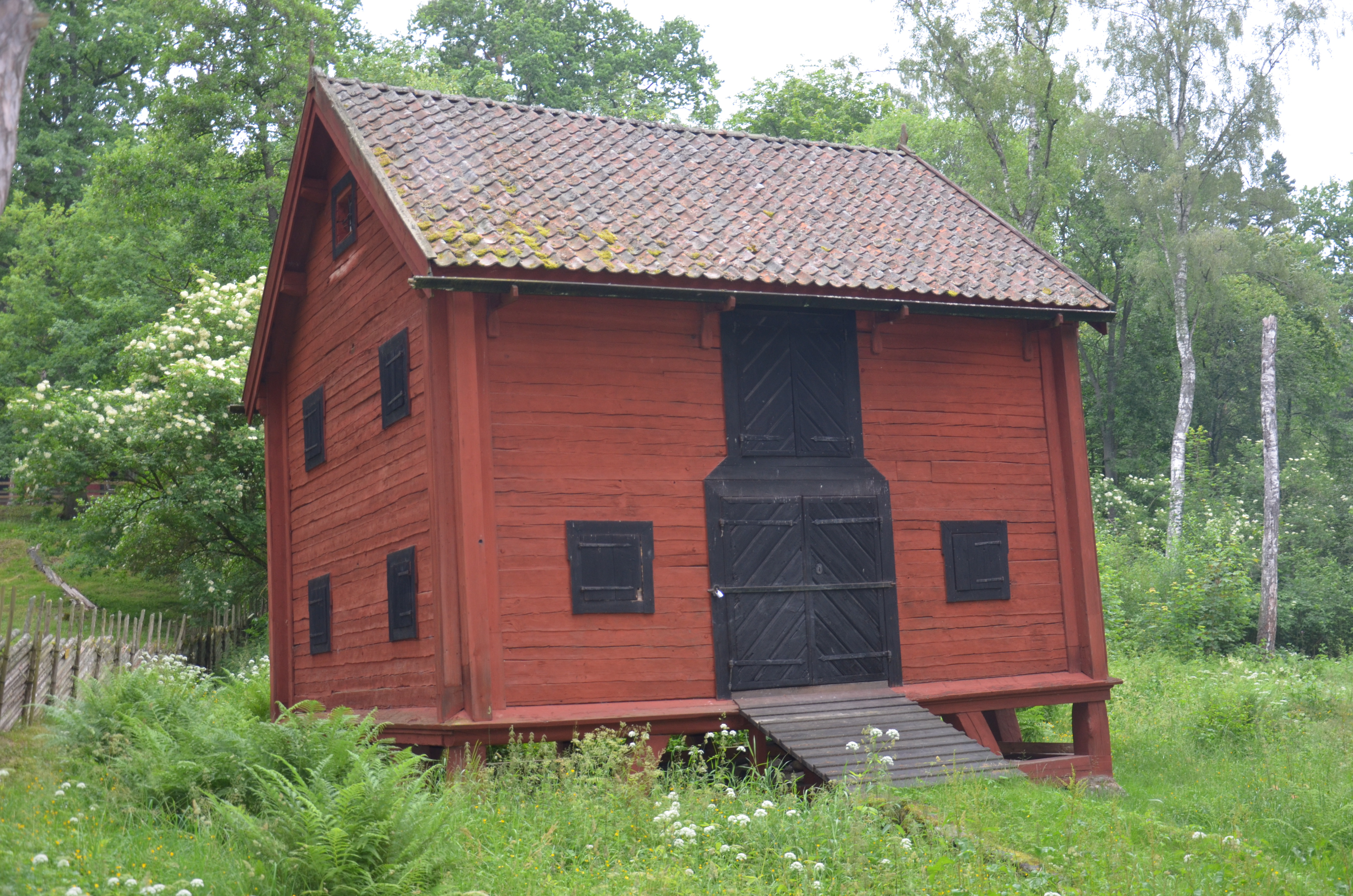
Material storehouse for a company of Jönköping Regiment

- The Polish War (1600–1629)
- The Thirty Years' War (1630–1648)
- The Northern Wars (1655–1661)
- The Scanian War (1674–1679)
- The Great Northern War (1700–1721)
- The Seven Years' War (1757–1762)
- The Franco-Swedish War (1805–1810)
- The Finnish War (1808–1809)
- The War of the Sixth Coalition (1813–1814)
- The Campaign against Norway (1814)

== Organisation ==
1634(?)

- Livkompaniet
- Överstelöjtnantens kompani
- Majorens kompani
- Norra Wedbo kompani
- Västra Härads kompani
- Wässbo kompani
- Ösbo härads kompani
- Wista härads kompani

1814(?)

- Livkompaniet
- Norra Vedbo kompani
- Västra Härads kompani
- Vista kompani
- Mo kompani
- Norra Vestbo kompani
- Östbo kompani
- Södra Vestbo kompani

== Commanding officers ==
Regimental commanders active at the regiment during the years 1623–1927.

- 1623–1631: Lars Kagg
- 1631–1700: ???
- 1700–1706: L Clerck
- 1706–1706: E Hillebard
- 1706–1710: Georg von Buchwaldt †
- 1709–1710: G W Fleetwood (acting)
- 1710–1710: H Hamilton
- 1710–1712: Anders Eriksson Leijonhielm
- 1712–1714: Carl Breitholtz (acting)
- 1714–1725: Henrik Otto von Albedyl
- 1725–1736: Christer Henrik d'Albedyhll
- 1736–1739: B Horn
- 1739–1747: P Silfversparre
- 1747–1761: Erik Gustaf Queckfeldt
- 1761–1772: Carl Fredrik Pechlin
- 1773–1774: Hugo Herman von Saltza
- 1774–1774: Hans Gustaf Gyllengranat
- 1774–1782: Germund Carl von Braunjohan
- 1782–1785: Otto Jacob Zöge von Manteuffel
- 1785–1790: Curt Philip Carl von Schwerin
- 1790–1797: A L von Friesendorff
- 1797–1810: W Bennet
- 1810–1816: Gustaf Bergenstråhle
- 1816–1818: C S von Hartmansdorff
- 1818–1849: H Stierngranat
- 1849–1857: Enar Nordenfelt
- 1857–1867: C J Munck
- 1867–1884: A M Leuhusen
- 1884–1892: H O E d'Ailly
- 1892–1901: Fredrik August Åstrand
- 1901–1909: Otto Ewert Mauritz Wolffelt
- 1909–1917: Per Ludwig Henrik Alexander Tham
- 1917–1926: Axel Steuch
- 1926–1927: Fredrik Lovén

== Names, designations and locations ==
Name	Translation	From		To
Kungl. Jönköpings regemente	Royal Jönköping Regiment	1623-06-27	–	1709-06-28
Kungl. Jönköpings regemente	Royal Jönköping Regiment	1709-??-??	–	1715-12-13
Kungl. Jönköpings regemente	Royal Jönköping Regiment	1716-??-??	–	1927-12-31
Avvecklingsorganisation	Decommissioning Organisation	1928-01-01	–	1928-03-31
Designation		From		To
№ 12		1816-10-01	–	1914-09-30
I 12		1914-10-01	–	1927-12-31
Locations		From		To
Skillingaryd		1788-08-08	–	1914-10-09
Jönköping Garrison		1914-10-09	–	1928-03-31

== See also ==
- List of Swedish regiments
