= Östergötland Infantry Regiment =

Swedish Army unit (1636–1791)

- Östgöta infanteriregemente
- Active: 1636–1791
- Country: Sweden
- Branch: Swedish Army
- Type: Infantry
- Size: Regiment
- Colours: White
- Battle honours: None

The Östergötland Infantry Regiment (Swedish: Östgöta infanteriregemente) was a Swedish Army infantry regiment with origins tracing back to the 16th century. In 1791, they were merged into another unit to form a new regiment, the Life Grenadier Regiment. The regiment's soldiers were recruited from the province of Östergötland.

== History ==
The regiment originated in 16th century Östergötland as fänikor (companies). In 1619, these units—along with the fänikor from nearby Jönköping County—were organised by Gustav II Adolf into the Östergötland Grand Regiment, where 9 out of 24 companies were recruited from Östergötland. Östergötlands storregemente consisted of three field regiments, one of which was the Östergötland Infantry Regiment. Sometime between 1623 and 1628, the Östergötland Grand Regiment was split into three smaller regiments.

The regiment was officiated in 1636 although it had existed since the 1620s. The Östergötland Infantry Regiment was one of the original 20 Swedish infantry regiments mentioned in the Swedish constitution of 1634. The regiment's first commander was Johan Banér. It was allotted in 1685.

In 1791, the Östergötland Infantry Regiment was merged with the Östergötland Cavalry Regiment to form the Life Grenadier Regiment. The reorganisation and renaming to "life grenadier" was done because of the regiment's achievements during the 1788 Russo-Swedish War. Within the new regiment, the Östergötland Infantry Regiment was renamed to Livgrenadjärregementets rotehållsdivision and retained some form of independence.

== Campaigns ==
- The Northern Seven Years' War (1563–1570)
- The War against Sigismund (1598–1599)
- The Polish War (1600–1629)
- The Kalmar War (1611–1613)
- The Thirty Years' War (1630–1648)
- The Torstenson War (1643–1645)
- The Northern Wars (1655–1661)
- The Scanian War (1674–1679)
- The Great Northern War (1700–1721)
- The Gustav III's Russian War (1788–1790)

== Organisation ==
1634(?)

- Livkompaniet
- Överstelöjtnantens kompani
- Majorens kompani
- Ydre kompani
- Östanstångs kompani
- Kinds kompani
- Västanstångs kompani
- Vadstena kompani

17??(?)

- Livkompaniet
- Stångebro kompani
- Kinds kompani
- Östanstångs kompani
- Ombergs kompani
- Vreta Klosters kompani
- Motala kompani
- Ydre kompani

== Name, designation and garrison ==
Name	Translation	From		To
Östgöta infanteriregemente	Östergötland Infantry Regiment	1636	–	1791

Designation	From		To
No designation		–	

Training ground or garrison town	From		To
Malmen	17th century	–	1791

== See also ==
- List of Swedish regiments
- Provinces of Sweden
