= Närke-Värmland Regiment =

- Närke-Värmlands regemente
- Active: 1624–1812
- Country: Sweden
- Branch: Swedish Army
- Type: Infantry
- Size: Regiment
- Colors: Red and blue (uniform, –1675); Red and white (uniform, 1675–1691)
- Battle honours: (Note: Närke-Värmlands regemente was never awarded any battle honours, but the successor unit Värmland Regiment was awarded ten such honours, of which all ten battles were fought under the name of Närke-Värmland Regiment. These ten battle honours were Fredriksodde (1657), Tåget över Bält (1658), Lund (1677), Landskrona (1678), Narva (1700), Düna (1701), Kliszow (1702), Fraustadt (1706), Malatitze (1708), Gadebusch (1712).)

The Närke-Värmland Regiment (Swedish: Närke-Värmlands regemente) was a Swedish Army infantry regiment that traced its origins back to the 16th century. It was split into two new regiments in 1812. The regiment's soldiers were recruited from the provinces of Närke and Värmland.

== History ==
The regiment has its origins in fänikor (companies) raised in Närke and Värmland in the 16th century. In 1614, these units—along with fänikor from the nearby province of Södermanland—were organised by Gustav II Adolph into Södermanlands storregemente, of which eleven of the total 24 companies were recruited in Värmland and five in Närke. Södermanlands storregemente consisted of three field regiments, of which Närke Regiment and Värmland Regiment were two. Sometime around 1624, the grand regiment was permanently split into three smaller regiments, of which Närke Regiment and Värmland Regiment were two. In 1629, these two regiments were merged to form Närke-Värmland Regiment.

The Närke-Värmland Regiment was one of the original 20 Swedish infantry regiments mentioned in the Swedish constitution of 1634. The regiment's first commander was the Scot Alexander Leslie. It was allotted in 1686 (Närke) and 1688 (Värmland). The regiment was split in 1812 into the two original regiments, Närke Regiment and Värmland Regiment.

== Campaigns ==
- The Polish War (1600–1629)
- The Thirty Years' War (1630–1648)
- The Northern Wars (1655–1661)
- The Scanian War (1674–1679)
- The Great Northern War (1700–1721)
- The Hats' Russian War (1741–1743)
- The Seven Years' War (1757–1762)
- The Gustav III's Russian War (1788–1790)
- The Franco-Swedish War (1805–1810)
- The Finnish War (1808–1809)

== Organisation ==
–1812

- Livkompaniet
- Överstelöjtnantens kompani
- Majorens kompani
- Örebro kompani
- Kristinehamns kompani
- Jösse härads kompani
- Älvdals kompani
- Näs kompani
- Karlstads kompani
- Nordmarks kompani

== Name, designation and garrison ==
Name	Translation	From		To
Närkes regemente	Närke Regiment	1624	–	1629
Värmlands regemente	Värmland Regiment	1624	–	1629
Närke-Värmlands regemente	Närke-Värmland Regiment	1629	–	1812-06-07

Designation	From		To
None		–	

Training ground or garrison town	From		To
Västra fältet	1684	–	1812-06-07
Ombergsheden	1684	–	1812-06-07

== See also ==
- List of Swedish regiments
