= Kronoberg Regiment =

- Kronobergs regemente
- Active: 1623–1709, 1709–1997
- Country: Sweden
- Allegiance: Swedish Armed Forces
- Branch: Swedish Army
- Type: Infantry
- Size: Regiment
- Part of: 2nd Military District (1833–1893); 2nd Army Division (1893–1901); II Army Division (1902–1927); Southern Army Division (1928–1936); I Army Division (1937–1943); I Military District (1943–1966); Southern Military District (1966-1997)
- Garrison/HQ: Växjö
- Colors: Red and yellow
- March: "Admiral Stosch" (Latann) (Note: The march was adopted in 1880 and was established in 1953 by Army Order 33/1953. Used by the Kronoberg Group (Kronobergsgruppen) in the years 1998–2005.)
- Anniversaries: 6 June, 6 November, 11 November
- Battle honours: Breitenfeld (1631), Lützen (1632), Wittstock (1636), Landskrona (1677), Kliszow (1702), Warszawa (1705), Fraustadt (1706), Holovczyn (1708), Hälsingborg (1710), Valkeala (1790)

Insignia
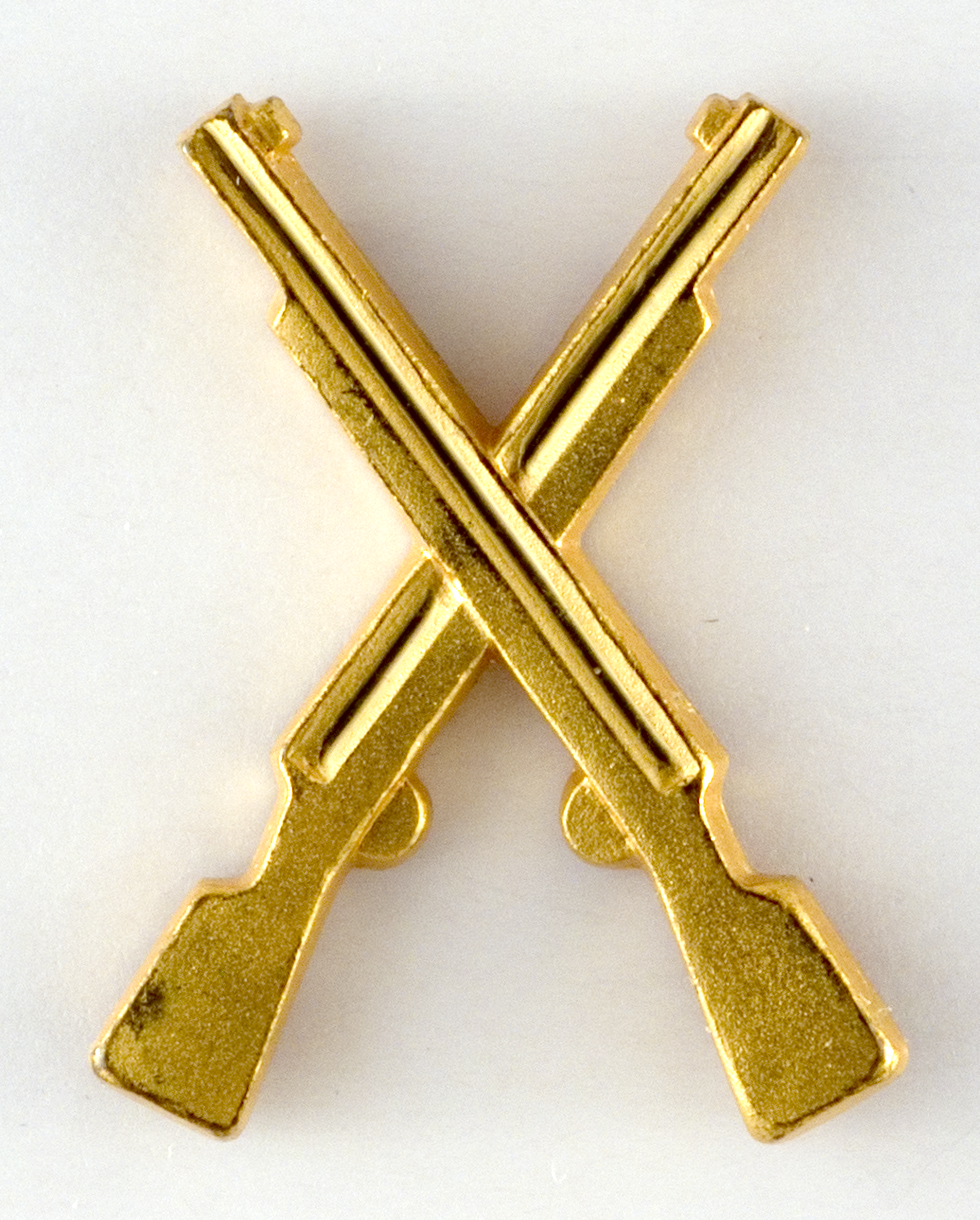
- Branch insignia m/60

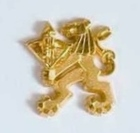
- Unit insignia m/60

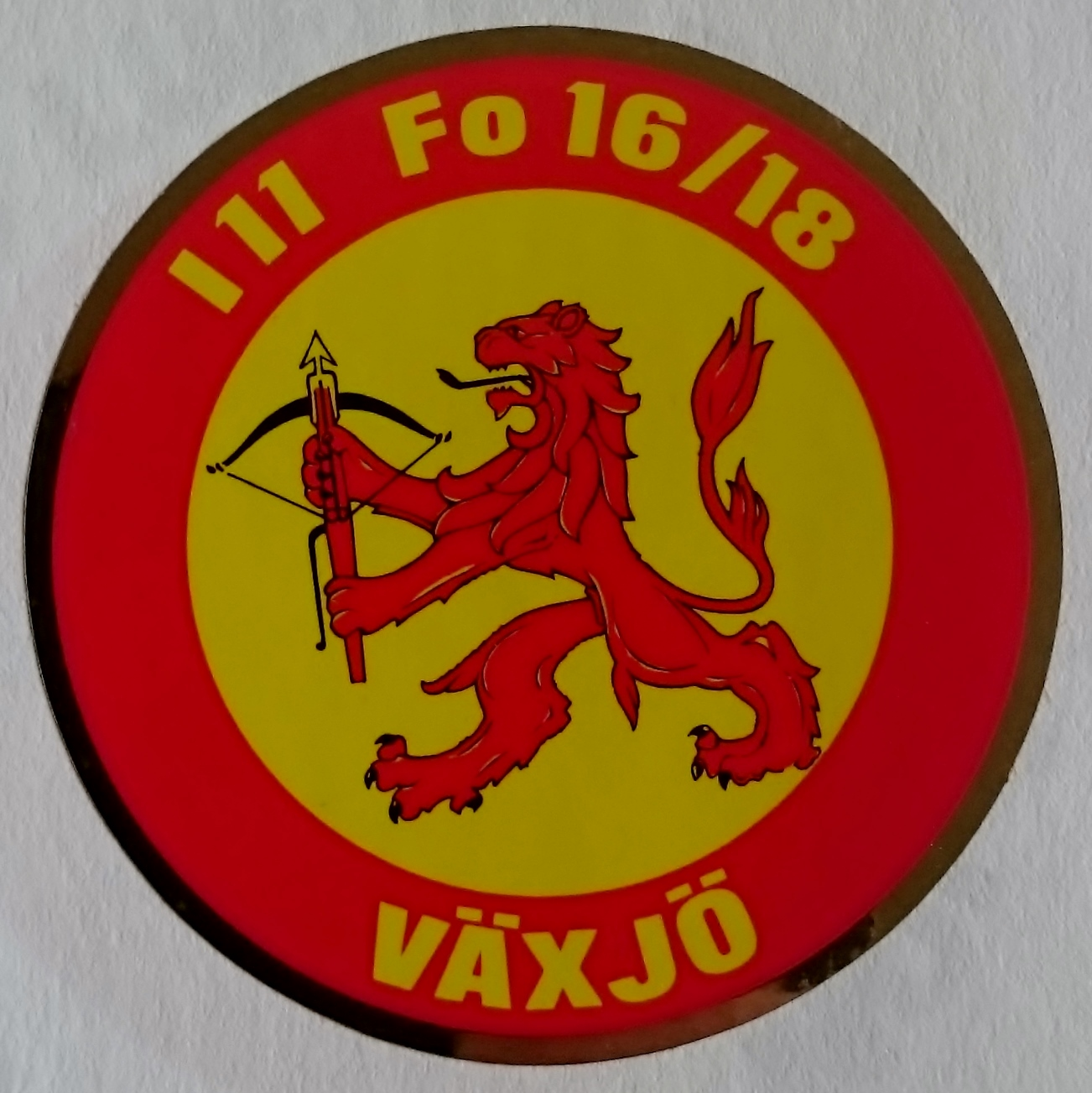
- Shoulder sleeve insignia

The Kronoberg Regiment (Swedish: Kronobergs regemente), designations I 11 and I 11/Fo 16, was a Swedish Army infantry regiment that traced its origins back to the 16th century. It was disbanded in 1997. The regiment's soldiers were originally recruited from Kronoberg County, and they were later garrisoned there.

== History ==
The regiment originated in fänikor (companies) and was raised in Kronoberg County in the 16th century. In 1616, these units—along with fänikor from the nearby Kalmar County—were organised by Gustav II Adolf into Smålands storregemente, of which twelve of the total 24 companies were recruited in Kronoberg County. Smålands storregemente consisted of three field regiments, of which Kronoberg Regiment was one. Sometime around 1623, the grand regiment was permanently split into three smaller regiments, of which the Kronoberg Regiment was one.

Kronoberg Regiment was one of the original 20 Swedish infantry regiments mentioned in the Swedish constitution of 1634, although it was mentioned as one of two regiments that should merge to form Småland Regiment, that regiment was never formed and instead Kronoberg Regiment and Jönköping Regiment were kept separate. The regiment's first commander was Patrick Ruthwen. The regiment was allotted in 1684. The regiment was given the designation I 11 (11th Infantry Regiment) in a general order in 1816.

Kronoberg Regiment was garrisoned in Växjö from 1920. In 1974, the regiment gained the new designation I 11/Fo 16 as a consequence of a merge with the local defence district Fo 16. The regiment was disbanded in 1997.

== Campaigns ==
- The War against Sigismund (1598–1599) (Note: Participated as the various fänikor that later formed the regiment.)
- The Polish War (1600–1629)
- The Thirty Years' War (1630–1648)
- The Torstenson War (1643–1645)
- The Northern Wars (1655–1661)
- The Scanian War (1674–1679)
- The Great Northern War (1700–1721)
- The Seven Years' War (1757–1762)
- The Gustav III's Russian War (1788–1790)
- The First War against Napoleon (1805–1810)
- The Finnish War (1808–1809)
- The War of the Sixth Coalition (1813–1814)

== Organisation ==
1684(?)

- Livkompaniet
- Överstelöjtnantens kompani
- Majorens kompani
- Albo kompani
- Norra Sunnerbo kompani
- Norrvidinge kompani
- Kinnevalds kompani
- Södra Sunnerbo kompani

18??

- Livkompaniet
- Skatelövs kompani
- Kinnevalds kompani
- Norrvidinge kompani
- Ljungby kompani
- Södra Sunnerbo kompani
- Albo kompani
- Norra Sunnerbo kompani

== Heraldry and traditions ==
=== Colours, standards and guidons ===
The regiment has carried a number of different colours over the years. The last colour was presented to the regiment in Växjö by the Chief of the Army, lieutenant general, count Carl August Ehrensvärd on 6 June 1956. The new colour replaced the one from 1893. The new colour was used as regimental colour by I 11/Fo 16 until 1 September 1997. The colour is drawn by Brita Grep and embroidered by hand in insertion technique by Libraria. Blazon: "On yellow cloth the provincial badge of Småland; a red lion rampant with blue arms, in the forepaws a red crossbow with white arrowhead and black bow, string and trigger. On a red border at the upper side of the colour, battle honours (Breitenfeld 1631, Lützen 1632, Wittstock 1636, Landskrona 1677, Kliszow 1702, Warszawa 1705, Fraustadt 1706, Holovczyn 1708, Hälsingborg 1710, Valkeala 1790) in yellow".

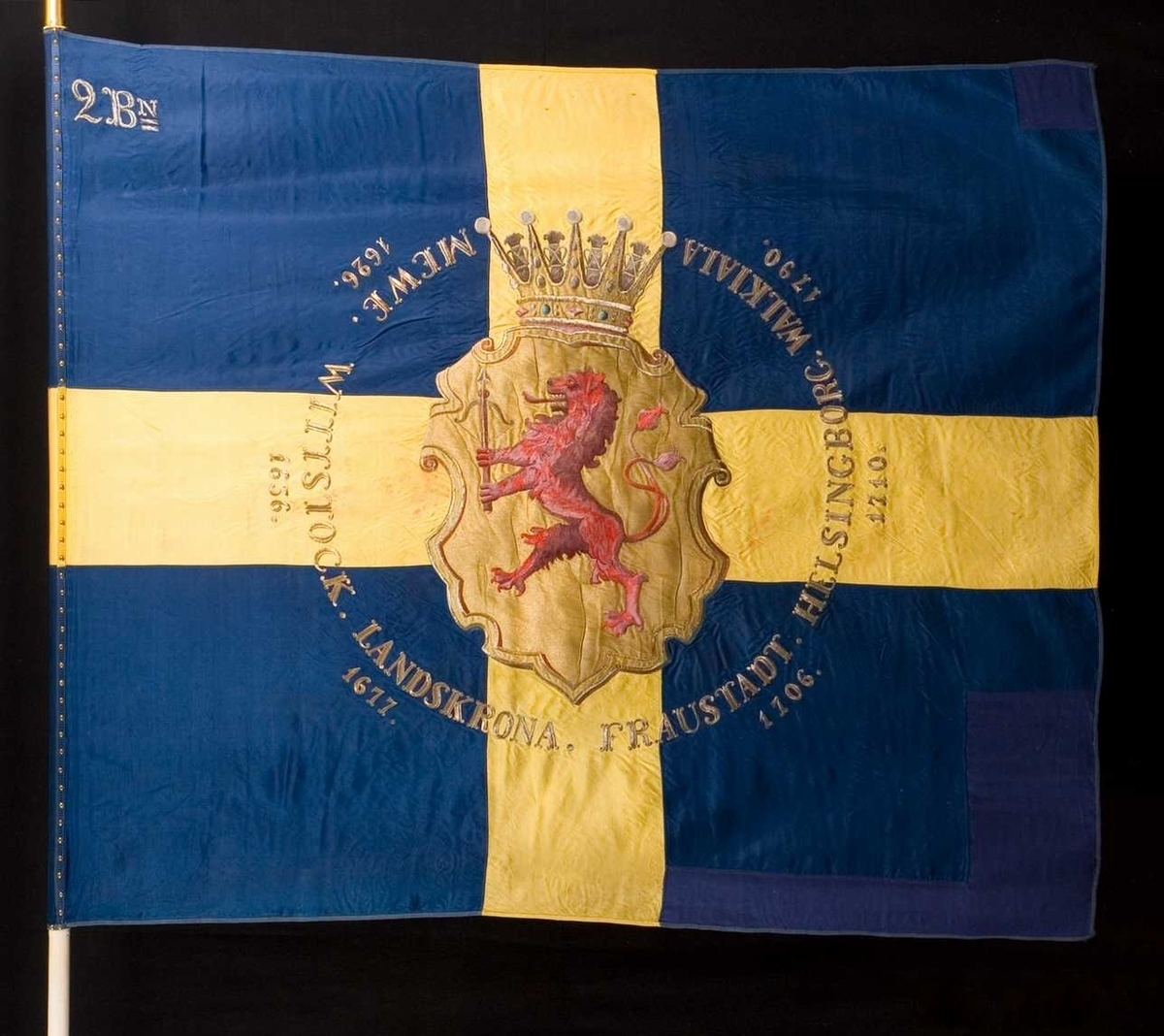
Colour model 1886-1892 of the 2nd Battalion, Kronoberg Regiment.

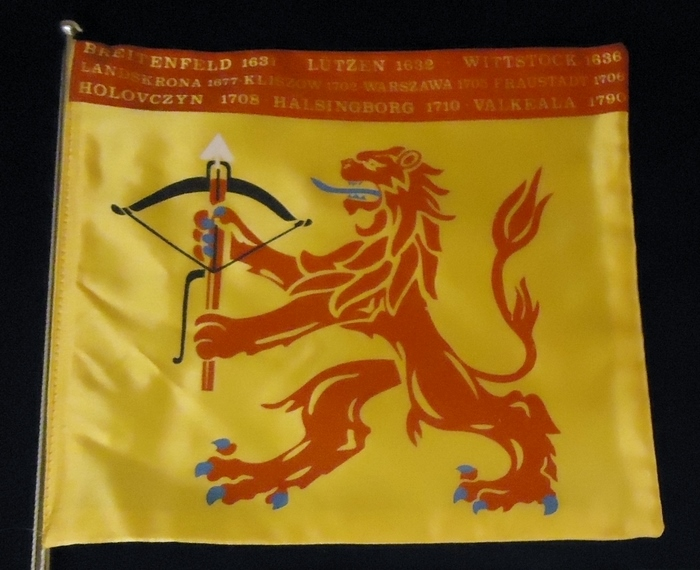
1956 table colour of Kronoberg Regiment.

=== Coat of arms ===
The coat of the arms of the Kronoberg Regiment (I 11/Fo 16) 1977–1997 and the Kronoberg Group (Kronobergsgruppen) 1997–2004. Blazon: "Or, the provincial badge of Småland, a double-tailed lion rampant gules, armed and langued azure, in the forepaws a crossbow gules, arrow-head argent, bow and string sable. The shield surmounted two muskets in saltire or".

=== Medals ===
In 1971, the Kronobergs regementes (I 11) hedersmedalj ("Kronoberg Regiment (I 11) Medal of Honour") in gold/silver/bronze (KronobregGM/SM/BM) of the 8th size was established. The medal ribbon is divided in yellow, red and yellow moiré.

In 1997, the Kronobergs regementes (I 11) minnesmedalj ("Kronoberg Regiment (I 11) Commemorative Medal") in silver (KronobregMSM) of the 8th size was established. The medal ribbon is of red moiré with two yellow stripes on each side. The ribbon is attached to a narrow pole carried by two slanting ornaments of leaves.

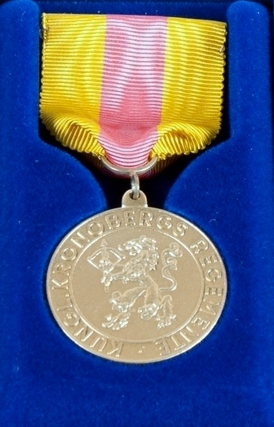
Kronoberg Regiment (I 11) Medal of Honour.

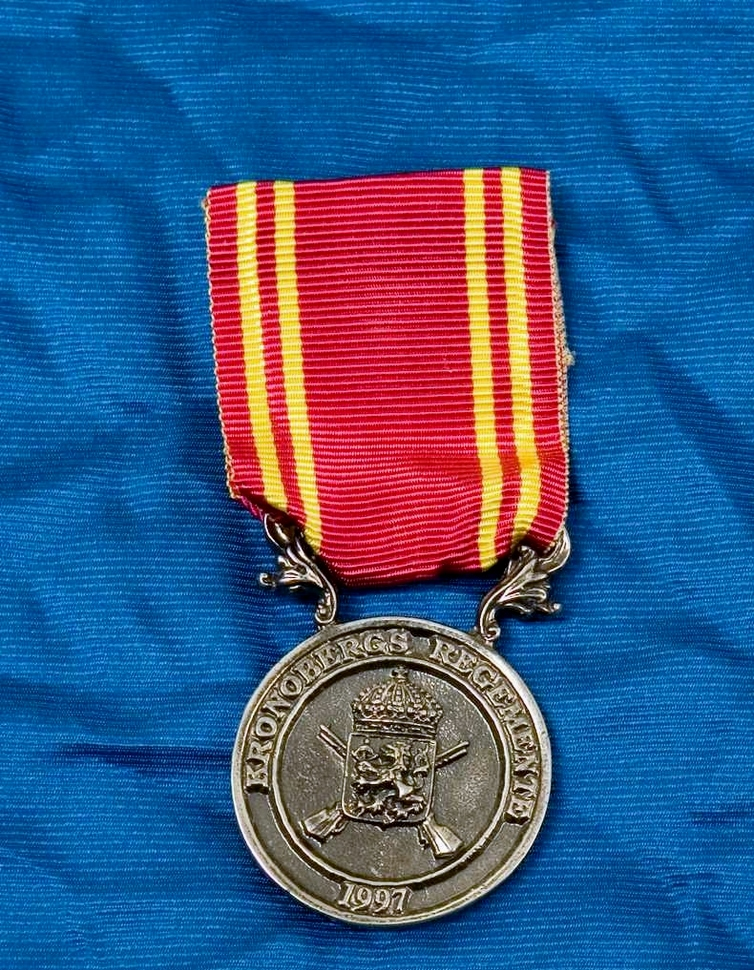
Kronoberg Regiment (I 11) Commemorative Medal.

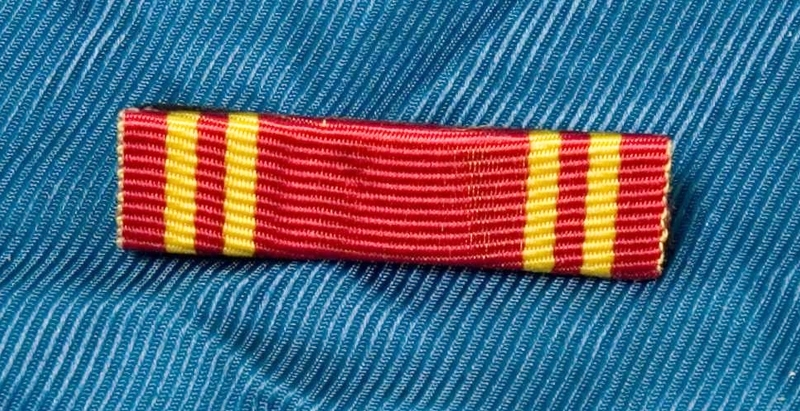
Ribbon of the Kronoberg Regiment (I 11) Commemorative Medal.

=== Heritage ===
In connection with the disbandment of the regiment through the Defence Act of 1996, its traditions came from 1 December 1998 onwards to be continued by Kronoberg Group (Kronobergsgruppen). From 1 July 2013, the Kronoberg Battalion, within Kalmar and Kronoberg Group (Kalmar- och Kronobergsgruppen) is the traditional keeper of Kronoberg Regiment.

== Commanding officers ==
Regimental commanders active at the regiment during the years 1627–1997.

=== Commanders ===
- 1627–1630: Patrik Ruthwens
- 1630–1638: Hans Drake
- 1638–1641: Adolf Hård
- 1641–1654: Georg Fleetwood
- 1654–1657: Adolf Herman Wrangel
- 1657–1665: Bertil Nilson Skytte
- 1665–1677: Henrik von Vicken
- 1677–1678: Georg Anthony Brakel
- 1678–1696: Abraham Cronhjort
- 1696–1703: Gustaf Heidenfeldt
- 1703–1706: Gabriel Lilliehöök †
- 1706–1709: Johan Cronman (POW)
- 1709–1714: Carl Hästesko (acting)
- 1714–1717: Sven Lagerberg
- 1718–1746: Eberhard Bildstein
- 1722–1727: Johan Cronman
- 1747–1746: Eberhard Bildstein
- 1746–1765: Berndt Wilhelm von Liewen
- 1765–1772: Pehr Scheffer
- 1772–1777: Otto Wilhelm von Rosen
- 1777–1782: Salomon Hederstjerna
- 1782–1812: Carl Axel Strömfelt
- 1812–1816: Elof Rosenblad
- 1816–1824: Erland Hederstjerna
- 1824–1856: Carl Henrik Wrede
- 1856–1862: Georg Miles Fleetwood
- 1862–1873: Gustaf Reinhold Weidenhielm
- 1873–1878: Otto Samuel Gustaf von Klint
- 1878–1889: Klas Hjalmar Kreüger
- 1889–1898: Henrik Esaias Anton Carl Rappe
- 1898–1905: Johan Gustaf Wikander
- 1905–1920: Gösta Hyltén-Cavallius
- 1920–1924: Gustaf Ros
- 1924–1928: Erik Nordenskjöld
- 1928–1932: Erik Grafström
- 1932–1937: Per Erlandsson
- 1937–1941: Gösta Hahr
- 1941–1946: Sven Allstrin
- 1946–1950: Gustaf Källner
- 1950–1957: Colonel Carl von Horn
- 1957–1967: Thor Cavallin
- 1967–1972: Lennart Löfgrén
- 1972–1974: Per-Hugo Winberg
- 1974–1977: Bertil Malgerud
- 1977–1980: Per-Hugo Winberg
- 1980–1983: Senior colonel Sven Skeppstedt
- 1983–1988: Finn Werner
- 1988–1989: Björn Swärdenheim
- 1989–1992: Leif Fransson
- 1993–1993: Inge Lennart Sandahl (acting)
- 1993–1997: Jan Henrik Edvard Hyltén-Cavallius

=== Deputy commanders ===
- 1978–????: Colonel Åke Lundin
- 1988–1991: Colonel Wilhelm af Donner

== Names, designations and locations ==
Name	Translation	From		To
Kungl. Kronobergs regemente	Royal Kronoberg Regiment	1623-04-16	–	1709-07-01
Kungl. Kronobergs regemente	Royal Kronoberg Regiment	1709-??-??	–	1974-06-30
Kungl. Kronobergs regemente och försvarsområde samt Kalmar försvarsområde	Royal Kronoberg Regiment and Defence District and Kalmar Defence District	1974-07-01	–	1974-12-31
Kronobergs regemente och försvarsområde samt Kalmar försvarsområde	Kronoberg Regiment and Defence District and Kalmar Defence District	1975-01-01	–	1990-06-30
Kronobergs regemente och försvarsområde	Kronoberg Regiment and Defence District	1990-07-01	–	1992-06-30
Kronobergs regemente	Kronoberg Regiment	1992-07-01	–	1997-06-30
Designation		From		To
№ 11		1816-10-01	–	1914-09-30
I 11		1914-10-01	–	1974-06-30
I 11/Fo 16/18		1974-07-01	–	1990-06-30
I 11/Fo 16		1990-07-01	–	1992-06-30
Fo 16		1992-07-01	–	1994-06-30
I 11/Fo 16		1994-07-01	–	1997-12-31
Location		From		To
Växjö Garrison		1919-11-11	–	1997-12-31

== See also ==
- List of Swedish infantry regiments
