= Östergötland Cavalry Regiment =

Swedish Army unit (1636–1791)

- Östgöta kavalleriregemente
- Active: 1636–1791
- Country: Sweden
- Branch: Swedish Army
- Type: Cavalry
- Size: Regiment
- Colours: Red
- Battle honours: None

The Östergötland Cavalry Regiment (Swedish: Östgöta kavalleriregemente) was a Swedish Army cavalry regiment. Its origin came in the 16th century. In 1791, they were merged with another unit. The regiment's soldiers were recruited from the province of Östergötland.

== History ==
The regiment has its origins in fänikor (companies) raised in Östergötland in the 16th century. In 1619, these units—along with fänikor from the nearby Jönköping County—were organised by Gustav II Adolf into Östergötlands storregemente. Sometime between 1623 and 1628, the grand regiment was permanently split into three smaller regiments, of which Östergötland Cavalry Regiment was one.

The regiment was officially raised in 1636 although it had existed since the 1620s. Östergötland Cavalry Regiment was one of the original 8 Swedish cavalry regiments mentioned in the 1634 Swedish constitution. The regiment's first commander was Hans Rotkirch. It was allotted in 1687.

Östgöta Cavalry Regiment merged with Östergötland Infantry Regiment in 1791 to form the Life Grenadier Regiment. The reorganisation and renaming to a "life grenadier" title of honour came in regard to the regiment's achievements during Gustav III's Russian War. Östgöta Cavalry Regiment was renamed to Livgrenadjärregementets rusthållsdivision and retained a degree of semi-independence.

== Organisation ==
1634(?)

- Livkompaniet
- Överstelöjtnantens kompani
- Majorens kompani
- Vadstena kompani
- Vifolka kompani
- Skänninge kompani
- Västanstångs kompani
- Tjusts kompani

17??

- Livkompaniet
- Tjusts kompani
- Linköpings kompani
- Västanstångs kompani
- Bergslags kompani
- Vifolka Klosters kompani
- Skänninge kompani
- Vadstena kompani

== Name, designation and garrison ==
Name	Translation	From		To
Östgöta kavalleriregemente	Östergötland Cavalry Regiment	1636	–	1791

Designation	From		To
No designation		–	

Training ground or garrison town	From		To
Malmen	17th century	–	1791

== See also ==
- List of Swedish regiments
- Provinces of Sweden
