= Battle of Tryškiai =

Engagement of the Great Northern War

- Part of the Great Northern War and the Swedish invasion of Poland (1701–1706)
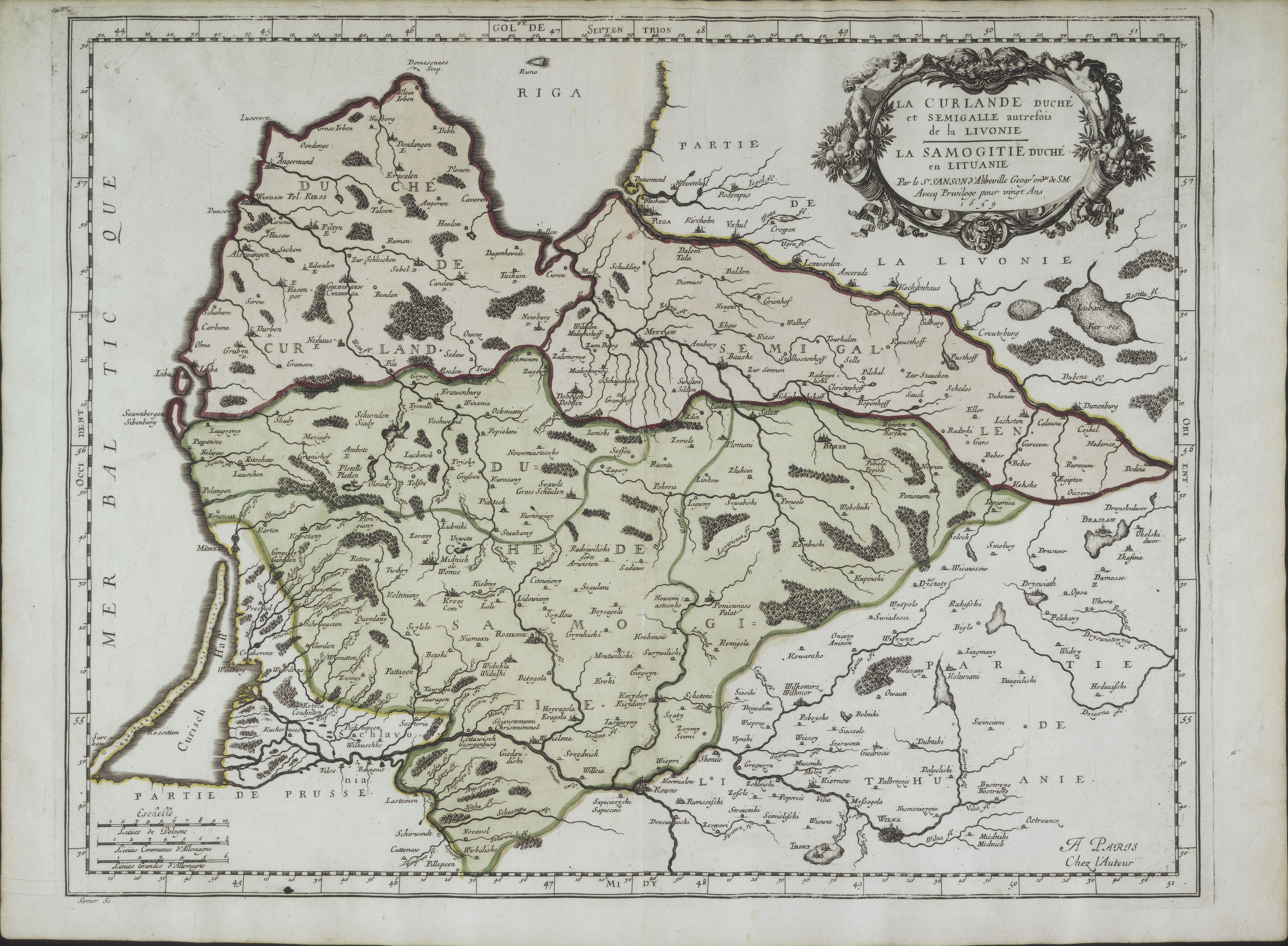
- Borders of the Duchy of Samogitia in 1659
Date	4–5 December 1701 (O.S.); 5–6 December 1701 (Swedish calendar); 15–16 December 1701 (N.S.)
Location	Tryškiai, Duchy of Samogitia, Grand Duchy of Lithuania, Polish–Lithuanian Commonwealth
Result	Swedish victory

Belligerents
Swedish Empire	Polish–Lithuanian Commonwealth

Commanders and leaders
(Swedish Empire) Charles XII	Grzegorz Antoni Ogiński

Strength
900 men	1,000–2,000 men

Casualties and losses
10 killed 18 wounded	140 killed, wounded and captured

The Battle of Tryškiai, (Tryszki or Triski), on 4–5/5–6/15–16 December 1701, was a small engagement between the Swedish forces under the command of the Swedish King Charles XII and the Polish–Lithuanian Commonwealth's forces under the command of the Polish–Lithuanian Field Hetman Grzegorz Antoni Ogiński, in the town of Tryškiai of the Duchy of Samogitia (present-day Lithuania). After the Crossing of the Düna Charles XII went into an alliance with the Sapieha family to gain his support in dethroning Augustus II the Strong from the Polish–Lithuanian throne, in exchange for protection from rival families in Samogitia, such as the Ogiński family. After initial engagements between the Swedish forces and those loyal to Grzegorz, the Swedish King personally takes command of the troops and engages Grzegorz at the town of Tryškiai; after a brief encounter, Grzegorz is forced on the run and, with Charles XII being hot on his heels, eventually retreats out of Samogitia altogether. A Swedish detachment is established at Kaunas in the Grand Duchy of Lithuania, as a sort of forward operating base before the inevitable Swedish invasion of Poland (1701–1706); further engagements, foremost the Battle of Darsūniškis, confirms the Swedish invasion. Although only a small action in a major war, the battle quickly sparked false rumours to be spread around Europe; one spoke of Charles XII's death somewhere in Lithuania, while the other mentioned a major defeat for Grzegorz, involving many thousands of participants.

== Prelude ==
The Swedish king had, ever since the Crossing of the Düna and the conquest of Courland earlier that year, contemplated actions against the Polish–Lithuanian Commonwealth to have Augustus II, whom Charles considered as too unpredictable, dethroned. In the wake of the Lithuanian power struggle the Sapieha family pleaded for Swedish protection against, among others, the Ogiński family (supported by Augustus II), which frequently raided their estates in the Duchy of Samogitia.

Charles, who sought political support within the Commonwealth, seized the opportunity and, in September, sent two contingents as protection; 600 horse under Alexander Hummerhielm, (Note: 150 men from the Life Regiment of Horse; 100 men from the Östgöta Cavalry Regiment; 150 men from the Småland Cavalry Regiment; 150 men from the Life Regiment Dragoons (1700–1721).) and 200 horse under Johan August Meijerfeldt. These were frequently being harassed by Grzegorz Antoni Ogiński's forces (the governor-general of the Duchy), as a consequence. (Note: Frequent fighting occurred; among other instances, it was reported that Meijerfeldt had been attacked by 2,000 Lithuanians at Kretinga. They had, however, been repulsed with a loss of 50 killed and some captured.) The fighting escalated as Grzegorz numbers grew larger and the two Swedish commanders soon requested reinforcements. Charles answered by assembling an additional 100 dragoons and 400 foot guards, merged the contingents together and rode out on December 12 — with only a handful of followers and without noticing the headquarters — to personally lead the combined forces in Samogitia and destroy the troubling army under Grzegorz.

== Battle ==
On December 15, the Swedish horse reached Tryškiai, (Note: The Swedish infantry, despite being on sleds, couldn't catch up with the mounted troops during the chase; they arrived only after the battle.) owned by the Ogiński family. Here they stumbled upon the rearguard of the Lithuanian army (2 companies) which escaped only after destroying the bridge leading into the town, forcing the Swedes to wade across the river; the bulk of the Lithuanian forces, with most of the inhabitants, had left the town just before the Swedish arrival. Once across, Charles set up camp and left merely 40 men in the town square as guards, (Note: A participant and volunteer in the Östgöta Cavalry Regiment, Johan Stenflycht, mentions a mere 20 in his memoirs.) additional outposts or patrols were forbidden. Just before midnight, at 23:00, Grzegorz launched a surprise attack on the sleeping Swedes; between 1,000 and 2,000 of his cavalry rushed into the town, uncontested, and caused panic by killing Swedish horses and igniting the houses. The town square, which was in danger of getting completely overwhelmed, was saved as dismounted Swedish dragoons arrived and forced the Lithuanians away.

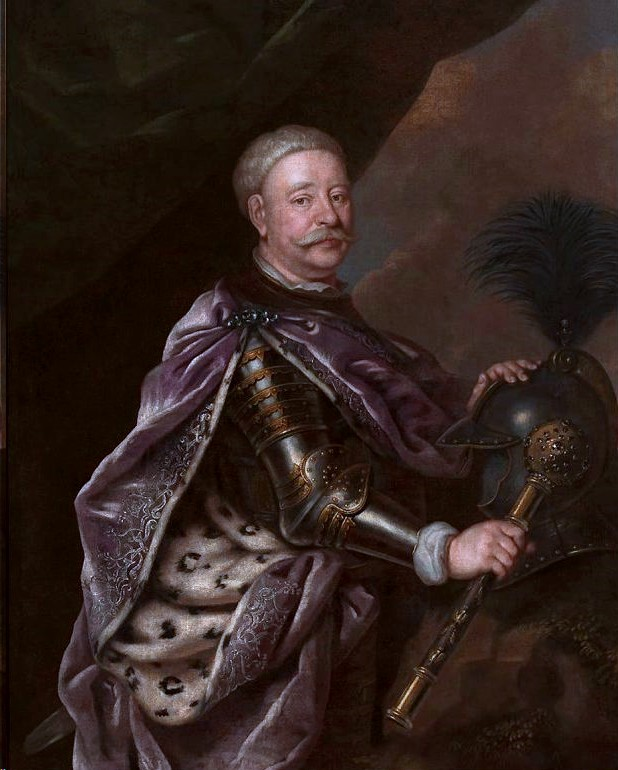
Grzegorz Antoni Ogiński in 1702, by François de la Croix

=== Grzegorz on the run ===
Soon Charles personally appeared with the bulk of the cavalry and rapidly counterattacked. The battle shifted tides as more Swedish troops mobilized and the Lithuanians had, after an hourly long struggle, been defeated; they were chased for about five kilometers before the fighting stopped. Grzegorz, who had been close to being captured — in the chaotic retreat, Swedish Lieutenant Colonel Claes Bonde (who would make a name for himself in the events leading up to the Battle of Warsaw, where he died) captured his timpani, servant and reserve horse, but was unable to capture Grzegorz himself — lost 140 men and retreated into Lithuania, towards Kaunas; a bunch of wounded Lithuanians were found on the following morning in the neighbouring villages. The Swedes, who had 10 men killed and 18 wounded, struck camp on December 17, as soon as the weather allowed and the wounded had been sent home, to give chase. Kelmė, another town owned by the Ogiński family, was ravaged and burnt down by the Swedes in their pursue of the Lithuanian hetman.

== Aftermath ==
Charles once again forced Grzegorz on the run at Kaunas, towards Vilnius, after which he left a 1,300 man strong garrison under Hummerhielm in the town, before heading back towards the main army in Courland — 280 km (174 mi) away — with only a few companions. While the complete destruction of Grzegorz' forces had failed, they had been successfully forced out of Samogitia; although they soon returned to Kaunas' vicinity and fought several skirmishes with the Swedish troops posted there. (Note: On January 17, 1702, 110 Swedish horse destroyed a pancerny company in the town of Punia, 30–40 Lithuanians died to no Swedes; three days later, 600 Cossacks attacked 80 Swedes in the same town but were repulsed with a loss of 60–70 killed to only three Swedes.) Nonetheless, an important Swedish forward operating base in Lithuania had been established in Kaunas.

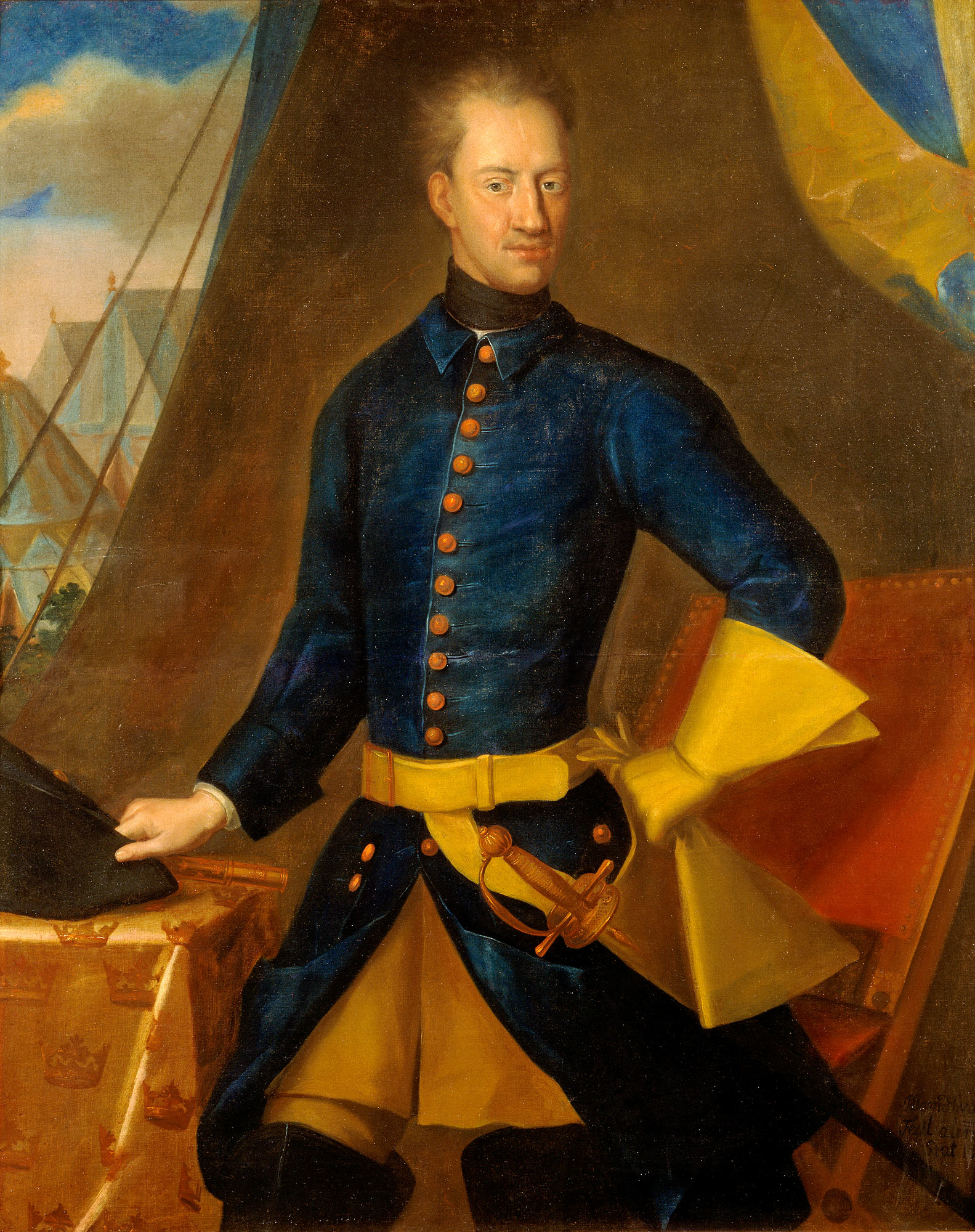
Charles XII of Sweden in 1706, by Johan David Schwartz

=== Swedish army invades ===
As Charles reached the Swedish headquarters in Courland, on January 9, 1702, he immediately ordered the main army to prepare for a march into Lithuania — and the inevitable Swedish invasion of Poland — to reinforce Hummerhielm at Kaunas, in contrast to the advice of most of his generals. (Note: During Charles' absence while chasing Grzegorz' forces in Samogitia, the Swedish main army had prepared to go into winter quarters. However, likely as a result of the recent fighting, Charles instead ordered the immediate march into Lithuania.) Hummerhielm's troops remained quite active despite being heavily outnumbered, with an insufficient amount of provisions, forage and ammunition; on March 18, he beat 12 banners of the Wiśniowiecki family — another enemy to the Sapieha's — at Jieznas, and there seized ten metal cannons, of which he could only bring back four to Kaunas. Three days later, a small party of 40 men sent out by Hummerhielm to gather supplies, was attacked at Osinitza by 1,700 men under Michał Serwacy Wiśniowiecki, the Swedes were beaten back with a loss of 17–22 men. The Swedish retaliation did not wait as Hummerhielm assembled a force of 130 cavalry and 100 infantry (Note: Or 150 cavalry and 110 infantry.) and marched against the Lithuanians to collect the remaining six guns at Jieznas; these events led to the Battle of Darsūniškis, where the Swedish cavalry was annihilated and Hummerhielm captured. The news of Hummerhielm's defeat deeply angered Charles who promptly proceeded with the advance of the Swedish army into the Commonwealth. This forced Grzegorz party to retreat to the rich-wooded areas in the northeastern Lithuania, from where he would keep harassing the Swedes who were left behind to hold Courland.

“Ego semel dic et fac”
»“Once stated, I'll do it”«

— Charles XII, March 31, 1702 (Note: Following the Battle of Darsūniškis, the Sapieha brothers, Kazimierz and Benedykt, appeared before Charles to seek protection. They had an audience with the king (in Latin) at Jurbarkas, on March 31, 1702. Charles promised not to end the war until they'd have their estates restored, in exchange for their partaking in removing Augustus; the brothers then informed Charles of its difficulties, after which he simply replied: “Ego semel dic et fac”.)

=== Rumours after the battle ===
Shortly after the battle of Tryškiai and the following chase, the Swedish main army had received rumours saying Charles XII had been killed somewhere between Kaunas and Vilnius; he had supposedly been chasing Grzegorz deep into Lithuania. On the contrary, other rumours spoke of a great battle between Charles and Ogiński's forces; the latter had, with 10,000 men (more than twice as many as the Swedes), been decisively defeated and forced on the run, after having lost 2,000 men killed. These rumours made it into several later publications, including "The History of Poland Under Augustus II", and "The History of the Wars, of His Late Majesty Charles XII, King of Sweden".

== Sources ==
=== Bibliography ===
- Brunner, Ernst (2016), Carolus Rex: Karl XII – hans liv i sanning återberättat (in Swedish), Stockholm: Albert Bonniers Förlag, ISBN 9789100160982
- Carlson, Fredrik (1885), Sveriges Historia under Carl den Tolftes Regering (in Swedish), Stockholm: P.A. Norstedt & Söner, OCLC 881561260
- Defoe, Daniel (1720), The History of the Wars, of His Late Majesty Charles XII, King of Sweden, Sweden: H. P.
- Ghelen, Giov. van (1702), Avvisi italiani, ordinarii e straordinarii, Volume 19 (in Italian), Vienna
- Lundblad, Knut (1835), Carl XII:s historia, volume I (in Swedish), Schmidt & Comp
- Parthenay, Jean-Baptiste (1734), The History of Poland Under Augustus II, volume I, Poland: W. Lewis
- Phillips, John (1702), The Present State of Europe, Or, The Historical and Political Mercury, volume 13, London: Randal Taylor, 1690-, OCLC 756927031
- Pönitz, Karl (1858), Karl XII betraktad från krigsvetenskaplig synpunkt (in Swedish), N.M. Lindhus Boktryckeri
- Rosen, Carl (1936), Bidrag till kännedom om de händelser, som närmast föregingo svenska stormaktsväldets fall, volume I (in Swedish), Stockholm: P.A. Norstedt & Söner
- Stenhammar, Waldemar (1918), Östgöta Kavalleriregemente i Karl XII:s Krig (in Swedish), Linköping: A.-B. Östgöta Correspondentens Boktryckeri, OCLC 801814346
- Uddgren, Hugo E. (1919), Karolinen Adam Ludvig Lewenhaupt hans krigföring i Kurland och Litauen 1703-1708, Volume 1 (in Swedish), Gothenburg: Elanders Boktryckeri Aktiebolag
