= Dalarna Regiment =

Swedish Army regiment

Coordinates: 60°36′21″N 15°39′06″E

- Dalregementet
- Active: 1625–1709; 1710–1713; 1713–2000; 2021–present
- Country: Sweden
- Branch: Swedish Army
- Type: Infantry
- Part of: 5th Military District (1833–1847); 4th Military District (1847–1867); 5th Military District (1867–1888); 6th Military District (1889–1893); 5th Army Division (1893–1901); V Army Division (1902–1927); Northern Army Division (1928–1936); II Army Division (1937–1943); V. milo (1943–1966); Milo B (1966–1991); Milo M (1991–2000)
- Headquarters: Falun Garrison
- Beret colour: Dark brown
- March: "Stenbocksmarschen" (Lindsten) (Note: The march was adopted on 6 June 1939 and was established in 1953 by Army Order 33/1953. The march was used by the Dalarna Brigade (Dalabrigaden) from 1994 to 2000 and by Dalarna Regiment Group (Dalregementsgruppen) from 2000.)
- Battle honours: Lützen (1632), Leipzig (1642), Lund (1676), Landskrona (1677), Narva (1700), Düna (1701), Kliszow (1702), Holovczyn (1708), Malatitze (1708), Gadebusch (1712)

Insignia
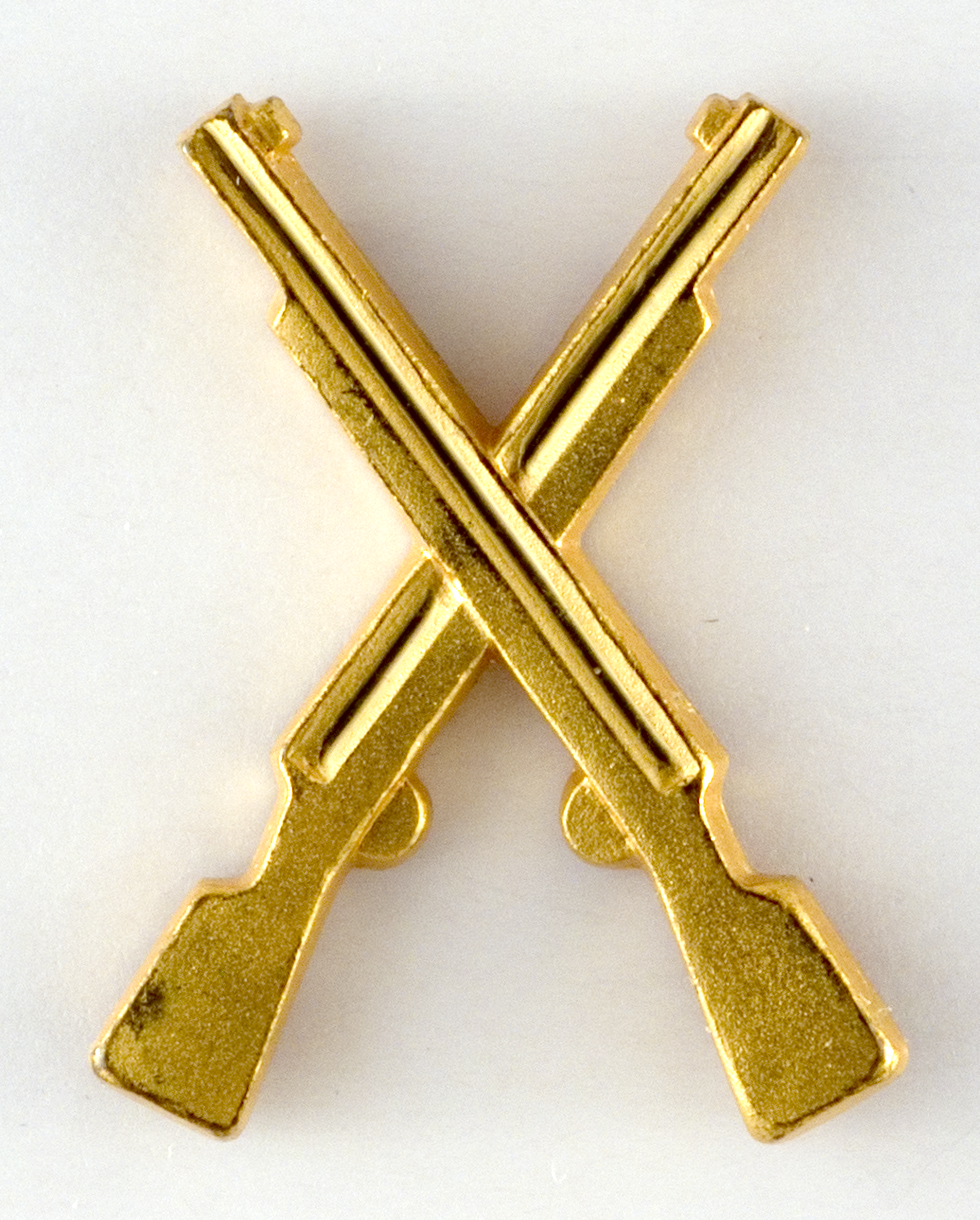
- Branch insignia m/60

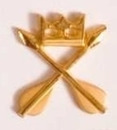
- Unit insignia m/60

The 13th Infantry Regiment or Dalarna Regiment (Swedish: Dalregementet), designation I 13, is a Swedish Army infantry unit that traced its origins back to the 16th century. The regiment's soldiers were originally recruited from the province of Dalarna, where it was later garrisoned. The unit was disbanded as a result of the disarmament policies set forward in the Defence Act of 2000. The regiment was re-raised as Dalarna Regiment (I 13) in 2021. The unit is based in Falun.

== History ==
The regiment has its origins in fänikor (companies) raised in Dalarna in 1542. During 1598, some of the units participated in the War against Sigismund and in 1605 one fänika from Dalarna fought at the Battle of Kircholm. In 1615, these units—along with fänikor from the nearby provinces of Uppland and Västmanland—were organised by Gustav II Adolf into Upplands storregemente, of which 1,400 of the total 3,000 soldiers were recruited in Dalarna. Upplands storregemente consisted of three field regiments, of which the Dalregementet was one. The Dalarna Regiment was also the first Swedish regiment to be allotted, which happened as early as in 1621. Parts of this grand regiment participated in the Polish–Swedish wars during the siege of Riga in 1621 and as garrison from 1626–1629. During this period, sometime between 1623 and 1628, the grand regiment was permanently split into three smaller regiments, of which the Dalarna Regiment was one. The regiment's first commander was Axel Oxenstierna.

The regiment was shipped to Germany and arrived at Wolgast in June 1631 to participate in the Thirty Years' War. Its first major battle was the Battle of Breitenfeld on 17 September that same year, where it stood in the first line. It also stood in the first line as part of the Swedish Brigade at the Battle of Lützen the next year, a battle which caused heavy casualties to the regiment. The regiment's "creator", Gustav II Adolf, was killed in a cavalry charge trying to ease the pressure on the Dalarna Regiment's part of the front. The regiment returned to Sweden to replenish shortly after and remained at home until 1638, when one of the regiment's two battalions was sent as garrison to Stettin. The Dalarna Regiment was one of the original 20 Swedish infantry regiments mentioned in the Swedish constitution of 1634. Carl Gustaf Wrangel was the commander from 1639 on. The second battalion was sent to Germany in 1642, and the whole regiment fought at the Battle of Leipzig that year, only to return to Sweden again the following year. They were present during the siege of Landskrona in 1644 during the short Torstenson War.

The Dalarna Regiment was shipped to Pomerania in 1655 following the outbreak of the Northern Wars. The regiment was part of the army that sieged and captured Marienburg in 1656, after which one of the battalions was sent to reinforce the garrison in Riga while the other participated in the attack on Copenhagen in 1659. In preparation for the Scanian War, one of the battalions was sent back to Germany in 1674, and was once again put under command of Carl Gustaf Wrangel, who led a thrust into Brandenburg, which ended in the Battle of Fehrbellin. The other battalion was used in Scania in the Battles of Halmstad, Lund and Landskrona in 1676–1677. A temporarily raised reserve regiment of eight companies was used against Norway in the Battle of Uddevalla.

When the Great Northern War started, the Dalarna Regiment was under the command of Magnus Stenbock and was used against Denmark but was soon sent to the Baltic region, taking part in the Battle of Narva in 1700 and the Crossing of Daugava in 1701. In 1702, the regiment received orders to join the main army at Warsaw. The regiment took part in the Battle of Kliszów, but was sent back to the Baltics for periods between 1702 and 1705. It then was subordinated to the main army that fought at Holovczyn, Malatitze and finally at the Battle of Poltava, where the regiment surrendered to the Russians. The regiment was reformed with new recruits in Sweden in 1710 and was sent to Pomerania and the Battle of Gadebusch in 1712. The Dalarna Regiment once again had to surrender, this time in 1713 after the Siege of Tönning. The regiment was reformed a second time, and took part in both the 1716 and 1718 attacks on Norway.

The next action of the regiment was in 1741 during the Hats' Russian War and the Battle of Villmanstrand, the last of the regiment's major battles. In 1758 the regiment was shipped to Pomerania yet again, this time to participate in the Seven Years' War, but the Dalarna Regiment saw no major battles during that war. In Gustav III's Russian War, the Dalarna Regiment was initially positioned along the southern Finnish coast but was later transferred to the inland, where several minor skirmishes took place during 1790. One of the battalions was involved in the First War against Napoleon, fighting minor battles against Norwegian troops which ended with the whole battalion being captured in early 1808. The final battle of the Dalarna Regiment was during the Campaign against Norway in 1814, in the Battle of Kjölbergs bro, one of the last battles Sweden fought before adopting a policy of neutrality.

The regiment was given the designation I 13 (13th Infantry Regiment) in a general order in 1816. Dalregementet was garrisoned in Falun from 1908. In 1973, the regiment gained the new designation I 13/Fo 53 as a consequence of a merge with the local defence district Fo 53. The regiment was disbanded in 2000.

The regiment was re-established on 23 October 2021, a symbolically chosen day for historical reasons. On 23 October 1642, the First Battle of Leipzig was fought, where the original Dalarna Regiment formed a brigade together with a German regiment. Dalarna Regiment was inaugurated by His Majesty the King Carl XVI Gustaf to the tunes of the Royal Swedish Army Band. The Supreme Commander of the Swedish Armed Forces, General Micael Bydén, Chief of Army, Major General Karl Engelbrektson and the Minister of Defence Peter Hultqvist also attended the inauguration.

== Campaigns ==
- The War against Sigismund (1598–1599) (Note: Participated as the various fänikor that later formed the regiment.)
- The Polish War (1600–1629)
- The Thirty Years' War (1630–1648)
- The Torstenson War (1643–1645)
- The Northern Wars (1655–1661)
- The Scanian War (1674–1679)
- The Great Northern War (1700–1721)
- The Hats' Russian War (1741–1743)
- The Seven Years' War (1757–1762)
- The Gustav III's Russian War (1788–1790)
- The First War against Napoleon (1805–1810)
- The Campaign against Norway (1814)

== Organisation ==
1634(?)

- Livkompaniet
- Överstelöjtnantens kompani
- Majorens kompani
- Orsa kompani
- Rättviks kompani
- Gagnef kompani
- Mora kompani
- Västerdals kompani

1814(?)

- Livkompaniet
- Leksands kompani
- Gagnef kompani
- Gustafs kompani
- Västerdals kompani
- Orsa kompani
- Mora kompani
- Rättviks kompani

== Heraldry and traditions ==
=== Coat of arms ===
The coat of the arms of the Dalarna Regiment (I 13/Fo 53) 1977–1994 and the Dalarna Brigade (Dalabrigaden, NB 13) 1994–2000. Blazon: "Azure, the provincial badge of Dalarna, an open crown or between two bolts of the last with points argent in saltire. The shield surmounted two muskets in saltire or". The coat of arms of the Dalarna Regiment (I 13/Fo 53) 1994–2000 and the Dalarna Group (Dalregementsgruppen) since 2000. Blazon: "Azure, the provincial badge of Dalarna, an open crown or between two bolts of the last with points argent in saltire. The shield surmounted two swords in saltire or."

Coat of arms of the Dalarna Regiment (I 13/Fo 53) 1977–1994 and the Dalarna Brigade (NB 13) 1994–2000.

Coat of the arms of the Dalarna Regiment (I 13/Fo 53) 1994–2000 and the Dalarna Group (Dalregementsgruppen) 2000–present.

=== Colours, standards and guidons ===
As an infantry regiment, the standard beret colour is a dark brown, in line with established colour used by the Swedish Infantry Troops.

The 1953 colour was presented to the regiment by His Majesty King Gustaf VI Adolf on 15 September at Dalavallen in Falun. The last regimental colour was presented to the regiment at Dalavallen in Falun by His Majesty King Carl XVI Gustaf on 28 August 1997. It was used as regimental colour by I 13/Fo 53 until 1 July 2000. The colour is drawn by Kristina Holmgård-Åkerberg and manufactured with appliqué technique by the Engelbrektssons Flag factory. Blazon: "On blue cloth the provincial badge of Dalarna; two yellow bolts in saltire with white heads and between them an open yellow crown. On a yellow border at the upper side of the colour, battle honours (Lützen 1632, Leipzig 1642, Lund 1676, Landskrona 1677, Narva 1700, Düna 1701, Kliszow 1702, Holovczyn 1708, Malatitze 1708, Gadebusch 1712) in blue."

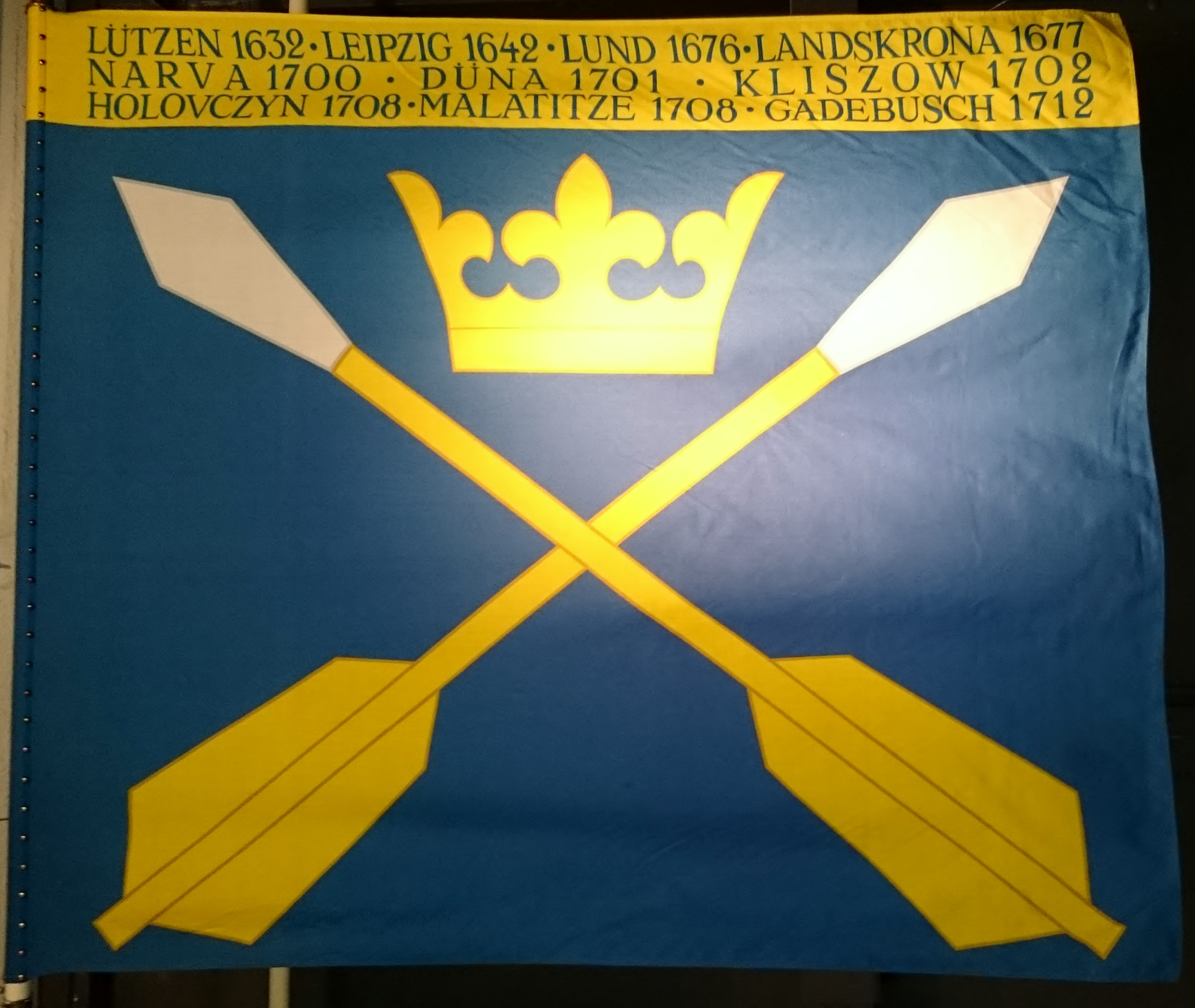
Colour of Dalarna Regiment.

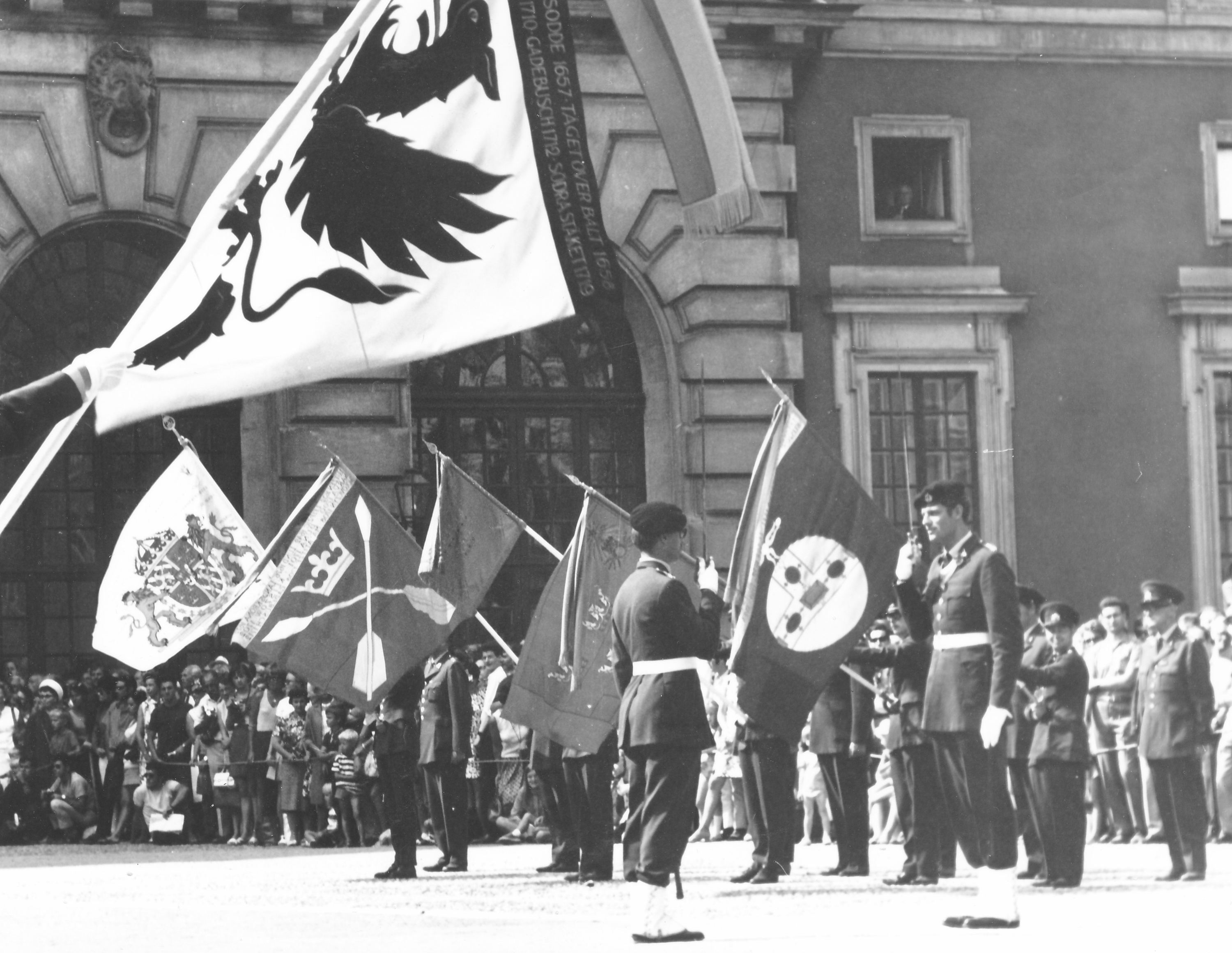
Color shown in the background at Stockholm Palace in 1969.

=== Medals ===
In 1996, the Dalregementets (I 13) förtjänstmedalj ("Dalarna Regiment (I 13) Medal for Merit") in gold, silver and bronze (DalregGM/SM/BM) of the 8th size was established. The medal ribbon is blue with two narrow yellow stripes on the middle.

In 2000, the Dalregementets (I 13) och Dalabrigadens (NB 13) minnesmedalj ("Dalarna Regiment (I 13) and Dalarna Brigade (NB 13) Commemorative Medal") in silver (DalregbrigSMM) of the 8th size was established. The medal ribbon is of blue moiré with a yellow stripe on the middle followed on both sides first by a red stripe and then by a yellow stripe.

=== Heritage ===
The old officers mess is today in its original place in the chancellery building and is run by the regiment's companion association. The Dalarna Regiment Group is the heir to the heritage and traditions of the regiment and organizationally under the Life Guards (LG). The Dalarna Regiment Group took over the colour and traditions in connection with disbandment of the regiment and the brigade on 30 June 2000. From 1 July 2013, the traditions of the regiment will be continued by the Dalarna Battalion, included in the Dalarna Regiment Group (Dalregementsgruppen).

== Commanding officers ==
Regimental commanders active at the regiment the years 1621–2000.

=== Commanders ===
- 1621–1632: Åke Oxenstierna
- 1632–1639: Johan Yxkull
- 1639–1644: Carl Gustaf Wrangel
- 1644–1650: Gustaf Adolf Lewenhaupt
- 1650–1651: Jakob Kasimir De la Gardie
- 1651–1659: Johan Bourdon
- 1659–1673: Jakob von Wulfven
- 1673–1683: Hans Abraham Kruuse af Verchou
- 1683–1689: Carl Svinhufvud
- 1689–1696: Gustaf Heydenfelt
- 1696–1698: Bernhard von Liewen
- 1698–1700: Gustaf Anrep
- 1700–1706: Magnus Stenbock
- 1706–1709: Gustaf Henrik von Siegroth †
- 1710–1719: Magnus Julius De la Gardie
- 1719–1735: Carl Fredrik Tegensköld
- 1735–1740: Johan Fredrik Didron
- 1740–1750: Axel Johan Gripenhielm
- 1750–1768: Gustaf Henrik Mannerheim
- 1768–1777: Carl Hierta
- 1777–1781: Johan Beck-Friis
- 1781–1785: Gustaf Duwall
- 1785–1794: Wilhelm Mauritz Klingspor
- 1794–1801: Georg Henrik von Wright
- 1801–1804: Gustaf Gyllengranat
- 1804–1813: Thure Gustaf Cederström
- 1813–1820: Carl Pontus Gahn
- 1820–1835: Carl Albrecht Leijonflyckt
- 1835–1852: Henrik Wilhelm Örn
- 1852–1868: Johan Fredrik Söderhielm
- 1868–1874: Lars Gustaf Tegnér
- 1874–1885: Herman David Krautmeyer
- 1885–1894: Gustaf Toll
- 1894–1898: Charles von Oelreich
- 1894–1898: Carl Vilhelm Knut von Rosen (acting)
- 1898–1903: Carl Gustaf Hult
- 1903–1910: Johan Gustaf Fabian Wrangel
- 1910–1916: Fredrik Björkman
- 1916–1926: Axel A:son Sjögreen
- 1926–1933: Rikard Salwén
- 1933–1940: Anders Andén
- 1940–1944: Colonel Ivar Backlund
- 1944–1951: Olof Häger
- 1951–1958: Erik Drakenberg
- 1958–1962: Bengt Carl Olof Hjelm
- 1962–1971: Bror von Vegesack
- 1971–1979: Hans Lodin
- 1979–1982: Senior colonel Clarence Jonsson
- 1982–1989: Fredrik Gyllenram
- 1989–1996: Lars Erik Verner Wallén
- 1996–2000: Rolf Dahlström
- 2000–2021: –
- 2021–20xx: Ronny Modigs

=== Deputy commanders ===
- 1978–1982: Fredrik Gyllenram

== Attributes ==
Name	Translation	From		To
Kungl. Dalregementet	Royal Dalarna Regiment	1625-??-??	–	1709-06-28
Kungl. Dalregementet	Royal Dalarna Regiment	1710-??-??	–	1713-05-06
Dalregementet	Dalarna Regiment	1975-01-01	–	2000-06-30
Avvecklingsorganisation Falun	Decommissioning Organisation Falun	2000-07-01	–	2001-03-31
Dalregementet	Dalarna Regiment	2021-10-23	–	
Designation		From		To
No. 13		1816-10-01	–	1914-09-30
I 13		1914-10-01	–	1973-06-30
I 13/Fo 53		1973-07-01	–	2000-06-30
I 13		2021-10-23	–	
Location		From		To
Rommehed		1796-??-??	–	1908-10-10
Falun Garrison		1909-01-29	–	2001-03-31
Falun Garrison		2021-10-23	–	

== See also ==
- List of Swedish infantry regiments
