= Upplands storregemente =

- Active: 1617, 1623-1626
- Country: Sweden
- Allegiance: Gustavus Adolphus
- Type: mixed regiment or brigade

Upplands storregemente or Landsregementet i Uppland (Uppland Grand Regiment, Regiment of the Land in Uppland) was one of the nine grand regiments organized by Gustavus Adolphus in the late 1610s and split into smaller regiments in the 1620s.

== History ==
Raised in Svealand from smaller units of 500 men called fänikor, more specifically from the provinces of Uppland, Dalarna and Västmanland, in 1617 and counting 3,000 men. The regiment had six fänikor in 1617. The grand regiment was in turn organized into three field regiments (fältregementen) and a cavalry regiment, thus actually being more like a brigade in spite of the name.

The regiment did not take part in any campaign during its short lifetime. The grand regiments of Sweden where reorganized during the early 1620s to consist of three field regiments, each of eight companies of 150 men, thus making the total number 3,600 soldiers per grand regiment. It is unsure whether or not the cavalry regiment was included in the total number.

Between 1623 and 1626, the regiment was split into four smaller regiments, Uppland Regiment, Västmanland Regiment, Dalarna Regiment and Upplands ryttare.

== Campaigns ==
- None.

== Organization ==
Before being split, the regiment was organized as follows:

- 1:a fältregementet (1st Field Regiment)
  - 8 companies from Dalarna
- 2:a fältregementet (2nd Field Regiment)
  - 8 companies from Uppland
- 3:e fältregementet (3rd Field Regiment)
  - 6 companies from Västmanland
  - 2 companies from Dalarna
- Kavalleriregementet (Cavalry Regiment)
  - 8 companies from Uppland

== See also ==
- List of Swedish regiments
- List of Swedish wars
- History of Sweden
- Provinces of Sweden
