= Norrlands storregemente =

- Active: 1615–1624
- Country: Sweden
- Allegiance: Gustavus Adolphus
- Type: mixed regiment/brigade
- Size: 3,000

Commanders
- Current commander: Svante Banér

Norrlands storregemente or Landsregementet i Norrland (Norrland Grand Regiment, the Land Regiment in Norrland) was one of the nine grand regiments organized by Gustavus Adolphus in the late 1610s and split into smaller regiments in the 1620s.

== History ==
Raised in Norrland from smaller units of 500 men called fänikor, more specifically from the provinces of Västerbotten, Ångermanland, Medelpad, Hälsingland and Gästrikland, in 1615 and counting 3,000 men. In 1617, the regiment was led by Svante Banér and consisted of seven fänikor. The grand regiment was in turn organized into three field regiments (fältregementen), thus actually being more like a brigade in spite of the name.

One of the field regiments was used in 1621 in the war against Poland and was present at the siege of Riga between 10 August and 13 September with eight companies of 150 men each. The grand regiments of Sweden were reorganized during the period to consist of three field regiments, each of eight companies of 150 men, thus making the total number 3,600 soldiers per grand regiment.

Jakob Duwall was commander of the regiment in 1624. During the same year, the grand regiment was split into three smaller regiments, Västerbotten Regiment, Hälsinge Regiment, and the third regiment was transferred to the navy.

== Campaigns ==
- One field regiment on expedition in 1621 to Livonia during the Polish War.

== Organization ==
Before being split, the regiment was organized as follows:

- 1:a fältregementet (1st Field Regiment)
  - 6 companies from Hälsingland
  - 1 company from Medelpad
  - 1 company from Gästrikland
- 2:a fältregementet (2nd Field Regiment)
  - 3 companies from Ångermanland
  - 2 companies from Hälsingland
  - 2 companies from Gästrikland
  - 1 company from Medelpad
- 3:e fältregementet (3rd Field Regiment)
  - 7 companies from Västerbotten
  - 1 company from Ångermanland

== See also ==
- List of Swedish regiments
- List of Swedish wars
- History of Sweden
- Provinces of Sweden
