= Södermanlands storregemente =

- Active: 1614, 1622-1624
- Country: Sweden
- Allegiance: Gustavus Adolphus
- Type: mixed regiment or brigade

Södermanlands storregemente or Landsregementet i Södermanland (Södermanland Grand Regiment, Regiment of the Land in Södermanland) was one of the nine grand regiments organized by Gustavus Adolphus in 1614 with foot soldiers from Värmland and Närke. This unit was divided as early as 1627, one of which later became the Södermanland Regiment.

== History ==
Raised in Svealand from smaller units of 500 men called fänikor, more specifically from the provinces of Södermanland, Närke and Värmland, in 1614 and counting 3,000 men. The grand regiment was in turn organized into three field regiments (fältregementen) and a cavalry regiment, thus actually being more like a brigade in spite of the name.

The Scot Alexander Leslie led the regiment between 1622 and 1624. The grand regiments of Sweden where reorganized during the period to consist of three field regiments, each of eight companies of 150 men, thus making the total number 3,600 soldiers per grand regiment. It is unsure whether or not the cavalry regiment was included in the total number.

Between 1624 and 1627, the regiment was split into three smaller regiments, Södermanlands regemente, Närkes regemente and Värmlands regemente (these two were soon after merged into the Närke-Värmland Regiment) and the cavalry unit Svenska adelsfanan.

== Campaigns ==
- None.

== Organization ==
Before being split, the regiment was organized as follows:

- 1:a fältregementet (1st Field Regiment)
  - 5 companies from Närke
  - 3 companies from Vadsbo-Valle Härad (in Västergötland)
- 2:a fältregementet (2nd Field Regiment)
  - 8 companies from Värmland
- 3:e fältregementet (3rd Field Regiment)
  - 8 companies from Södermanland
- Kavalleriregementet (Cavalry Regiment)
  - 10 companies from different parts of Sweden

== See also ==
- List of Swedish regiments
- List of Swedish wars
- History of Sweden
- Provinces of Sweden
