= Östergötlands storregemente =

- Active: 1618–1623
- Country: Sweden
- Allegiance: Gustavus Adolphus
- Type: mixed regiment or brigade

Östergötlands storregemente or Landsregementet i Östergötland (Östergötland Grand Regiment, Regiment of the Land in Östergötland) was one of the nine grand regiments organized by Gustavus Adolphus in the late 1610s and split into smaller regiments in the 1620s.

== History ==
Raised in Götaland from smaller units of 500 men called fänikor, more specifically from the province of Östergötland and in the county of Jönköping, in 1618 and counting 3,000 men (at the time, it counted 2,176 men). The grand regiment was in turn organized into three field regiments (fältregementen) and a cavalry regiment, thus actually being more like a brigade in spite of the name.

The regiment did not take part in any campaign during its short lifetime. In 1616-1617 the cavalry regiment was deployed in Swedish-occupied Novgorod. The grand regiments of Sweden where reorganized during the early 1620s to consist of three field regiments, each of eight companies of 150 men, thus making the total number 3,600 soldiers per grand regiment. It is unsure whether or not the cavalry regiment was included in the total number.

In 1623, the regiment was split into three smaller regiments, Östergötland Infantry Regiment, Jönköping Regiment and Östergötland Cavalry Regiment.

== Campaigns ==
- None.

== Organization ==
Before being split, the regiment was organized as follows:

- 1:a fältregementet (1st Field Regiment)
  - 6 companies from Östergötland
  - 2 companies from Jönköping County
- 2:a fältregementet (2nd Field Regiment)
  - 8 companies from Jönköping County
- 3:e fältregementet (3rd Field Regiment)
  - 3 companies from Östergötland
  - 1 company from Jönköping County
  - 1 company from Västergötland
  - 3 companies "Vacant"
- Kavalleriregementet (Cavalry Regiment)
  - 8 companies from Östergötland

== See also ==
- List of Swedish regiments
- List of Swedish wars
- History of Sweden
- Provinces of Sweden
