= I21 =

I21 or I-21 may refer to:

- Japanese submarine I-21, an Imperial Japanese Navy submarine completed in 1941 and sunk in 1943
- Japanese submarine I-121, named I-21 from 1924 to 1938, an Imperial Japanese Navy submarine completed in 1927 and scuttled in 1946,
- Närke Regiment (1816–1892), a Swedish infantry regiment, split from the Närke-Värmland Regiment
- Kalmar Regiment (1893–1927), a Swedish infantry regiment
- Västernorrland Regiment (1928–1974), a Swedish infantry regiment
