= Smålands storregemente =

- Active: 1616-1624
- Country: Sweden
- Allegiance: Gustavus Adolphus
- Type: mixed regiment or brigade

Smålands storregemente or Landsregementet i Småland (Småland Grand Regiment, Regiment of the Land in Småland) was one of the nine grand regiments organized by Gustavus Adolphus in the late 1610s and split into smaller regiments in the 1620s.

== History ==
Raised in Götaland from smaller units of 500 men called fänikor, more specifically from the province of Småland and the counties of Kalmar and Kronoberg, in 1616 and counting 3,000 men. The regiment had seven fänikor and 2,478 men in 1618 under the command of Herman Wrangel. The grand regiment was in turn organized into three field regiments (fältregementen) and a cavalry regiment, thus actually being more like a brigade in spite of the name.

The regiment did not take part in any campaign during its short lifetime. The grand regiments of Sweden where reorganized during the early 1620s to consist of three field regiments, each of eight companies of 150 men, thus making the total number 3,600 soldiers per grand regiment. It is unsure whether or not the cavalry regiment was included in the total number.

In 1623, the regiment was split into three smaller regiments, Kronoberg Regiment, Kalmar Regiment and Småland Cavalry Regiment.

== Campaigns ==
- None.

== Organization ==
Before being split, the regiment was organized as follows:

- 1:a fältregementet (1st Field Regiment)
  - 8 companies from Kalmar County
- 2:a fältregementet (2nd Field Regiment)
  - 8 companies from Kronoberg County
- 3:e fältregementet (3rd Field Regiment)
  - 4 companies from Kalmar County
  - 4 companies from Kronoberg County
- Kavalleriregementet (Cavalry Regiment)
  - 8 companies from Småland

== See also ==
- List of Swedish regiments
- List of Swedish wars
- History of Sweden
- Provinces of Sweden
