= Tryškiai =

Town in Samogitia Region, Lithuania

- Town
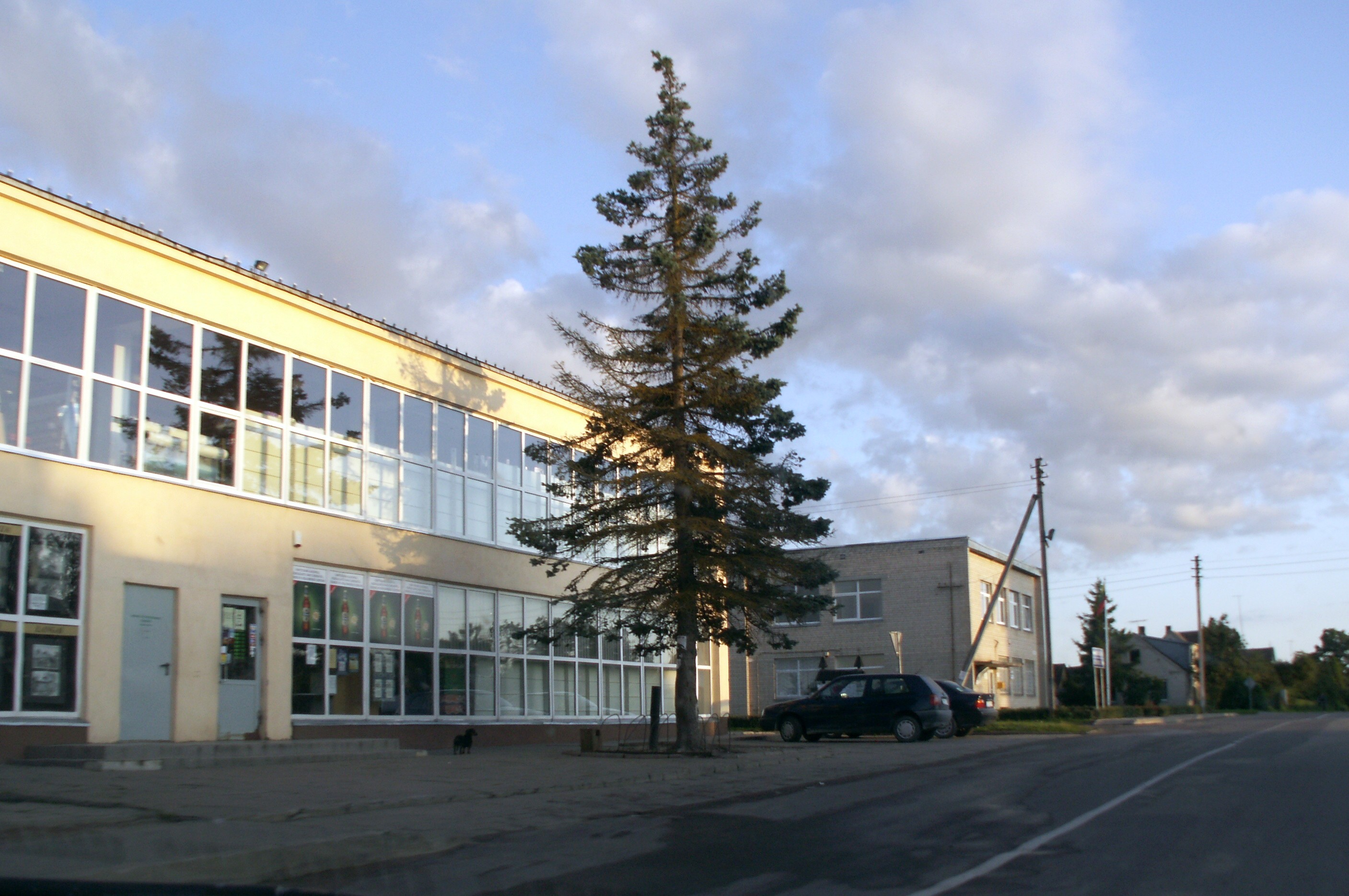

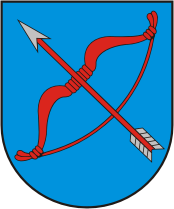
- Coat of arms

- Location within Lithuania
- Coordinates: 56°03′10.8″N 22°34′51.6″E
- Country: Lithuania
- Ethnographic region: Samogitia
- County: Telšiai County

Population (2022)
  - Total: 1,060
- Time zone: UTC+2 (EET)
  - Summer (DST): UTC+3 (EEST)

Tryškiai (Samogitian: Trīškē, Polish: Tryszki, Yiddish: טרישיק, romanized: Trishki) is a small town in Telšiai district municipality, Lithuania with a population of about 1,000.

== History ==
In late July 1941, 70 to 80 Jewish men were killed on the banks of the Virvyte in a mass execution perpetrated by an Einsatzgruppen of Germans and Lithuanian nationalists. In the beginning of August the women were told that they would join their husbands, but they were led to Gruzdžiai and there, they were left in an open field without any shelter and were abused by the Lithuanian guards. A week later, in the middle of August, they were brought to the Zhager ghetto. On October 2, 1941, they were murdered in the Narishkin estate with 3,000 Jews from Zagare and the surrounding towns.
