= List of Swedish regiments =

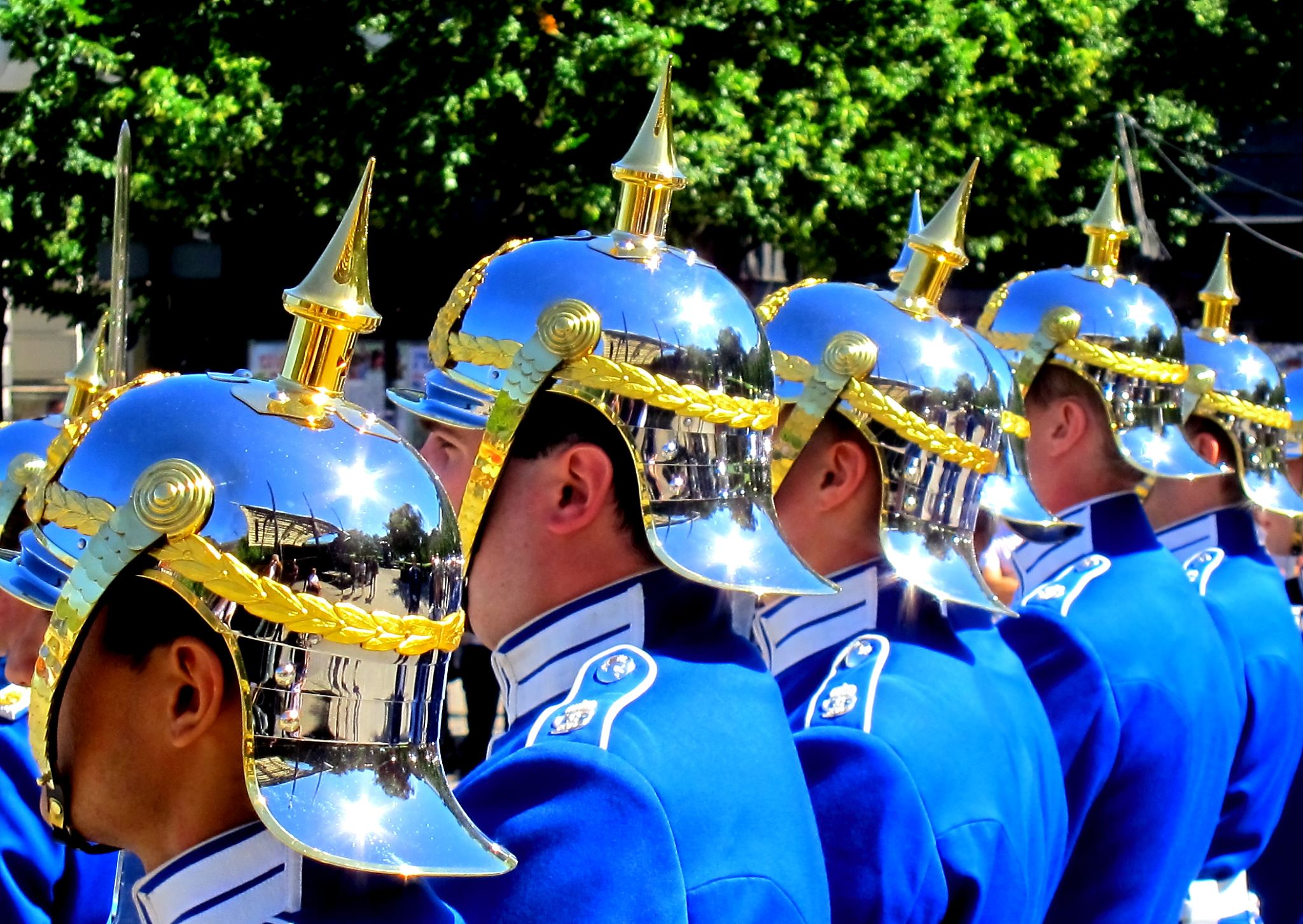
Members of the Royal Guards.

This is a list of Swedish regiments. Most formations have changed names several times during their existence. Listed here are commonly used names.

Regiments were the highest organized organic units in the Swedish Army from the time of Gustavus Adolphus on to the Second World War. In 1949, the Swedish Army was reorganised, with the regiments being used as training units for conscripts during peacetime. The new main fighting unit was the brigade, only organised in wartime (with a few exceptions). The division (fördelning) is not a static organization, but can have brigades assigned and removed when needed, similar to other countries' corps formations.

Regiments are most commonly used in the context of the Swedish Army with the exception of the coastal artillery and naval infantry which belongs to the Swedish Navy.

== Grand regiments ==
Storregementen or landsregementen (regiments of the land), these regiments were organized by Gustavus Adolphus in the end of the 1610s from the smaller units fänika and fana raised in the various parts of Sweden during the time of Gustav Vasa:

- Norrlands storregemente (Norrland Grand Regiment)
- Upplands storregemente (Uppland Grand Regiment)
- Södermanlands storregemente (Södermanland Grand Regiment)
- Östergötlands storregemente (Östergötland Grand Regiment)
- Västergötlands storregemente (Västergötland Grand Regiment)
- Smålands storregemente (Småland Grand Regiment)
- Finlands storregemente (Österbotten Grand Regiment)
- Karelska storregementet (Karelian Grand Regiment)
- Västra Finlands storregemente (Western Finland Grand Regiment)
- Mellersta Finlands storregemente (Middle Finland Grand Regiment)
- Östra Finlands storregementet (Eastern Finland Grand Regiment)

=== Västergötlands storregemente ===
Västergötlands storregemente or Landsregementet i Västergötland (Västergötland Grand Regiment, Regiment of the Land in Västergötland) was one of the nine grand regiments.

Raised in Götaland from smaller units of 500 men called fänikor, more specifically from the provinces of Västergötland and Dalsland and the counties of Skaraborg and Älvsborg, in 1613 and counting 3,000 men. The grand regiment was in turn organized into three field regiments (fältregementen) and a cavalry regiment, thus actually being more like a brigade in spite of the name.

The regiment did not take part in any campaign during its short lifetime. The grand regiments of Sweden where reorganized during the early 1620s to consist of three field regiments, each of eight companies of 150 men, thus making the total number 3,600 soldiers per grand regiment. It is unsure whether or not the cavalry regiment was included in the total number.

Between 1621 and 1624, the regiment was split into four smaller regiments, Skaraborg Regiment, Älvsborg Regiment, Västergötland-Dalsland Regiment and Västergötland Cavalry Regiment.

Before being split, the regiment was organized as follows:

- 1:a fältregementet (1st Field Regiment)
  - 5 companies from Skaraborg County
  - 3 companies from Älvsborg County
- 2:a fältregementet (2nd Field Regiment)
  - 5 companies from Älvsborg County
  - 3 companies from Skaraborg County
- 3:e fältregementet (3rd Field Regiment)
  - 4 companies from Älvsborg County
  - 4 companies from Dalsland
- Kavalleriregementet (Cavalry Regiment)
  - 8 companies from Västergötland

== Historical regiments ==
The original provincial regiments (landskapsregementen) were raised by splitting the old grand regiments, forming 20 infantry (actually 21 as Smålands regemente was split into Kronobergs and Jönköpings regemente) and eight cavalry regiments as written in the Swedish constitution of 1634. As time went on, new regiments were raised by conscription, created by splitting old regiments or enlisting soldiers from various dominions of Sweden. There were also times when temporary regiments were raised; these regiments were called männingsregementen.

== List of active Swedish regiments ==
This is a list of currently active regiments.

Designation	Name	Type of unit
LG	Life Guards (Livgardet)	Infantry/Cavalry
I 13	Dalarna Regiment (Dalregementet)	Infantry
I 19	Norrbotten Regiment (Norrbottens regemente)	Armour
I 21	Västernorrland Regiment (Västernorrlands regemente)	Infantry
Amf 1	Stockholm Marine Regiment (Stockholms amfibieregemente)	Marine infantry
Amf 4	Älvsborg Marine Regiment (Älvsborgs amfibieregemente)	Marine infantry
K 3	Life Regiment Hussars (Livregementets husarer)	Cavalry (Airmobile infantry)
K 4	Norrland Dragoon Regiment (Norrlands dragonregemente)	Cavalry (Army rangers)
A 8	Boden Artillery Regiment (Bodens artilleriregemente)	Artillery
A 9	Bergslagen Artillery Regiment (Bergslagens artilleriregemente)	Artillery
P 4	Skaraborg Regiment (Skaraborgs regemente)	Armour
P 7	South Scanian Regiment (Södra skånska regementet)	Armour
P 18	Gotland Regiment (Gotlands regemente)	Armour
Lv 6	Air Defence Regiment (Luftvärnsregementet)	Air defense
Ing 2	Göta Engineer Regiment (Göta ingenjörregemente)	Engineer
LedR	Command and Control Regiment (Ledningsregementet)	Command & Control/Signals
T 2	Göta Logistic Regiment (Göta trängregemente)	Logistics

== See also ==
- Swedish Armed Forces
- Military district
- List of Swedish defence districts
- List of Swedish wars
- List of Swedish Army brigades

== Sources ==
Print

- Braunstein, Christian (2003). Sveriges arméförband under 1900-talet. Stockholm: Statens Försvarshistoriska Museer. ISBN 91-971584-4-5
- Holmberg, Björn (1993). Arméns regementen, skolor och staber: en sammanställning. Arvidsjaur: Svenskt Militärhistoriskt Bibliotek. ISBN 91-972209-0-6
- Nelsson, Bertil (1993). Från Brunkeberg till Nordanvind: 500 år med svenskt infanteri. Stockholm: Probus. ISBN 91-87184-23-0
- Nordisk Familjebok: första utgåvan. (1876–1899). Stockholm: Expeditionen af Nordisk familjebok. Online version at Projekt Runeberg
- Nordisk Familjebok: uggleupplagan. (1904–1926). Stockholm: Nordisk familjeboks förlag. Online version at Projekt Runeberg
- Svensk rikskalender 1908. (1908). Stockholm: P.A. Norstedt & Söner. Online version at Projekt Runeberg

Online

- Holmén, Pelle, & Sjöberg, Jan (2004). Swedish Armed Forces 1900-2000. Retrieved Dec. 14, 2004.
- Högman, Hans (2001). Militaria - Svensk militärhistoria. Retrieved Dec. 14, 2004.
- Persson, Mats (1998). Swedish Army Regiments. Retrieved Dec. 14, 2004.
- Sharman, Ken (2000). Swedish military administrative division as per 1629. Retrieved Dec. 14, 2004.
