= Allotment system =

Army system in Sweden

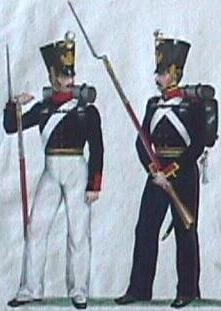
Drawing of Swedish soldiers belonging to the "new" allotment system and wearing uniforms of the 1830s

The allotment system (Swedish: indelningsverket; Finnish: ruotujakolaitos) was a system used in Sweden for keeping a trained army at all times. This system came into use in around 1640, and was replaced by the modern Swedish Armed Forces conscription system in 1901. Two different allotment systems have been in use in Sweden; they are the old allotment system (äldre indelningsverket) and the new allotment system (yngre indelningsverket), the latter often referred to as just "the allotment system". The soldiers who were part of these systems were known as "croft soldiers" (indelta soldater, the Swedish term, does not have the same meaning) due to the small crofts allotted to them.

Originally, the allotment system was the name for a system used to pay servants of the state, like officers and clergy. It was introduced because of an often felt shortage of money, and the allotment system tried to solve this by localising taxes; meaning that payment consisted of an individual's right to collect certain taxes. Later on it referred to an organisation created to provide soldiers to the armed forces, properly known as det ständiga knektehållet (literally "the permanent soldier household"). The reason for this development of the term is that a large part of the allotment system was used to support det ständiga knektehållet.

== Background ==
After the Swedish secession from the Kalmar Union in 1523, the infantry of the Swedish Army consisted of conscripted soldiers and enlisted mercenaries, both of whom would be called up in wartime only. The units were disbanded in peacetime to reduce costs, and only a few garrison units were present in towns and fortresses. This made it impossible to quickly mobilise a trained army. At the same time, land tax exemption (frälse) was given to those who equipped horsemen for cavalry service, according to the Decree of Alsnö. Coastal defence was provided by several skeppslag (literally "ship teams"), a number of farms located in a coastal district that had to furnish both ships and shipmen for service. After the birth of the Swedish Navy in 1522, the system for recruiting shipmen was changed to rely on forced conscription.

== Old system ==
In the 16th century, the system was changed with regard to both cavalry (1536) and infantry (1544), to provide an army that could be quickly mobilized. This was still done through impressment for the infantry, and tax exemptions for those who financed horsemen. The new system gave the conscripted soldiers a means of subsistence between campaigns, by making a whole group of farmers responsible for the keep of each soldier. While the soldiers would be hired and salaried full-time if at war, they lived at home and off duty in peacetime. This meant that it would always be possible to raise a trained army in case of war.

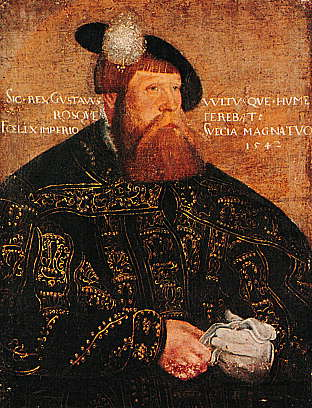
Gustav Vasa, founder of the old allotment system

The impressment of the foot soldiers was called utskrivning (literally "writing out"), and was based on a grouping, called a rote (similar to an English "file" or "ward"; in the eastern parts of the Swedish realm, this became the Finnish ruotu), of ten men from an estate or a few farms, fit for military service and between the ages of 15 and 40. One randomly chosen man from each rote was forced to serve in the province's or county's regiment in case of war.

The organisation of the cavalry was based on a slightly different grouping. This grouping was known as a rusthåll (literally "arm household"), a bigger farm or estate (practically a peasant manor) that could support a horseman with his horse and equipment in exchange for tax exemption. The horseman who volunteered for service was often the estate master himself or a close relative. This option resembled the medieval origin of knighthood but no longer carried the Swedish noble status with it, as the cavalryman was not permanently stationed in war, but was allowed to remain home at peacetime. In particular cases, the estate owner received some taxes from neighbours to augment his own tax exemption: as the burden of a cavalryman with horse and equipment was deemed considerable, compensation needed to be commensurate.

The infantry was organized in units of 525 (later 300) men called a landsfänika and the cavalry in units of 300 horsemen called a landsfana. Later on, this was changed to a company—battalion—regiment organisation. The system, used and refined by Gustav Vasa and Gustavus Adolphus, was later to be known as the old allotment system. Many people disliked forced conscription, though, and the peasantry in some provinces soon wrote contracts with the state to provide a certain number of soldiers in exchange for being spared from conscription.

There were a number of reasons for the dislike of the system. First, any of the ten men in each rote could be picked to serve in case of war, which made it hard for the generals to estimate the knowledge and level of practice their soldiers would have. Secondly, the richest of the men in the rote could buy their way out, which in turn sometimes led to the "10th man" being the poorest or weakest in the rote, which of course was not good for the army. The system of forced conscription also often led to desertions.

== New system ==
=== Foot ===
A complete reorganisation of the military system was made at the end of the 17th century. In 1682 Charles XI decided to reorganise the army, and introduced the new allotment system, often referred to as just "the allotment system". The system was to remain in effect for over 200 years. One of the main reasons for the reorganisation was the bad condition the army had been in during the Scanian War (1674–1679). In this system, the overall structure of the old system was retained, but contracts such as those described above were used instead of forced conscription. Contracts were written with counties and provinces, stating that they would have to raise and supply a regiment of 1,000 or 1,200 men in both wartime and peacetime. Usually, four farms (there were exceptions) were to join forces and equip a soldier. Those farms were the rote, and they also provided a croft (soldattorp), farmland, and equipment for one volunteer soldier who could then make a military career, while the rest of the men in the rote escaped conscription. The soldier's duty was to attend military drills, and in time of war was to report for duty, wherever that might be. Royal manors, farms owned by the nobility, and farms used as salary to government officials were exempted and did not need to provide soldiers to the system. While most regiments were allotted in the late 17th century—Dalarna Regiment and a few others were allotted earlier.

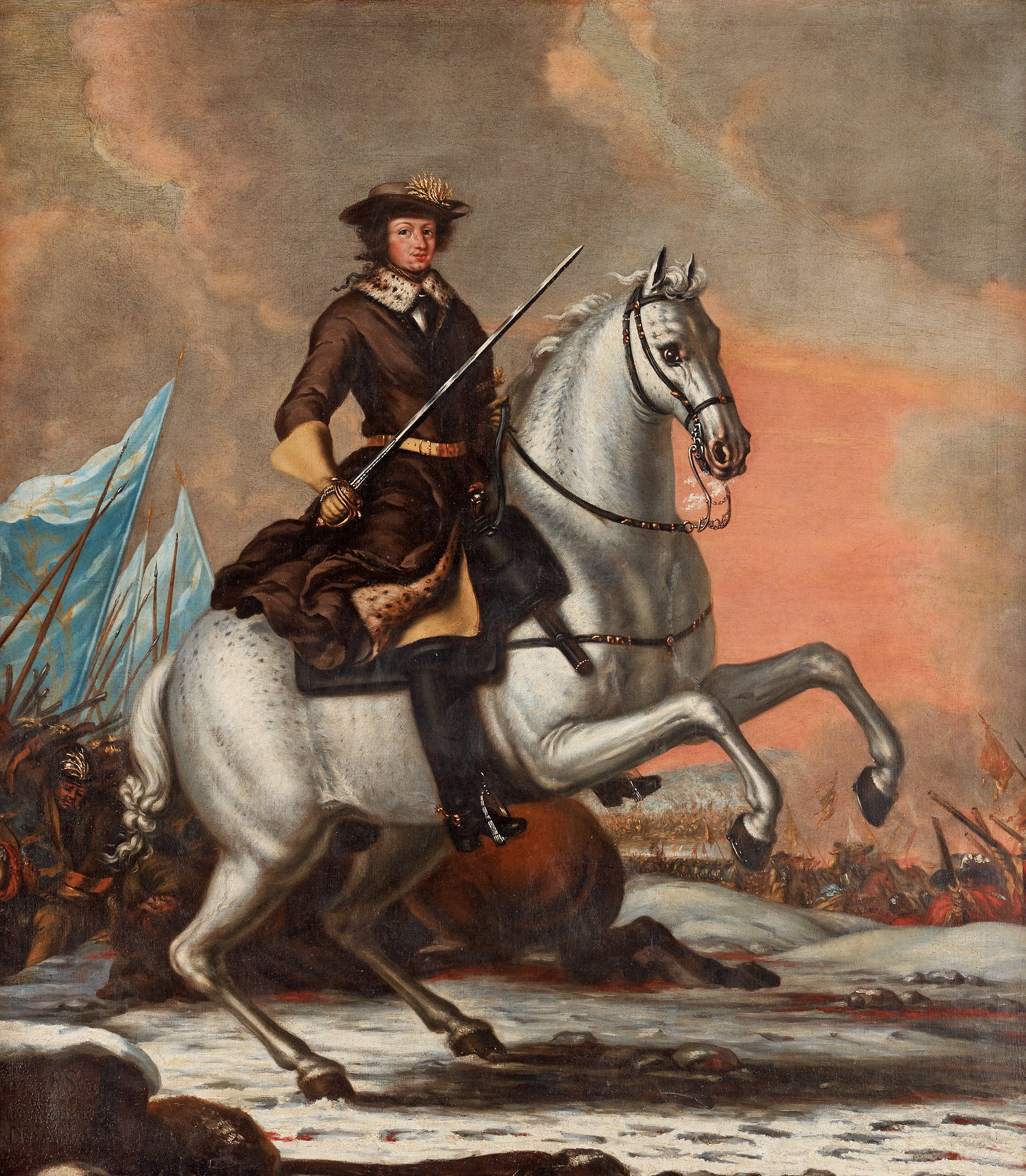
Charles XI introduced the new allotment system.

=== Horse ===
The cavalry was conscripted in the same way as in the old system, with each rusthåll providing a horse and horseman. In later years, contrary to the early times when the rider was often the farmer himself, the horseman was a volunteer in the same way as in the infantry, and he was also supplied with a croft (ryttartorp) and pay from the farmer, who in turn gained a large tax reduction and also did not need to serve in the army. This was mainly done because it was easier to replace a fallen horseman than replace the master of the estate. Usually, the rusthåll was made up of only one estate, and possibly another supporting farmer. In exceptional cases, one rusthåll could support as many as seven horsemen.

=== Enlisted regiments ===
The guards regiments, the garrison regiments, and the artillery recruited its soldiers through volunteer enlistment by the regiment itself. Many new regiments of enlisted mercenaries were also raised in wartime; for example, only one-fifth of soldiers in the Swedish army at the Battle of Breitenfeld in 1631 were of Swedish or Finnish origin. The rest of the army was made up of German, Scottish and other European mercenaries. This would however change during the Great Northern War, in which a majority of the regiment's soldiers were from Sweden (including Finland) or its dominions.

Allotment for the army was only applied to the countryside and not to the towns, where people were exclusively recruited to the navy. Each province had its own regiment consisting of 1,200 soldiers (and thus also 1,200 rotar, not counting officers) for an infantry regiment, or 1,000 horsemen (and 1,000 rusthåll) for a cavalry regiment. Thus, a rote did not necessarily consist of ten men fit for military service as in the old system; it could instead consist of a single wealthy estate or several small farms, all depending on the tax amount and the number of soldiers the farms or estates would be able to provide.

== Navy system ==
The Swedish Navy recruited their seamen using the same system as the army, but from coastal provinces and towns (including non-coastal towns). As with the infantry, the farms in coastal areas were organized into rotar, which would each provide a croft (båtmanstorp) for a navy volunteer. Recruits only had duties on board the ships, for example as artillerymen or sailors, and were not used for other combat duties, such as boardings and landings, which were executed by army units transported on the ships. The seamen often served in the navy six months over the summer of every third year. Later, from the middle of the 18th century, some of the rotar in the cities would pay a fee equal to the approximate cost of providing a boatsman, instead of providing one from among themselves.

There were several problems with this system, relating to the fact that a large proportion of the seamen did not live anywhere near the largest naval ports of Stockholm, Gothenburg, and Karlskrona. Many seamen had their crofts along the coast of Norrland and Finland, and thus had several hundred kilometres to travel when called into service. Originally, the seamen had to walk the long way to the nearest port; later, they were transported by horse and carriage. Even the latter method of transport, however, took a long time, and soon the state began to provide tools and materials, excepting the actual timber, to the rote so that the farmers could build a large rowing/sailing boat called a lodja. These boats could transport up to 25 men, and could ease the transport to the naval ports.

== Crofts and soldiers ==
Each rote in the new allotment system had the responsibility to recruit a soldier for the army, provide his croft with a patch of land, a cow, a few chickens and few pigs or sheep so he could support a family, pay him his salary, and supply him with necessities such as hay and seed. The rote also had to provide the soldier with the uniform. The croft and land, located on the land of the rote, only belonged to the soldier as long as he was fit for service. If he died or had to retire, the croft would have to be returned to the rote, even if it made his family homeless; the rote in turn had to find a new recruit. It sometimes happened that a widow of a dead soldier married the rote's new recruit, as the rote was regarded as responsible to take care also of the remaining family of its fallen serviceman. The soldier lived at his croft for large parts of his life, mostly working at the farms that supported his household, and went away to a few training camps a year, honing his tactics and skills with his regiment. When at war, the soldier could be away for years at a time, leaving all of the chores to his wife and children, if he had any. Otherwise, the rote farmers would take over the work themselves.

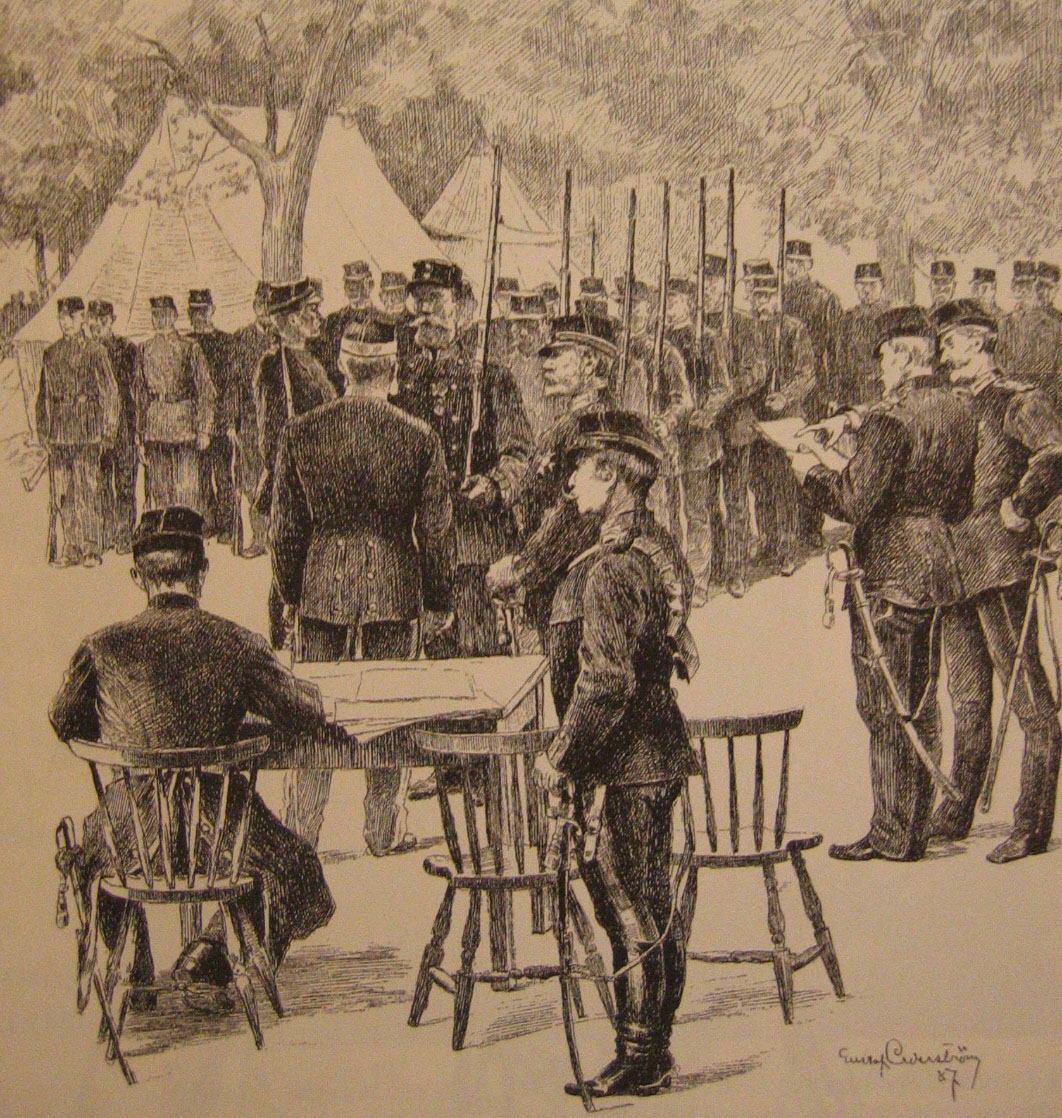
Swedish croft soldiers at a general muster, drawing by Gustaf Cederström, 1887.

Recruits in the early 18th century had to be physically and mentally fit, between 18 and 36 years old (18–30 years from 1819, 18–25 years from 1871) and at least 172 centimeters tall (175 cm from 1775, lowered to 167 cm from 1788 as the army was in dire need of soldiers during Gustav III's Russian War). Many soldiers served in the army for more than 30 years, as there was no service time stated in the contract; instead, being discharged required a reason, such as old age, injury, sickness, or the commission of a crime. Discharges were generally only given at general musters, held once a year, or even more sparsely, even though an interim discharge could be given by the regimental commander if the discharge was supported by the soldier. The interim discharge had to be confirmed at the next general muster.

From the 1680s (army) and early 18th century (navy), all soldiers in a given company were required to have a unique name, to make it easier to give specific orders. This could be problematic when several soldiers had the same name (being usually from rural background, they generally had just a patronymic, and such were often very common, e.g. Andersson, Eriksson, Olsson or Persson), giving rise to the Swedish soldier names. When a soldier appeared before the military scribe, he was given a soldier's name (often, a rote's new soldier received his predecessor's name), which he kept during his service. Those surnames also tended to become hereditary, as the soldier often retained it when he was pensioned or left the service, and his children were also registered under it in census lists and church books—this is the origin of many present-day Swedish surnames. The name was usually short, consisting of only one syllable—to make it easy and rapid to say. The names could be taken from a trait, such as the surname Stolt ("Proud") or from military terms, such as Svärd ("Sword"), but were often related to the rote. A soldier from a rote located in the village of Sundby, for example, could be given the surname Sundin. This meant that surnames often stayed with the croft, rather than with the soldier. Common practice amongst discharged soldiers in the 18th century was to reassume their original name. This changed in the 19th century, and many soldiers kept their old soldier names, passing it on to their children. Each soldier in the regiment also had a unique number, between 1 and 1,200, the number of the rote and croft he belonged to (for example nummer 15 Stolt, number 15 Stolt).

== Officers ==
Officers were provided with a large farm or a small manor house directly from the Crown, not from a rote. They did not, however, receive a salary from the state, but were instead paid by the rotar around the province, as part of the rote members' tax payments, and by farmers who worked the land belonging to the officer's farm. The officers' homes were loans, rather than outright gifts, and their size and quality was proportionate to the occupants' military rank. It was this system that was originally called the "allotment system". A condition for the system to work was the reductions carried through by the state, expropriating land and farms from the nobles, which were then provided to the officers. The officers' homesteads would be located in the same part of the province as the soldiers whom the officer would command in battle, often close to the rote. The officer thus knew the men he would lead, contrary to the practice in many other countries where the army officers would live on estates that were separated from the soldiers by both distance and lifestyle.

== Military impact ==
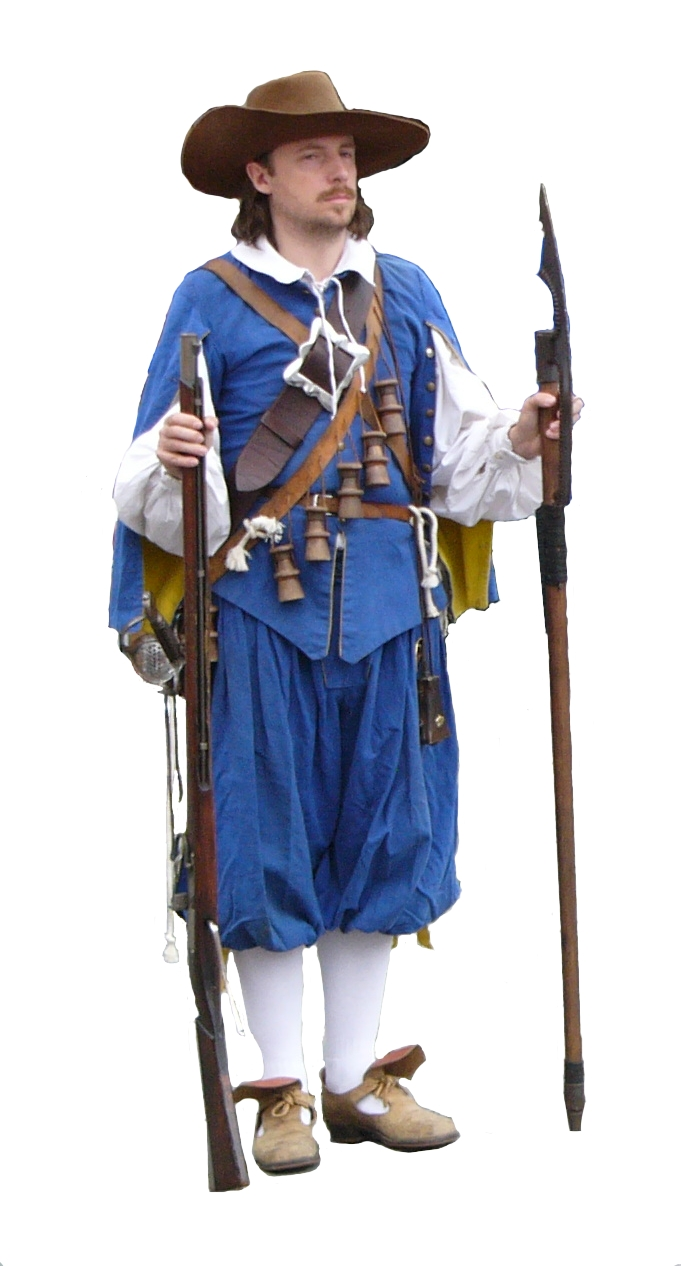
Reenactment: Musketeer of the Altblau regiment (1624–1650) with musket and bardiche

The Swedish military had a unique position in Northern Europe at the time of the new system, being the only army that did not rely only on enlisted soldiers, mercenaries or conscripted soldiers. In relation to population size, the Swedish army was also the largest in Europe. Because of the allotment system, mobilisation was quick. It took time, weeks and months, to enlist, equip, train and organize a unit of mercenaries, while the Swedish croft soldiers gathered at the company meeting place in a couple of days, and then at the regimental meeting place in around a week. The soldiers were already trained and equipped, and knew their precise spot in the formation. Marching routes to the borders or to harbours had already been prepared, and supplies had been gathered at important places.

Swedish battle tactics relied on a high level of organisation and the large-scale use of swords and pikes. Other armies had stopped using pikemen in the late 17th century, solely relying on the bayonet of the musketeer to protect against cavalry attacks. Reasons for the Swedish obstinacy in keeping the pikes and making large use of swords in battle include the Swedish loss in the Battle of Kircholm in 1605, where a modernised Swedish army was severely beaten by Polish hussars—partly due to being equipped with the latest muskets which were hard to handle—and the fact that pikemen were very expensive to hire to armies that were formed by mercenaries; however, as Sweden had the allotment system and thus did not pay a higher salary to pikemen, they were kept.

The high level of organisation and morale made it possible to base the combat tactics on close combat, rather than long-range shooting. A regular attack would look like the following: When the enemy musketeers started firing, at ranges up to 100 metres, the Swedish infantry would not answer but keep a swift marching pace, not stopping until the range was as little as 40 metres, where the musketeers in the back of the formation would fire their only salvo. At an even closer range, the musketeers in the front would fire their only salvo, and immediately after that, break into the enemy lines—musketeers using their swords, and pikemen using their pikes. This tactic would often result in a fleeing enemy force, which probably stood terrified when their opponent's companies were not stopped by continuous musket fire, but kept marching on towards them in sinister silence.

== Civil impact ==
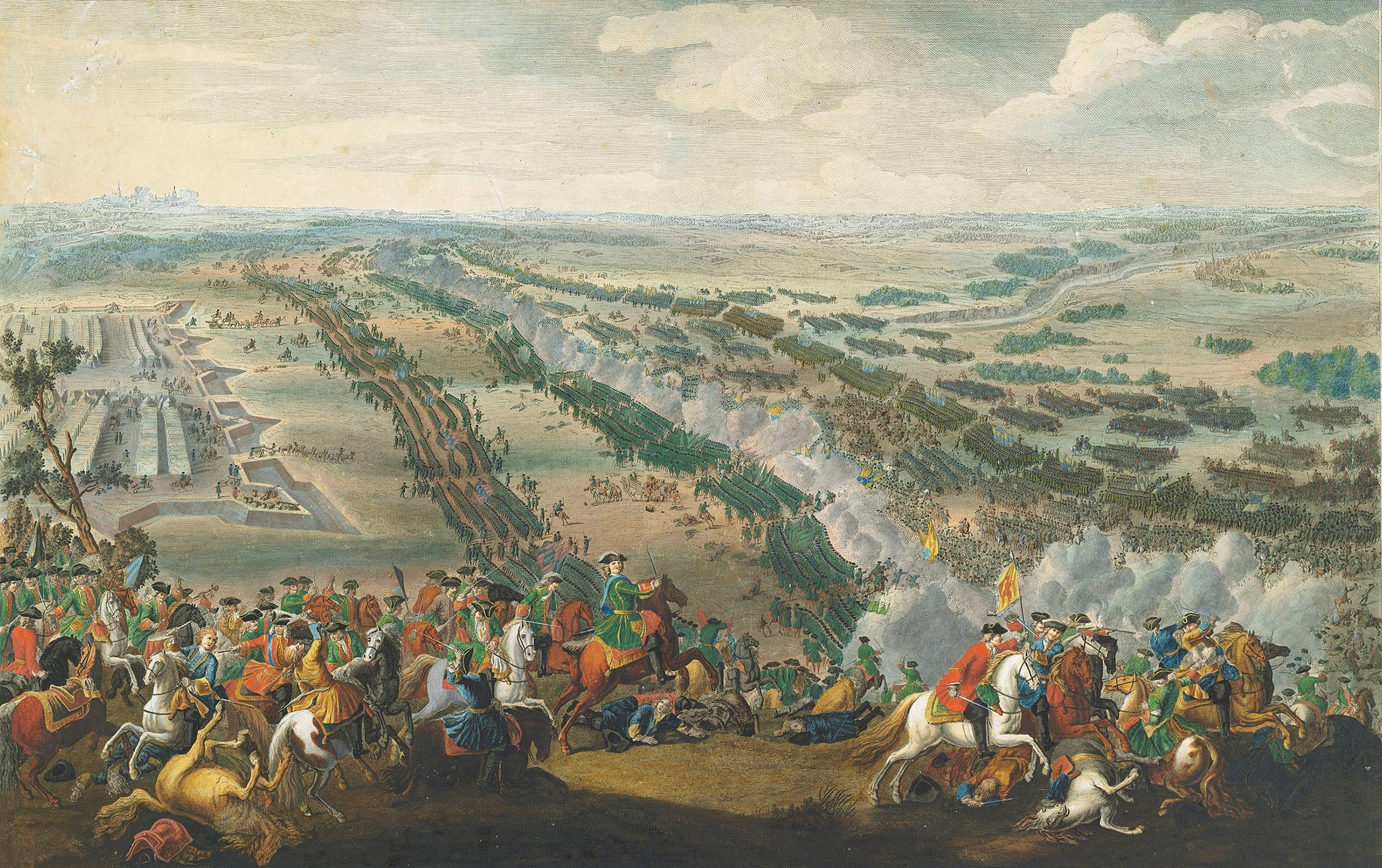
The Battle of Poltava (1709), drawing by Pierre-Denis Martin, 1726

During the time of the old allotment system, Sweden's involvement in the Thirty Years' War and the Northern Wars did not have a very large impact on the population in general. The armies of Sweden under Gustavus Adolphus and later Charles X Gustav had relatively large success due to the superior tactics used, and foreign mercenaries comprised large parts of the armies. Gustavus Adolphus had, when he entered the Thirty Years' War, an army of 14,500 Swedish and Finnish conscripts and more than 20,000 enlisted foreigners, and deaths in the latter group did not affect the Swedish population. Charles XI's new allotment system did not have to see use in the first 20 years of its existence, which was also the longest time of peace Sweden had seen since its independence. Thus, the population continued to grow at a steady rate between 1620 and 1700.

The new system was put to the test for the first time in 1700, when Sweden, under the reign of Charles XII, was attacked by a coalition of its neighbours Russia, Denmark-Norway and Saxony-Poland in the Great Northern War. The mobilisation of the soldiers worked well thanks to the new system, with Sweden mobilising 43,000 men in allotted regiments, and another 33,000 men from various enlisted regiments. The army was one of the largest in Europe at the time, having modern equipment and being very well-trained and organised. However, three enemies were too much, even though Charles XII forced Denmark to leave the war the same year it started, and forced Saxony to leave the war in 1706. After these successful blows to the coalition, Charles XII had the opportunity to sign a peace with the remaining opponent, Russia. He did not, and this decision would have immense effects on the population. Russia's vast plains did not give Charles XII the possibility to beat his enemy with his superior army; instead, he was forced into a war of attrition, a war he could not win.

Swedish Caroleans musketeers in both front and back fire a salvo while the pikemen protect against an enemy cavalry attack.

As the war finally ended in 1721, Sweden had lost an estimated 200,000 men, 150,000 of those from present-day Sweden and 50,000 from the Finnish part of Sweden. This made a huge impact on a population that before the war had barely reached 2 million. The total population did not grow during the 21 years of the war; it was even reduced, according to some sources, as the massive losses outnumbered overall births. For example, the province of Östergötland was supposed to support 2,200 croft soldiers, making up one infantry and one cavalry regiment. Losses had to be replaced, and during the first years of the war, another 2,400 men were conscripted. After the Battle of Poltava in 1709, both regiments had to be completely reraised. At the end of the war, a total of 10,400 soldiers had been conscripted from the province that was meant to support only a fifth, or 2,200. Another regiment, Hälsinge Regiment, had to be completely raised three times during the war. The lack of soldiers became so critical that in the period 1714–1715, the army had to return to the old method of conscripting men by force.

== Conscription ==
In 1812, a new system was introduced, requiring all males between age 20 and 25 to serve in the armed forces twelve days a year, changing in 1858 to four weeks per two years. At the same time, the new allotment system remained in use up until 1901, when mandatory conscription, with 8–9 months of military service, was introduced. The allotment system was finally abolished in 1901. From that time, regiments began to be garrisoned in towns instead of being spread all over the province with a training ground as the only common meeting place. As croft soldiers were contracted by the government for as long as they wanted and were fit for service, and as they could not be dismissed, some soldiers lived under the allotment system long after 1901, the last one retiring as late as 1961. Through the reform, the regiments' local connections were partially lost, as conscripts were not necessarily from the regiments' respective provinces. Before the reform, soldiers of the same company generally stemmed from the same village and region.

== See also ==
- Caroleans
- History of Sweden
- Knight's fee
- List of Swedish regiments
- List of Swedish wars
- Military of the Grand Duchy of Finland
- Theme (Byzantine district)
- Tuntian
