= Polish–Swedish War (1600–1629) =

Period of European wars

The Polish–Swedish War (1600–1629) was thrice interrupted by periods of truce and thus can be divided into:

- Polish–Swedish War (1600–1611)
- Polish–Swedish War (1617–1618)
- Polish–Swedish War (1621–1625)
- Polish–Swedish War (1626–1629)
