= Life company =

First company of a Swedish Army regiment

A Life Company (Swedish: Livkompani, but usually written in its definite form; Livkompaniet) is a Swedish military term of several centuries' standing. It is the first company of a regiment in the Swedish Army. Before the 17th century, the term referred to the company that was controlled directly by the regimental commander.

The Life Guards regiment consists, in part, of a life company. The 130-man company's official name is Livkompaniet and is tasked with ceremonial and guard duties at the Swedish royal residences. Additionally, men from the company staff the IBSS unit of the Life Guards, which defends the Cavalry Barracks (Kavallerikasern).
