= Fähnlein =

Medieval European military unit

The Fähnlein (in Swedish: fänika) was an infantry unit approximately equivalent to the company or battalion which was used in parts of Europe during the Middle Ages. The size of the unit varied; originally a Fähnlein could consist of as many as 1,000 soldiers, but numbers were generally less, around 500. It was sub-divided into sections or Rotten (singular: Rotte) of between 6 and 12 men.

== Origin and usage ==
The Fähnlein, meaning "small banner", consisted of small number of soldiers that were organized under a single banner, hence the unit's name. Rotte comes from the Middle Latin word rupta which means "dispersed troop". The word "company", which was used throughout Europe, superseded Fähnlein in the 17th century, even in German-speaking regions. It was later used by the scouts and Wandervögel as well as by the Deutsches Jungvolk during the Nazi era. Rotte was later also used in the organisational structure of the SS and has survived into the Bundeswehr.

== History ==
By the Middle Ages, the Fähnlein was already the administrative unit with military forces, especially in the infantry. It initially had 400 to 600 men, sometimes up to 1,000. In France it usually consisted of 300 men. Georg von Frundsberg had 380 Landsknechte. However, these numbers were target strengths, which were almost never attained. Thus, the actual strength of the French Fähnlein for a long time was no more than 100 to 200 men.

The regiments of different armies had very different numbers of Fähnlein:

- 18 Fähnlein at Frundsberg
- 12 Fähnlein in a French Legion
- 10 Fähnlein in the Imperial Troops during the Schmalkaldic War

The Fähnlein consisted of a mix of archers, pikemen and halberdiers.

In the 17th century, some Fähnleins or fänikor would have a strength of only 100 to 200 men, and it was at this time that the designation "company" came into widespread use.

=== Germany ===
In Germany, a Fähnlein was the subordinate formation within a Landsknecht regiment. Each Fähnlein consisted of several Rotten (singular: Rotte). As a formed unit, a Fähnlein consisted of around 400 Landsknechte, commanded by a captain (Feldhauptmann, Hauptmann or Kapitän).

A Rotte consisted of eight to twelve Landsknechte or six Doppelsöldner and was led by a Rottmeister. It equates roughly to the modern section or fireteam. At the beginning of the 17th century, i.e. before the Thirty Years' War a Fähnlein in Germany was supposed to have the following strength:

- 100 pikemen
- 160 musketeers
- 20 halberdiers
- 20 swordsmen (Rundtartschiere)

Under Charles V the staff of a German Fähnlein was as follows:

- 1 captain (Hauptmann)
- 1 lieutenant (Leutnant, Lieutenant, Locotenens or Leutinger)
- 1 ensign (Fähnrich)
- 1 sergeant (Feldwebel)
- 1 chaplain (Kaplan)
- 1 quartermaster sergeant (Fourier)
- 1 guide (Führer)
- 2 Gemeinwebel
- 1 or 2 Drummers (Trommler) or fifers (Pfeifer)
- 2 so-called trabants to guard the captain
- 1 translator (Dolmetscher)
- 2 runners (Jungen) for the captain and the ensign
- 1 cook (Koch)
- 1 mounted rider (Knecht) for the captain

This structure was also called the prima plana (Latin for "first sheet") because these appointments were on the first page of the muster lists.

=== Sweden ===
Roughly the same organization was used in Sweden, where each province raised a number of fänikor, which were organized into a provincial regiment. Many of the regiments of the Swedish Army of today trace their origins back to the fänikor of the 16th century. The fänika was led by a Hövitsman, the equivalent of a Captain. The corresponding cavalry unit was called ryttarfana (rider banner).

== Ensigns ==
The military rank of Fähnrich (Germany) or Fänrik (Sweden) was held by the ensigns or low ranking officer who carried the banner (German Fahne, Swedish Fana) of the Fähnlein or fänika. The Spanish army has a similar formation called a Bandera (flag, banner).

== See also ==
- Heerhaufen
