= List of Swedish infantry regiments =

This is a list of Swedish infantry regiments.

== Original regiments ==
The original thirteen (fourteen) Swedish county regiments of Foot:

- Dalregementet (Dalarna Regiment)
- Hälsinge regemente (Hälsingland Regiment)
- Jönköpings regemente (Jönköping Regiment)
- Kalmar regemente (Kalmar Regiment)
- Kronobergs regemente (Kronoberg Regiment)
- Närke-Värmlands regemente (Närke-Värmland Regiment)
- Skaraborgs regemente (Skaraborg Regiment)
- Södermanlands regemente (Södermanland Regiment)
- Upplands regemente (Uppland Regiment)
- Västerbottens regemente (Västerbotten Regiment)
- Västgöta-Dals regemente (Västergötland-Dalsland Regiment)
- Västmanlands regemente (Västmanland Regiment)
- Älvsborgs regemente (Älvsborg Regiment)
- Östgöta infanteriregemente (Östergötland Infantry Regiment)

The original seven Finnish provincial infantry regiments:

- Björneborgs läns regemente (Björneborg County Regiment)
- Nylands infanteriregemente (Nyland Regiment of Foot)
- Savolax och Nyslotts läns regemente (Savolax and Nyslott County Regiment)
- Tavastehus läns regemente (Tavastehus County Regiment)
- Viborgs läns infanteriregemente (Viborg County Regiment of Foot)
- Åbo läns infanteriregemente (Åbo County Regiment of Foot)
- Österbottens regemente (Österbotten Regiment)

Later raised Swedish infantry regiments:

- Andra livgrenadjärregementet (2nd Life Grenadier Regiment)
- Bergsregementet (The Mine Regiment)
- Blekinge bataljon (Blekinge Battalion)
- Drottningens livregemente till fot (Queen's Life Regiment of Foot)
- Första livgrenadjärregementet (1st Life Grenadier Regiment)
- Gotlands infanteriregemente (Gotland Infantry Regiment)
- Göta livgarde (Göta Life Guards)
- Jämtlands fältjägarregemente (Jämtland Ranger Regiment)
- Karlskrona grenadjärregemente (Karlskrona Grenadier Regiment)
- Lapplands jägarregemente (Lapland Rifle Regiment)
- Livdrabantkåren (The Gardes du Corps)
- Livgrenadjärregementet (Life Grenadier Regiment)
- Livregementet till fot (Life Regiment of Foot)
- Norra skånska infanteriregementet (North Scanian Infantry Regiment)
- Norra Smålands regemente (Northern Småland Regiment)
- Norrbottens regemente (Norrbotten Regiment)
- Närkes regemente (Närke Regiment)
- Svea livgarde (Svea Life Guards)
- Svenska livregementet till fot (Swedish Life Regiment of Foot)
- Södra skånska infanteriregementet (Southern Scanian Infantry Regiment)
- Vaxholms grenadjärregemente (Vaxholm Grenadier Regiment)
- Värmlands regemente (Värmland Regiment)
- Västernorrlands regemente (Västernorrland Regiment)

Later raised Finnish infantry regiments:

- Finska värvade bataljonen (Finnish Enlisted Battalion)
- Nylands och Tavastehus västra infanteriregemente (Nyland and Tavastia West Infantry Regiment)
- Savolax jägarregemente (Savonia Ranger Regiment)
- Vasa regemente (Vasa Regiment)
- Östra Nylands infanteriregemente (East Nyland Infantry Regiment)

Later raised German infantry regiments:

- Anklamska lantregementet (Anklam County Regiment)
- Bajerska infanteriregementet (Bavarian Infantry Regiment)
- Bremiska infanteriregementet (Bremen Infantry Regiment)
- Bremiska lantregementet (Bremen County Regiment)
- Elbingska garnisonsregementet (Elbing Garrison Regiment)
- Garnisonsregementet i Stade (Garrison Regiment in Stade)
- Garnisonsregementet i Stralsund (Garrison Regiment in Stralsund)
- Garnisonsregementet i Wismar (Garrison Regiment in Wismar)
- Guvernörsregementet i Wismar (Governor's Regiment in Wismar)
- Lantregementet i Stettin (County Regiment in Stettin)
- Pommerska infanteriregementet (Pomeranian Infantry Regiment)
- Rhenländska infanteriregementet (Rhineland Infantry Regiment)
- Riksänkedrottningens livregemente i Pommern (Queen Dowager's Life Guard Regiment in Pomerania)
- Rügenska lantregementet (Rügian County Regiment)
- Sachsiska infanteriregementet (Saxon Infantry Regiment)
- Sachsisk infanteribataljon I (Saxon Infantry Battalion I)
- Sachsisk infanteribataljon II (Saxon Infantry Battalion II)
- Sachsisk infanteribataljon III (Saxon Infantry Battalion III)
- Tyska livregementet till fot (German Foot Life Guard Regiment
- Tysk infanteribataljon (German Infantry Battalion))

Later raised Baltic infantry regiments:

- Estländskt infanteriregemente, Harriska kretsen (Estonian Infantry Regiment, Harrian Circle)
- Estländskt infanteriregemente, Jerwiska kretsen (Estonian Infantry Regiment, Jerwian Circle)
- Estländskt infanteriregemente, Wieriska kretsen I (Estonian Infantry Regiment, Wierian Circle I)
- Estländskt infanteriregemente, Wieriska kretsen II (Estonian Infantry Regiment, Wierian Circle II)
- Estländskt infanteriregemente II (Estonian Infantry Regiment II)
- Garnisonsregementet i Narva (Garrison Regiment in Narva)
- Garnisonsregementet i Riga (Garrison Regiment in Riga)
- Guvenörsregementet i Riga (Governor's Regiment in Riga)
- Ingermanländskt infanteriregemente (Ingrian Infantry Regiment)
- Livländsk infanteribataljon I (Livonian Infantry Battalion I)
- Livländsk infanteribataljon II (Livonian Infantry Battalion II)
- Livländsk infanteribataljon III (Livonian Infantry Battalion III)
- Livländsk infanteribataljon IV (Livonian Infantry Battalion IV)
- Livländskt infanteriregemente I (Livonian Infantry Regiment I)
- Livländskt infanteriregemente II (Livonian Infantry Regiment II)
- Livländskt infanteriregemente III (Livonian Infantry Regiment III)
- Livländskt infanteriregemente IV (Livonian Infantry Regiment IV)
- Livländskt infanteriregemente V (Livonian Infantry Regiment V)
- Stadsmajorens i Reval Bataljon (Reval City Major Battalion)

Other later raised infantry regiments:

- Värvat främlingsregemente (Enlisted Foreigner Regiment)
- Fransk bataljon (French Battalion)
- Schweizisk bataljon (Swiss Battalion)

Later raised Swedish temporary infantry regiments:

- Grenadjärbataljonen (Grenadier Battalion)
- Hallands utskrivningsregemente (Halland Conscript Regiment)
- Hälsinge tremänningsbataljon (Hälsingland Third Man Battalion)
- Närke-Värmlands tremänningsregemente till fot (Närke-Värmland Third Man Foot Regiment)
- Smålands femmänningsregemente till fot (Småland Fifth Man Foot Regiment)
- Smålands tremänningsregemente till fot (Småland Third Man Foot Regiment)
- Upplands femmänningsregemente (Uppland Fifth Man Regiment)
- Upplands tremänningsregemente till fot (Uppland Third Man Foot Regiment)
- Västerbottens tremänningar till fot (Västerbotten Foot Third Men)
- Västgöta femmänningsregemente till fot (Västergötland Fifth Man Foot Regiment)
- Västgöta tremänningsregemente till fot (Västergötland Third Man Foot Regiment)
- Västra skånska utskrivningsregementet (Western Scanian Conscript Regiment)
- Östgöta och Södermanlands tremänningsregemente till fot (Östergötland and Södermanland Third Man Foot Regiment)
- Östra skånska utskrivningsregementet (Eastern Scanian Conscript Regiment)

Later raised Finnish temporary infantry regiments:

- Åbo, Björneborgs och Nylands tremänningsregemente till fot (Åbo, Björneborg and Nyland Third Man Foot Regiment)
- Nylands femmänningar till fot (Nyland Foot Fifth Men)
- Österbottens femmänningar till fot (Österbotten Foot Fifth Men)
- Österbottens tremänningar till fot (Österbotten Foot Third Men)
- Savolax femmänningsregemente till fot (Savonia Fifth Man Foot Regiment)
- Tavastehus, Viborgs och Nyslotts läns tremänningsregemente till fot (Tavastia, Viborg and Nyslott County Third Man Foot Regiment)

== By unit ==
- I 1 - Svea livgarde (1521–1808, 1809–2000)
- LG - Livgardet (2000– )
- I 2 - Göta livgarde (1894–1939)
- I 2 - Värmlands regemente (1939–2000)
- I 3 - Livregementet till fot (1893–1904)
- I 3 - Livregementets grenadjärer (1904–2000)
- I 4 - Första livgrenadjärregementet (1816–1927)
- I 4 - Livgrenadjärregementet (1928–1998)
- I 5 - Andra livgrenadjärregementet (1816–1927)
- I 5 - Jämtlands fältjägarregemente (1820–1853, 1892–2005)
- I 6 - Västgöta regemente (1811–1927)
- I 6 - Norra skånska infanteriregementet (1811–1963)
- I 7 - Karlskrona grenadjärregemente (1902–1927)
- I 7 - Södra skånska infanteriregementet (1811–1963)
- I 9 - Skaraborgs regemente (1624–1942)
- I 10 - Södermanlands regemente (1634–1942, 1957–1963)
- I 11 - Kronobergs regemente (1623–1997)
- I 12 - Jönköpings regemente (1623–1927)
- I 12 - Jönköpings-Kalmar regemente (1928–1948)
- I 12 - Norra Smålands regemente (1948–1994)
- I 12 - Smålands regemente (1994–2000)
- I 13 - Dalregementet (1617–2000, 2021–)
- I 14 - Hälsinge regemente (1617–1993(1997*))
- I 15 - Älvsborgs regemente (1624–1998)
- I 16 - Västgöta-Dals regemente (1624–1902)
- I 16 - Hallands regemente (1902–2000)
- I 17 - Bohusläns regemente (1661–1992)
- I 18 - Västmanlands regemente (1628–1927)
- I 18 - Gotlands infanterikår (1928–1936)
- I 18 - Gotlands infanteriregemente (1936–1963)
- I 19 - Norrbottens regemente (1892–1975, 1994– )
- I 20 - Kalmar regemente (1623–1892)
- I 20 - Västerbottens regemente (1624–2000)
- I 21 - Kalmar regemente (1892–1927)
- I 21 - Närkes regemente (1812–1893)
- I 21 - Västernorrlands regemente (1928–2000)
- I 22 - Värmlands regemente (1812–1939)
- I 22 - Lapplands jägarregemente (1945–2000)
- I 23 - Jämtlands fältjägarregemente (1820–1853, 1892–1927)
- I 24 - Norra skånska infanteriregementet (1811–1928)
- I 25 - Södra skånska infanteriregementet (1811–1928)
- I 26 - Vaxholms grenadjärregemente (1902–1928)
- I 27 - Gotlands infanteriregemente (1887–1927)
- I 28 - Västernorrlands regemente (1902–1927)
- I 29 - Västernorrlands regemente (1893–1902)
- I 30 - Blekinge bataljon (1886–1902)
- I 34 - Södra skånska infanteriregementet (1811–1928)

== By name ==
- Adlerkreutz regemente
- af Paléns värvade regemente
- Andra gardesregementet
- Andra livgardet
- Andra livgrenadjärregementet - I 5
- Arméns jägarskola - JS
- Blekinge bataljon - I 30
- Bohusläns regemente - I 17
- Dalregementet - I 13
- Finska gardesregementet
- Fleetwoodska regementet
- Första livgrenadjärregementet - I 4
- Garnisonsregementet i Göteborg
- Gotlands infanterikår - I 18
- Gotlands infanteriregemente - I 27
- Gotlands nationalbeväring
- Gotlands regemente - I 18
- Göta livgarde - I 2
- Hallands bataljon - I 28
- Hallands regemente - I 16
- Hälsinge regemente - I 14
- Jägerhornska regementet
- Jämtlands dragonregemente
- Jämtlands fältjägarkår
- Jämtlands fältjägarregemente - I 23, I 5
- Jämtlands infanteriregemente
- Jämtlands regemente till fot
- Jönköpings regemente - I 12
- Jönköpings-Kalmar regemente - I 12
- Kalmar regemente - I 20, I 21
- Karlskrona grenadjärregemente - I 7
- Kronobergs regemente - I 11
- Lapplands jägarregemente - I 22
- Livgardet - LG
- Livgrenadjärregementet - I 4
- Livregementet till fot - I 3
- Livregementets grenadjärer - I 3
- Livregementets grenadjärkår
- Livregementets grenadjärer - I 3
- Norra Smålands regemente - I 12
- Norra skånska infanteriregementet - I 24, I 6
- Norrbottens fältjägarkår
- Norrbottens regemente - I 19
- Närke regemente - I 21
- Närke-Värmlands regemente
- Skaraborgs regemente - I 9
- Smålands dragonregementes infanteribataljon
- Smålands grenadjärkår - I 7
- Smålands regemente - I 12
- Svea livgarde - I 1
- Svenska gardesregementet
- Södermanlands regemente - I 10
- Södra skånska infanteriregementet - I 34, I 25, I 7
- Upplands regemente - I 8
- Vaxholms grenadjärregemente - I 26
- Värmlands fotjägarbataljon
- Värmlands fältjägarkår - I 26
- Värmlands fältjägarregemente
- Värmlands regemente - I 22, I 2
- Västerbottens fältjägarkår
- Västerbottens fältjägarregemente
- Västerbottens regemente - I 19, I 20
- Västernorrlands bataljon
- Västernorrlands beväringsbataljon
- Västernorrlands regemente - I 29, I 28, I 21
- Västgöta regemente - I 6
- Västgöta-Dals regemente - I 16
- Västmanlands regemente - I 18
- Ångermanlands, Medelpads och Jämtlands regemente
- Älvsborgs regemente - I 15
- Änkedrottningens livregemente
- Östgöta infanteriregemente
