= Karlskrona Grenadier Regiment =

- Karlskrona grenadjärregemente
- Active: 1902–1927
- Country: Sweden
- Allegiance: Swedish Armed Forces
- Branch: Swedish Army
- Type: Infantry
- Size: Regiment
- Part of: I Army Division
- Garrison/HQ: Karlskrona
- Colors: Red and yellow
- March: "Finska rytteriets marsch" (unknown) (Note: The march was adopted in 1912, and was played in parallel with "Erzherzog Albrecht (Komzak).)
- Battle honours: Breitenfeld (1631, Lützen (1632), Kliszów (1702), Warschau (1705), Holowczyn (1708)

The Karlskrona Grenadier Regiment (Swedish: Karlskrona grenadjärregemente), designation I 7, was a Swedish Army infantry regiment that operated from 1902 to 1927. The regiment was based in Gräsvik in Karlskrona.

== History ==
By the 1901 Defense Reform, the regiment was raised on 1 January 1902, by a merger of the Småland Grenadier Corps and Blekinge Battalion. The regiment was responsible for the infantry in Karlskrona Fortress. The regiment was assigned the designation № 7, which was a designation that Småland Grenadier Corps assumed. From 1914, all order numbers within the army were adjusted. For the Karlskrona Grenadier Regiment, this meant that the regiment was assigned the designation I 7. The adjustment of the designation was made to distinguish the regiments between the various military branches, but also from their possible reserve and duplication regiments.

Through the Defence Act of 1925, the regiment was disbanded as an independent unit, and was reduced on 1 January 1928 to a detachment of the Kronoberg Regiment (I 11). The detachment consisted of Kronoberg Regiment's 3rd Battalion, named Kronoberg Regiment's Fortress Battalion in Karlskrona. Through the Defence Act of 1936, the detachment and the battalion was disbanded 30 September 1939.

== Barracks and training areas ==
=== Barracks ===
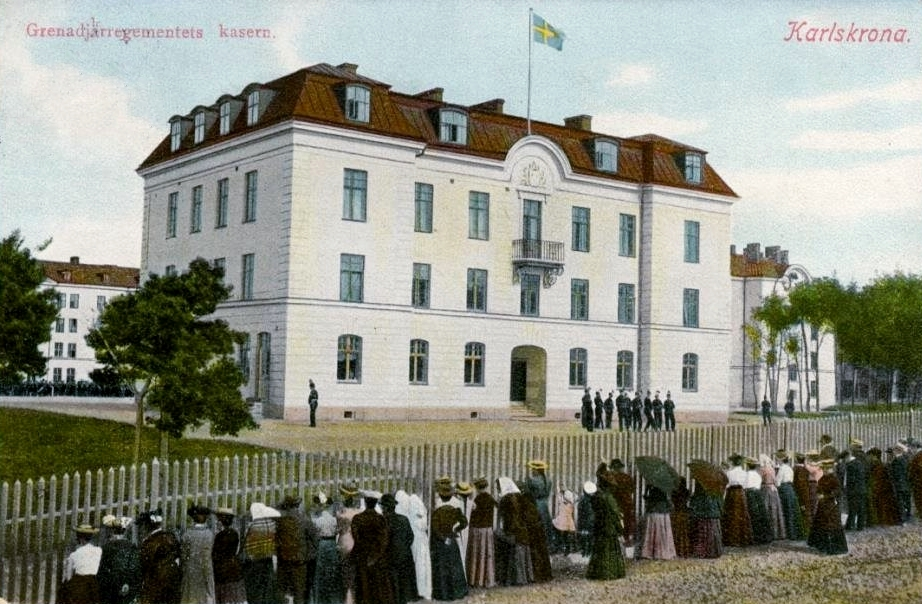
Chancellery building of the Karlskrona Grenadier Regiment (1909).

When the unit was raised in 1902 it would be placed to newly built barracks area at Gräsvik in northern Karlskrona. The barracks area, however, was not ready for occupation until 20 September 1906. The barracks establishment was constructed according to the 1901 Army Building Plan after the Fortifikationen's ("Royal Engineers") design for the infantry. A total of some 50 buildings were built, of which two buildings were moved to Gräsvik from Skillingaryd. After the regiment was disbanded in 1927, the barracks were used by the detached battalion of Kronoberg Regiment. After the battalion was disbanded in September 1939, the barracks came to host units of the Landstorm before they were taken over by Karlskrona Coastal Artillery Regiment (KA 2). In 1981, the barracks were abandoned, and were sold in 1984 to Karlskrona Municipality. Since 1989, the barracks area is the main campus for Blekinge Institute of Technology.

=== Training areas ===
When the regiment was raised in 1902, it took over the training areas at Bredåkra Heath outside Ronneby. After the regiment moved into barracks in 1906, Bredåkra Heath came until 1916 to remain as a training area. From 1916 until the regiment was disbanded in 1927, the regiment trained at Rosenholm, which was also the training area for the battalion from 1928 to 1939.

== Heraldry and traditions ==
=== Colours, standards and guidons ===
When the regiment was raised on 1 January 1902, the regiment stood without both a colour and heraldic arms. In 1905, it was decided that the regiment would take over the colour of the Småland Grenadier Corps which was handed over to the regiment on 16 June 1905. Alongside his colour there were also two colours that the regiment took over from the previously disbanded Marine Regiment. These two colours had the battle honours Hogland (1788) and Svensksund (1789).

After the regiment was disbanded on 31 December 1927, the colour was taken over by the Kronoberg Regiment's Fortress Battalion in Karlskrona. Following the disbandment of the battalion on 30 September 1939, the traditions of the regiment and the colour were passed on to the Kronoberg Regiment (I 11). The traditions of the regiment were continued until 1997 by Kronoberg Regiment (I 11).

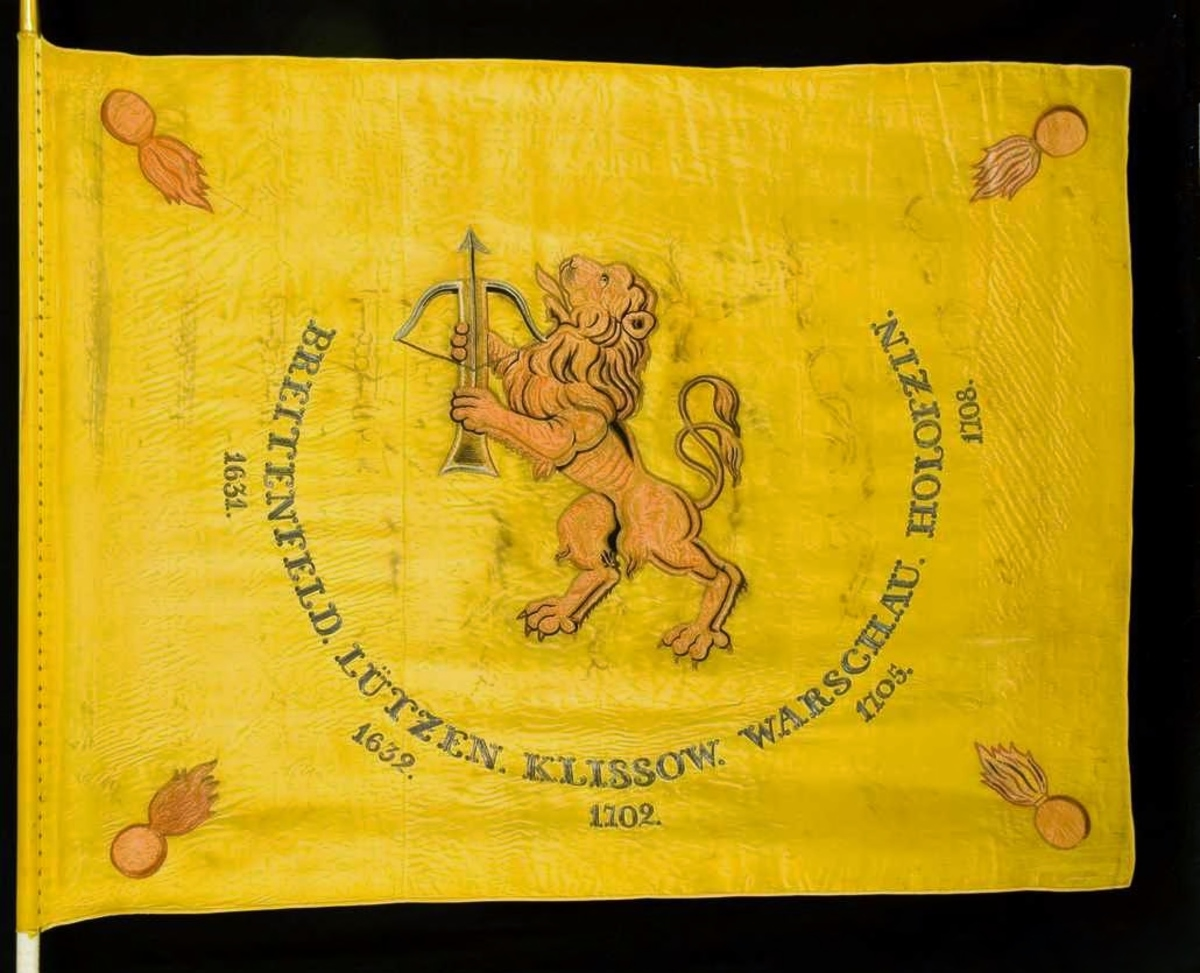
Colour m/1844 of the Småland Grenadier Corps and from 1905 of the Karlskrona Grenadier Regiment.

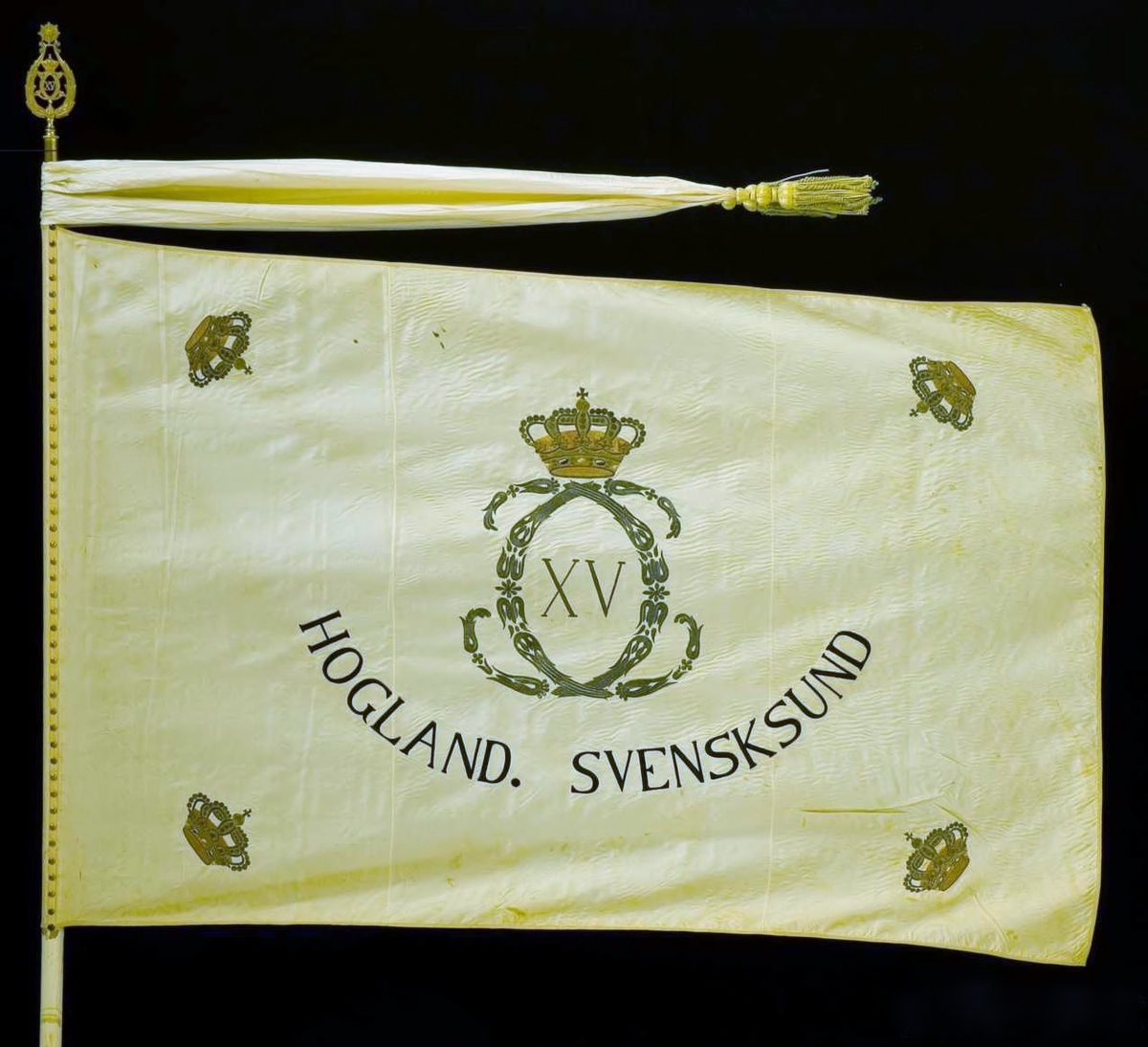
Colour m/1867 of the Marine Regiment and later of the Karlskrona Grenadier Regiment.

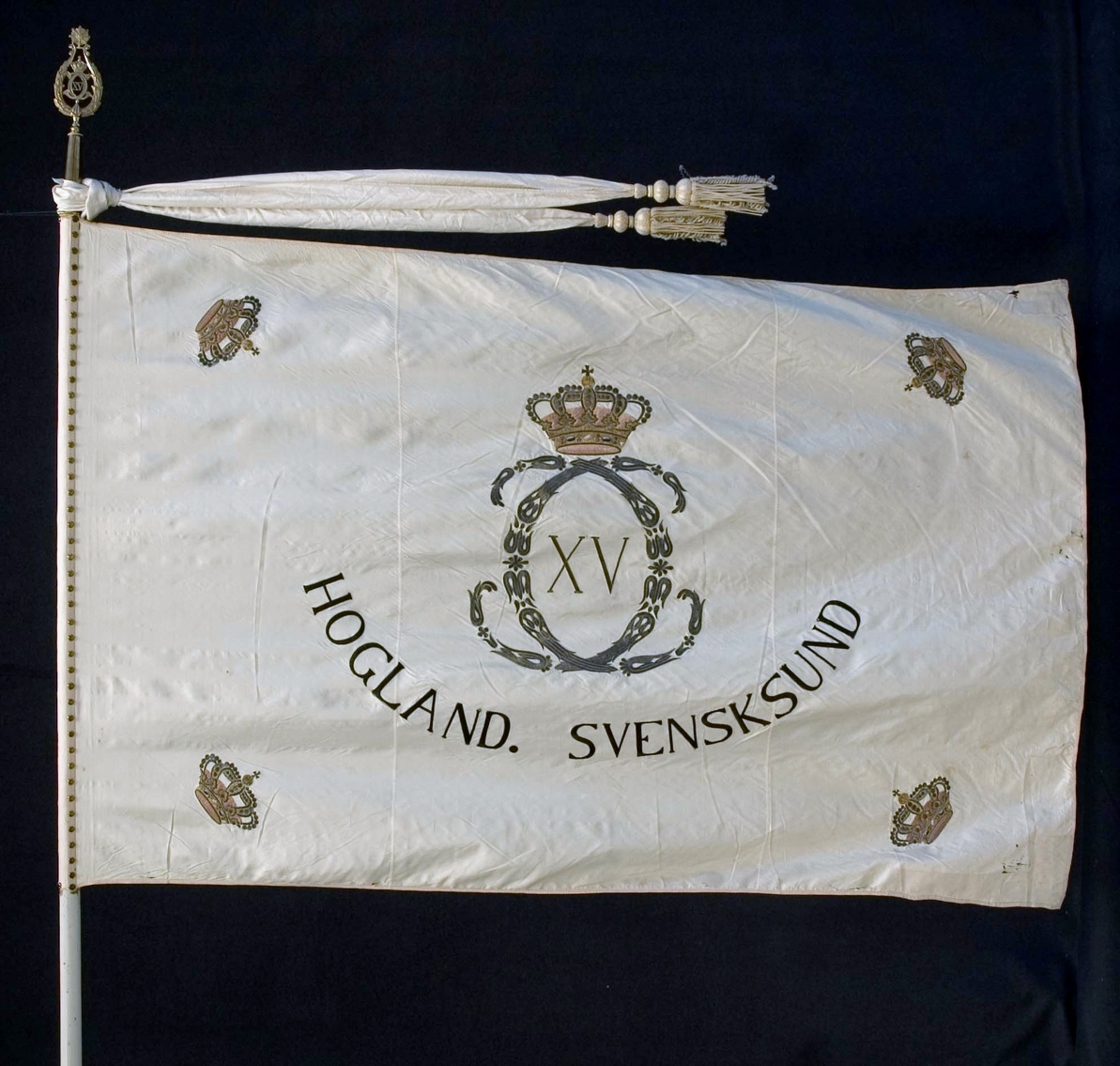
Colour m/1867 of the Marine Regiment and later of the Karlskrona Grenadier Regiment.

=== March ===
The regiment had two marches, "Finska rytteriets marsch" (unknown) and "Erzherzog Albrecht" (Komzak). The "Finska rytteriets marsch" also came from 1916 to be used by Norrbotten Regiment (I 19). Both marches were adopted in 1912 by Karlskrona Grenadier Regiment.

=== Battle honours ===
Karlskrona Grenadier Regiment inherited its battle honours from Småland Grenadier Corps, which in turn originated from Småland Hussar Regiment. The battle honours were determined by various colour committees consisting of war historians, but since the colours and standards were rarely replaced, some units never received any new colours before they were disbanded. Therefore, Karlskrona Grenadier Regiment never got the battle honours that it were actually entitled to on their own colour.

- Wallhof (1626),
- Werben (1631)
- Breitenfeld 1631)
- Lützen (1632)
- Oldendorf (1633)
- Wittstock (1636)
- Golomb (1656)
- Gnesen (1656)
- Warschau (1656)
- Frederiksodde (1657)
- Bält (1658)
- Lund (1676)
- Landskrona (1677)
- Kliszów (1702)
- Pultusk (1703)
- Warschau (1705)
- Holowczyn (1708)
- Svensksund (1790)

== Commanding officers ==
Regimental commanders from 1902 to 1927.

- 1902–1911: Christofer Lemchen
- 1911–1925: Axel Meister
- 1925–1927: Ernst Lind af Hageby

== Names, designations and locations ==
Name	Translation	From		To
Kungl. Karlskrona grenadjärregemente	Royal Karlskrona Grenadier Regiment	1902-01-01	–	1927-12-31
Kungl. Kronobergs regementes fästningsbataljon i Karlskrona	Royal Kronoberg Regiment's Fortress Battalion in Karlskrona	1928-01-01	–	1939-09-30
Designation		From		To
№ 7		1902-01-01	–	1914-09-30
I 7		1914-10-01	–	1927-12-31
I 11 K		1928-01-01	–	1939-09-30
Location		From		To
Bredåkra		1902	–	1916
Rosenholm		1916	–	1927

== See also ==
- List of Swedish infantry regiments
