= Marine regiment =

Marine Regiment may refer to:

- Marine Regiment (Denmark), the naval infantry of the Royal Danish Navy between 1672 and 2000
- Marine Regiment (France), an infantry regiment of the Kingdom of France between 1635 and 1793
- Marine Regiment (Sweden), a naval artillery unit within the Swedish Navy between 1824 and 1886

== See also ==
- List of United States Marine Corps regiments
