= Hakkapeliittain Marssi =

Finnish and Swedish military march

- Military march
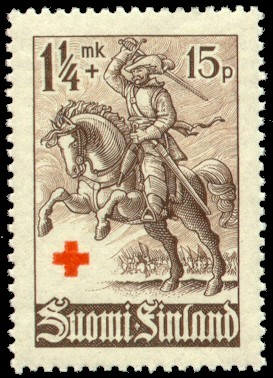
- Postage stamp depicting a Finnish Hakkapeliitta cavalryman.
- English: March of the Hakkapeliittas, March of the Finnish Cavalry
- Native name: Hakkapeliittain Marssi, Finska Rytteriets Marsch
- Text: by Zacharias Topelius,
- Language: Finnish, Swedish
- Swedish recording sung a cappella by Svea Jansson

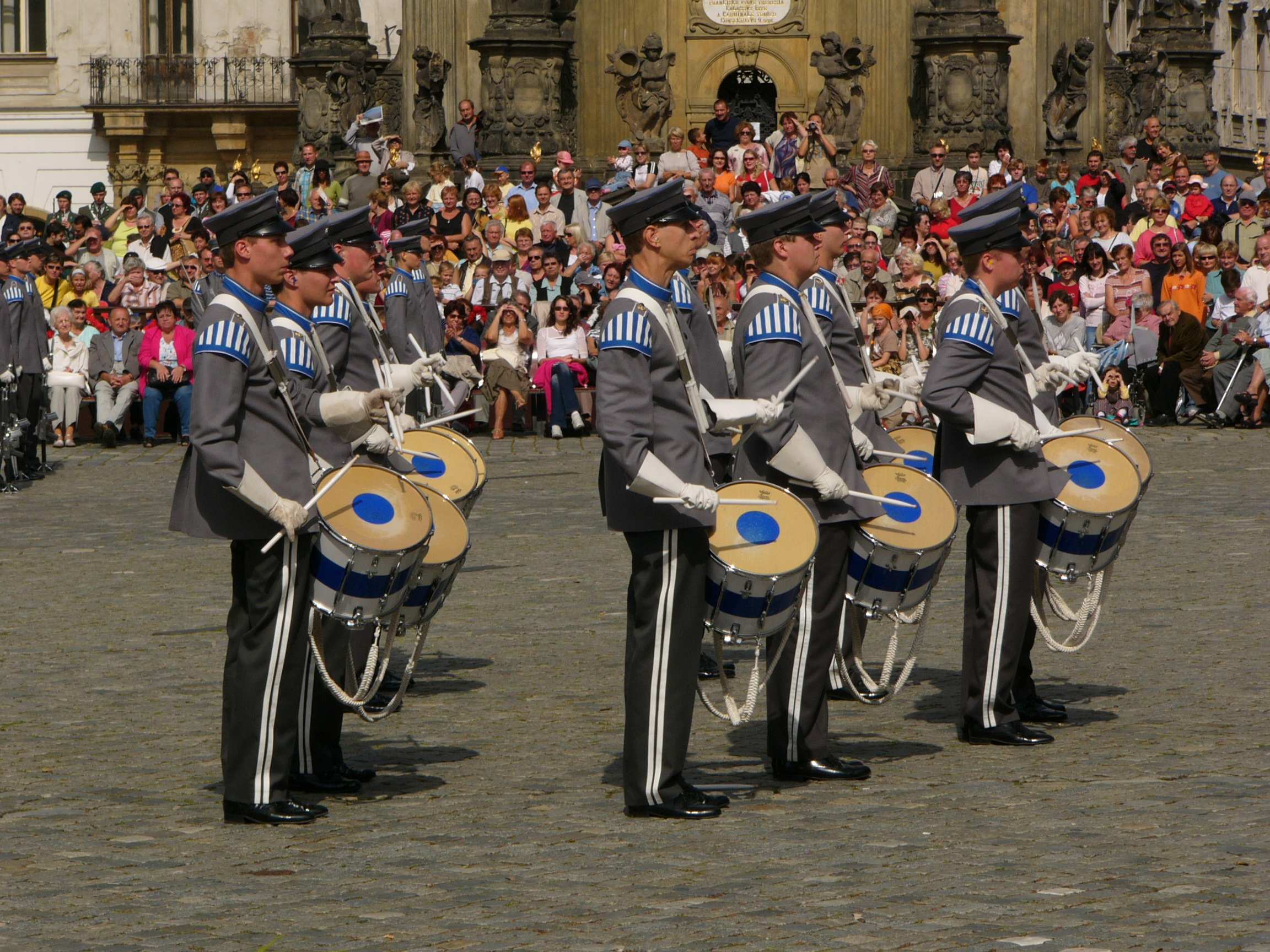
The Conscript Band of the Finnish Defence Forces

Hakkapeliittain Marssi (Finnish for 'March of the Hakkapeliittas') or Finska Rytteriets Marsch (Swedish for 'March of the Finnish Cavalry') is a Finnish and Swedish military (specifically, cavalry) march, and one of the oldest currently played.

== Background ==
The march originates from the times of Thirty Years' War when a Finnish light cavalryman was known as a Hakkapeliitta, and it became popular with military bands. Its most familiar lyrics were written in 1872 by Fenno-Swedish poet Zacharias Topelius; the piece is commonly known as the "March of the Finnish Cavalry during the Thirty Years War". The Prussian army officially adopted it for use in 1891; it is now a standard of the German marching band repertoire.

In Finland the march is currently the honorary march of the Finnish Army and the Defence Command. Previously the march was used by Häme Cavalry Regiment and Uusimaa Dragoon Regiment with their respective trumpet signals. The march is also the official regimental march of the Swedish Småland Grenadier Corps (No 7), the Karlskrona Grenadier Regiment (I 7), the Småland Hussar Regiment (K 4), the Norrbotten Regiment (I 19) and the Norrbotten Brigade (MekB 19).

In 1939, Finnish composer Uuno Klami developed a free orchestral version of this theme under the title Suomalaisen ratsuväen marssi, 'March of the Finnish Cavalry', Op. 28. The Finnish poet Eino Leino published another Hakkapeliittain Marssi as part of a collection by the name of Tähtitarha (lit. 'Garden of stars') in 1912.

== Names ==
The march is known by several names in different languages:

- Finnish:
  - Hakkapeliittain marssi, 'March of the Hakkapeliittas'
  - Suomalaisen ratsuväen marssi 30-vuotisessa sodassa, 'March of the Finnish cavalry in the Thirty Years' War'
- Swedish:
  - Finska rytteriets marsch, 'March of the Finnish cavalry'
  - Finska rytteriets marsch i trettioåriga kriget, 'March of the Finnish cavalry in the Thirty Years' War'
- German:
  - Marsch der Finnländischen Reiterei im 30-jährigen Kriege, 'March of the Finnish cavalry in the Thirty Years' War'
  - Schwedischer Reitermarsch, 'Swedish cavalry march'

== Lyrics ==
Finnish lyrics

On Pohjolan hangissa meill' isänmaa
sen rannalla loimuta lietemme saa;
käs' säilöjä käyttäiss' on varttunut siell’
on kunnialle, uskolle hehkunut miel’

Kun ratsujamme Nevan vuossa uitettihin
Se ui kuni häihin yli Veikselinkin.
Se kalpamme kostavan Reinille toi
ja Tonavasta Keisarin maljan se joi!

Kun raunion, tuhkan yli lennetähän,
niin kaviotpa loimun luo säihkyävän'
Jok' isku se hehkuu kuin aamun koi
ja vapauden puolesta säilämme soi!

Finnish alternative lyrics

On pohjolan hangissa maa isien
saa loimuta lietemme rannoilla sen
me kasvoimme kalpaan mi mainetta suo
ja uskon huomisen kun sä luontoomme luot

Ja ratsuamme Nevan vuossa juotettihin
se uljaasti ui yli Veikselinkin!
Se kalpamme Reinin rannalle toi
ja Tonavasta Keisarin maljan se joi!

Yli rovion tuhkan kun karautamme
tuli kipunoi kavioista ratsujemme!
Ja missä nämä säilämme säihkyy ja lyö
siel vapaus on kallistunut ja väistyköön!

Swedish original lyrics

Den snöiga nord är vårt fädernesland,
där sprakar vår härd på den stormiga strand,
där växte vid svärdet vår seniga arm,
där glödde för tro och för ära vår barm.

Vi vattnade i Nevans bad vår frustande häst
han sam över Weichseln så glad som till fest,
han bar över Rhen vårt hämnande stål,
han drack utur Donau kejsarens skål.

Och rida vi fram öfver slätter och däld,
så springa ur hofvarna gnistor af eld,
så haglar vårt hugg som ett hammarslag,
så ljusnar för världen en framtids dag.

Var tröst, du som suckar i mörker och band!
Vi komma, vi komma, vi lösa din hand.
Där pustar ej träl i vår frostiga nord;
friborne vi rida i fält för Guds ord.

Vid Breitenfeld vi togo Pappenheim i vår famn;
vi skrefvo på Kronenbergs brynja vårt namn;
vi svedde grått skägg för Tilly vid Lech;
vi blödde med kungsblod vid Lützens häck.

Och rida vi långt från vårt nordliga spår,
till glödande druvor och blödande sår,
så smattra trumpeterna segerbud.
Hugg in, tappra led! Fram! Med oss är Gud.

English literal translation

The snowy north is our fatherland;
there our hearth crackles on the stormy beach.
There our sinewy arm grew by the sword,
there our chest burned with faith and honour.

We watered our snorting horse in the Neva's bath;
he swam across the Vistula as happy as to a feast,
he carried our avenging steel over the Rhine,
he drank the emperor's toast from the Danube.

And if we ride forth over ash and gravel,
from the hoofs spring sparks of light,
each cut like the blow of a hammer descends
and for the world a future day dawns.

Take heart, you who dwell in darkness and chains!
We’re coming, we’re coming, we will free your hand.
Slaves do not sigh in our frosty North;
freeborn we ride into the field for God’s word.

At Breitenfeld we took Pappenheim into our arms;
we wrote on Kronenberg’s armour our name;
we burnt Tilly’s beard grey at Lech;
we bled with our King’s blood at Lützen’s hedge.

And if we ride far from our northern track,
to glowing grapes and bleeding wounds,
then the trumpets call the message of our victory.
Cut them down, brave ranks! Forward! With us is God.

English poetic translation

Our homeland lies in the snows of the North;
the hearth of the home glowing warm and strong
Our hand has grown sure with playing the sword
and honour and pure faith lies in our record

At the river Neva our mounts did draw their first blood
like in a wedding march they went across the Vistula flood
Our swords they did bring to the Rhineland's coast
and by the Danube they raised up the Emperor's toast!

And if forth over ash and gravel we ride,
the hoofs sparking light from its hidden hide;
Like a dawn, every hit will brightly shine
and for freedom our blades very audible chime!
Like a dawn, every hit will brightly shine
and for freedom our blades very audible chime!
