= Västernorrland Regiment =

Swedish Army infantry unit

- Västernorrlands regemente
- Active: 1869–1983, 1991–2000, 2022–present
- Country: Sweden
- Allegiance: Swedish Armed Forces
- Branch: Swedish Army
- Type: Infantry
- Size: Regiment
- Part of: 5th Military District (1869–1888); 6th Military District (1889–1893); 6th Army Division (1893–1901); VI Army Division (1902–1927); Northern Army Division (1928–1936); II Army Division (1937–1942); II.milo (1942–1966); Milo NN (1966–1983); Sollefteå Army Garrison (1983–1990); Milo NN (1990–1993); Milo N (1993–1997)
- Garrison/HQ: Sollefteå
- Mottos: För ditt land, Din hembygd, Ditt regemente (Note: The motto was adopted in 1936 in connection with the formation of the regiment's companion association. The motto is today also used by the 15th Home Guard Battalion.) ("For your country, your hometown, your regiment")
- Colors: Green and white
- March: "Västernorrlands regementes marsch" (Rydberg, Faust) (Note: The march was adopted in 1901 and was established in 1953 by Army Order 33/1953. The march was used by Ångermanland Brigade (Ångermanlandsbrigaden) from 1994 to 2000 and by the Västernorrland Group (Västernorrlandsgruppen) from 2000 to 2004.)

Commanders
- Current commander: COL Joakim Karlquist
- Notable commanders: Bo Boustedt, Stig Synnergren, Åke Sagrén

Insignia
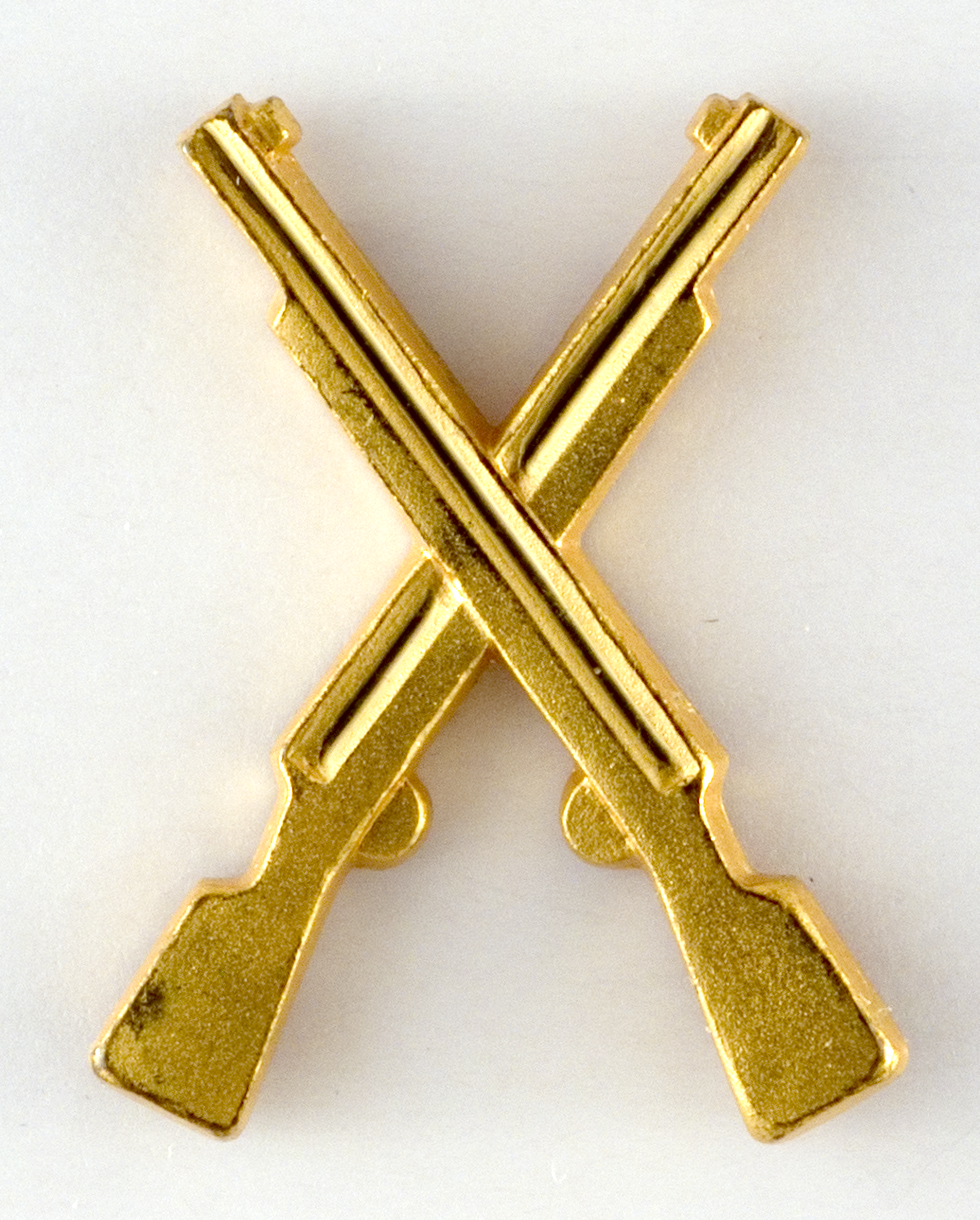
- Branch insignia m/60

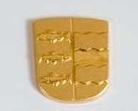
- Unit insignia m/60

The Västernorrland Regiment (Swedish: Västernorrlands regemente), designation I 21, is a Swedish Army infantry unit which operated in various forms the years 1869–1983, 1991–2000 and from 2022. It is located in Sollefteå Garrison in Sollefteå with a detachment in Östersund.

== History ==
The regiment was the only regiment that grew out of the 1812 conscription organization and originated in Västernorrland Conscription Battalion (Västernorrlands beväringsbataljon) which was formed on 19 October 1854. The conscription battalion was until 29 March 1869 subordinate to the commander of Jämtland Ranger Corps (No 23). From 29 March 1869, the battalion became an independent unit and on 1 January 1887, the name Västernorrland Battalion was adopted. On 1 January 1893, the battalion was reorganized into a regiment and adopted the name Västernorrland Regiment (No 29), which in 1902 was adjusted to No 28. In 1914, all order numbers within the Swedish Army were adjusted. For Västernorrland Regiment, this meant that the regiment was assigned the designation I 28. The adjustment of the designation was made to distinguish the regiments in the various branches but also to distinguish the regiments from their possible reserve regiments where a main regiment, for example, had the designation I 11 and the reserve regiment had the designation I 111.

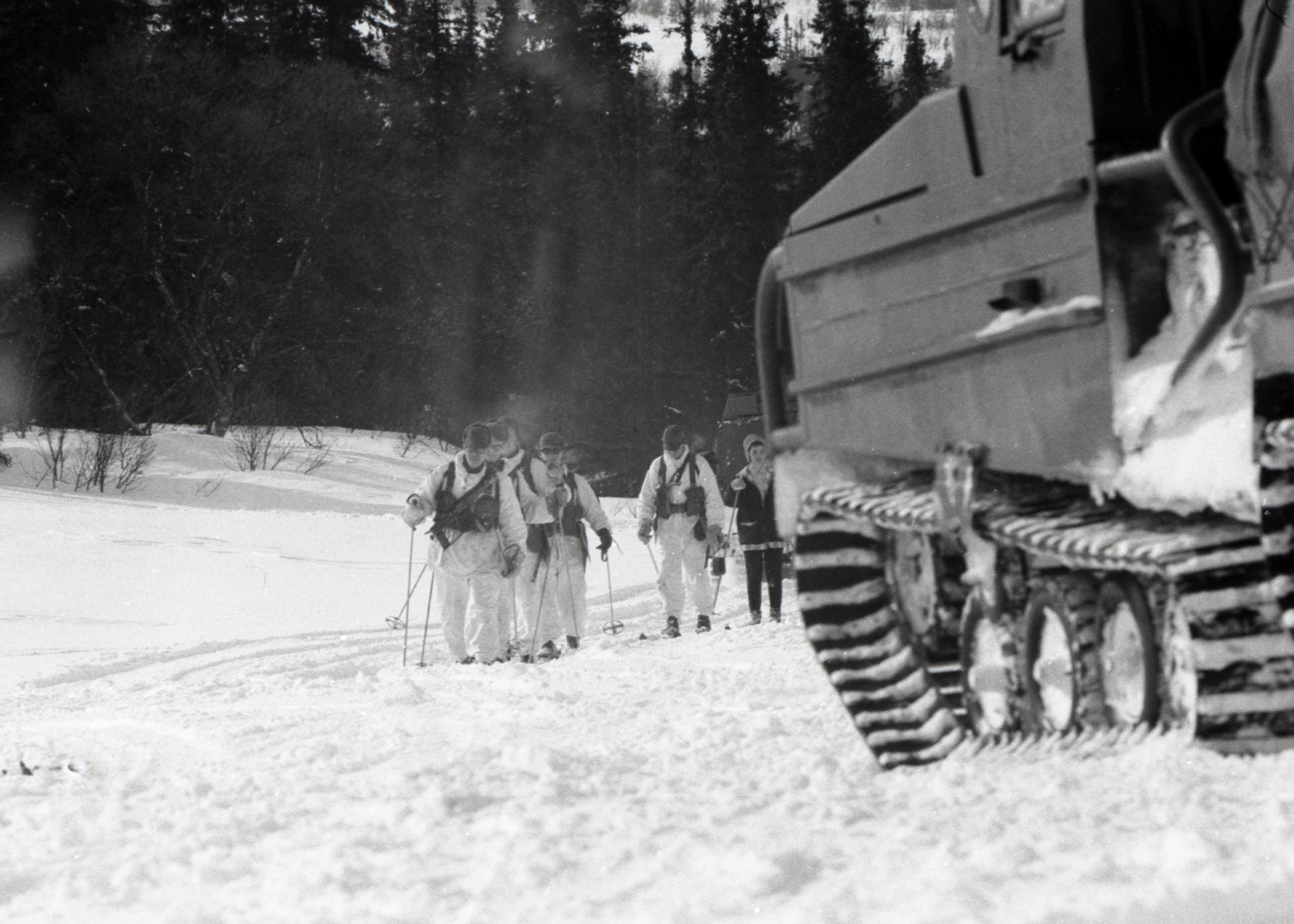
Winter exercise in Jämtland in March 1966 with conscripts from Västernorrland Regiment.

The regiment survived the disbandment in connection with the Defence Act of 1925 but most of the remaining infantry regiments were reduced by one battalion and from 1 January 1928, Västernorrland Regiment came to consist of two infantry battalions. Furthermore, the regiment was assigned with the designation I 21 when the unit designations in the lower series became vacant, by the Kalmar Regiment being disbanded. In May 1931, parts of the regiment were stationed in Ådalen following a request from the county administrative board to assist the police in curbing a labor dispute, a conflict that later came to be known as the Ådalen shootings. In connection with the OLLI reform, which was implemented in the Swedish Armed Forces between 1973 and 1975, A units and B units were formed. The A units were the defence district regiments (försvarsområdesregemente), the regiments that were given responsibility for a defence district and the mobilization and materiel responsibility within the defence district. The B units were pure training units. This meant that Norrland Logistic Regiment (T 3) which was part of Härnösand Defence District (Härnösands försvarsområde, Fo 23) became a B unit, while Västernorrland Regiment (I 21) on 1 July 1974 was amalgamated with Härnösand Defence District, which was also renamed Västernorrland Defence District, and formed the defence district regiment I 21/Fo 23, an A unit.

On 1 July 1983, the regiment was amalgamated in Sollefteå Army Garrison (Sollefteå armégarnison, SAG), which was a pilot organization, consisting of Västernorrland Regiment (I 21), the defence district staff (Fo 23), Ådal Brigade (Ådalsbrigaden, IB 21), Ångermanland Brigade (Ångermanlandsbrigaden, NB 51) and Norrland Logistic Regiment. On 30 June 1990, the pilot organization was disbanded and from 1 July 1990, Västernorrland Regiment became an independent unit again. However, the defence district staff came to form its own authority. Through Defence Investigation 88, it was clear that four brigade-producing regiments would be disbanded. The background was that the economic problems that arose in the Swedish defence during the 1970s and 1980s remained and were not solved in connection with the Defence Act of 1987. The Carlsson I Cabinet therefore requested a new investigation from the Supreme Commander of the Swedish Armed Forces, General Bengt Gustafsson, the Defence Investigation 88 (FU 88), on the army development. The investigation led to the Riksdag in December 1989 deciding that the army from 1 July 1992 would be reduced by 11 brigades and consist of 18 brigades. The brigades that were disbanded were all organized according to IB 66M, which among other things concerned the Ådal Brigade (Ådalsbrigaden). Furthermore, it was also decided that Norrland Logistic Regiment would be co-located with Västernorrland Regiment and thereby concentrate the Sollefteå Garrison on Regementsvägen in Sollefteå.

Through the Defence Act of 1992, it was decided that the Ångermanland Brigade would be separated from the regiment, this on the basis that the government wanted the Swedish Armed Forces' basic organization to reflect the war organization. The brigade was separated from the regiment on 1 July 1994 and became a cadre-organized war unit within the Northern Military District (Milo N). From the same date, the defence district staff was re-incorporated into the regiment. Prior to the Defence Act of 1996, a new division of defence districts was proposed, which meant that three defence district staffs in the Northern Military District (Milo N) would be disbanded on 31 December 1997. The three staffs proposed for disbandment were in Kalix, Kiruna and Östersund. Regarding the staff in Östersund, it was proposed together with the staff in Sollefteå to form a common defence district. The defence district staff in Östersund was officially disbanded on 31 December 1997. From 1 January 1998, Jämtland Defence District (Jämtlands försvarsområde Fo 22) was integrated into Västernorrland Defence District (Västernorrlands försvarsområde, Fo 23), which adopted the name Västernorrland and Jämtland Defence District (Västernorrlands och Jämtlands försvarsområde, Fo 23). In support of the Home Guard and the voluntary activities within the former Jämtland Defence District, the defence district group Jämtlandsgruppen was formed.

Prior to the Defence Act of 2000, the government proposed in its bill to the Riksdag that the tactical level should be reduced by phasing out division and defence district staffs as well as naval commands and air commands. This is to design an Army Tactical Command, Naval Tactical Command and Air Force Tactical Command which would be co-located with the Joint Operations Command (Operationsledningen, OpL). The proposal meant that all defence district staffs would be disbanded, which included Småland Regiment. Furthermore, the government proposed to the Riksdag a sharp reduction of army units, which meant, among other things, that of 13 brigade units within the army, only six units would remain for the training of army brigade commanders and mechanized battalions. Furthermore, it was considered that they would be relatively evenly geographically distributed across the country. In central Norrland, the government proposed in its bill that the Jämtland Ranger Brigade (Fältjägarbrigaden, NB 5) should remain in favor of the Ångermanland Brigade (NB 21). Sollefteå Garrison was considered to have good infrastructural and training conditions as well as Östersund Garrison. However, the government considered that the conditions for a continued development of the garrison in Östersund were better than in Sollefteå. In Östersund's favor, the other units that were within the garrison, Jämtland Wing (F 4), the Swedish Army Technical School (Arméns tekniska skola, ATS) and the Motor School (Motorskolan, MS). Relocating the Army Technical School to another location was not considered economically defensible by the government. The schools were considered to be able to provide staff and skills with the help of the fact that a brigade remained in Östersund. Furthermore, the government pointed out that due to the distance, it should be easier for the staff in Sollefteå to move to Östersund than to, for example, Boden, which would reduce a possible loss of competence in the army.

From 1 July 2000, the activities of the regiment passed to the Ångermanland Decommissioning Organisation until the decommissioning was completed by 31 December 2001. The Decommissioning Organisation had the task of disbanding the regiment, but also the other units affected by decommissioning in Västernorrland County - Ångermanland Brigade, Norrland Logistic Corps (T 3) and the Norrland Coast Naval Command (Norrlandskustens marinkommando, MKN). On 30 June 2001, the Ångermanland Decommissioning Organisation ceased to exist when the decommissioning of the units was considered complete.

On 14 May 2019, the Swedish Parliamentary Defence Commission (Försvarsberedningen) submitted its report Värnkraft to Minister of Defence Peter Hultqvist. In the report, the Defence Commission proposed, among other things, that the war organization should be provided with four regionally trained territorial infantry battalions, in addition to the infantry battalion proposed on Gotland. For geographical, emergency preparedness and training reasons, the Defence Commission assessed that two new basic organizational units needed to be established in the form of two smaller regiments. The proposed regiments were considered to have an annual training capacity of about 200-250 conscripts. In the long run and after further investments and additional resources, the regiments were considered to be able to increase the training volume to meet the need for infantry units for up to one brigade. The conscripts were to a large extent recruited regionally to, among other things, ensure a high level of preparedness in the military units. The Defence Commission stated that Falun, Härnösand, Sollefteå and Östersund, among others, had shown interest in establishing military units. Prior to the Defence Act of 2020, the Swedish government presented an agreement on 12 October 2020, to re-establish Västernorrland Regiment in Sollefteå from 2022. The government stated that a re-establishment in Sollefteå was considered important for the protection of the connections to Trondheim, which among other things affects the United States Marine Corps's pre-placed equipment in Trøndelag. It was also proposed that Jämtland Ranger Corps be attached to Västernorrland Regiment as a training detachment in Östersund. The basic training in Sollefteå would correspond to two local defence infantry battalions and in Östersund one local defence infantry battalion.

By 1 March 2021, the Swedish Armed Forces would report the agency's planning to the Government Offices (Ministry of Defence) on the re-establishment of Västernorrland Regiment (I 21) in Sollefteå, with the training detachment Jämtland Ranger Corps in Östersund. On 26 February 2021, the Swedish Armed Forces presented its budget documentation for 2022, in which the Swedish Armed Forces presented its planning, preparations and activities in order to be able to re-establish the regiments designated by the Defence Act. Västernorrland Regiment was proposed to be established from the fourth quarter of 2021, initially with the majority of operations starting from Östersund and with regimental command in Sollefteå. The background to the proposal was based on the fact that the Swedish Armed Forces, through existing premises, previously conducted operations in Östersund, which enables training activities from the period 2022–2023 in Östersund and after new construction from 2024 also in Sollefteå. On 16 June 2021, the Swedish Armed Forces announced the commanders of the newly established units. Colonel Jonas Karlsson was appointed the new regimental commander of Västernorrland Regiment and formally took up his position in connection with the regiment being re-established in the first quarter of 2022. On 6 December 2021, the regimental staff was established in Sollefteå, where they are initially grouped temporarily in the old barracks at barracks establishments north of Riksväg 90. On 16 January 2022, Västernorrland Regiment was inaugurated through a ceremony in the regimental park, where Prince Carl Philip, Duke of Värmland, among others, represents the court. The Supreme Commander of the Swedish Armed Forces, General Micael Bydén, Minister of Defence Peter Hultqvist and the governors from both Västernorrland County and Jämtland County. On 8 August 2022, the regiment plans to receive the first conscripts.

== Barracks and training areas ==
=== Barracks ===
When the Allotment system was abolished and the conscript army was introduced in the early 20th century, the regiment moved to the newly built barracks in Sollefteå on 5 April 1911. However, the fact that the regiment was moved to Sollefteå was not a matter of course, when the army proposed that the regiment should be placed in Härnösand. The regimental commander Selander expressed himself: "A barracks in Sollefteå would become morally ruinous for the officers." For strategic reasons, partly because of the Forsmo Bridge, it was decided that the regiment should be placed in Sollefteå.

The barracks establishment was built according to the 1901 Defense Reform Building Program, following the Fortifikationen's drawings for infantry barracks establishment. A total of 80 buildings were built in the area during its active time. On 1 July 1992, the barracks area was abandoned on Trängvägen, and Norrland Logistic Regiment (T 3) was co-located with the Västernorrland Regiment on Regementsvägen. When the garrison was concentrated on Regementsvägen, a larger extension of the garages and storage areas was made in autumn of 1993. After the garrison was disbanded, the area was sold to Vasallen, which developed the area for residential and office space.

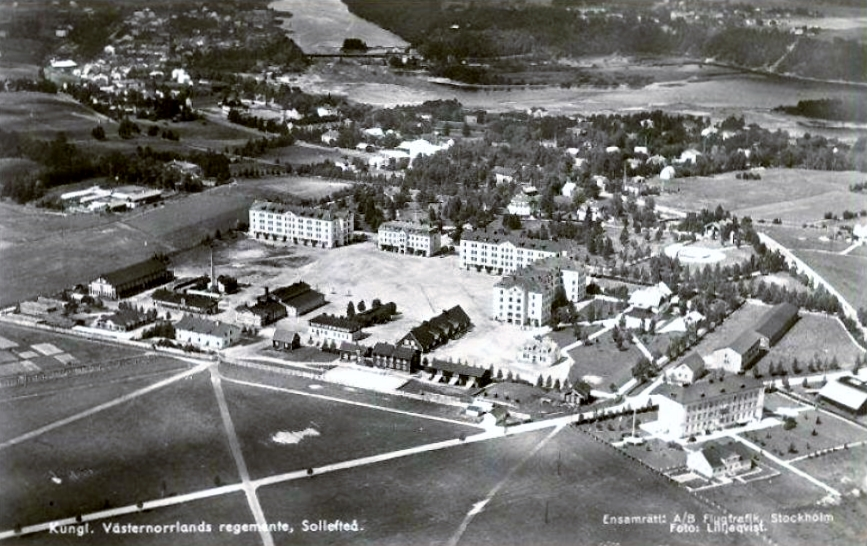
1930s aerial view

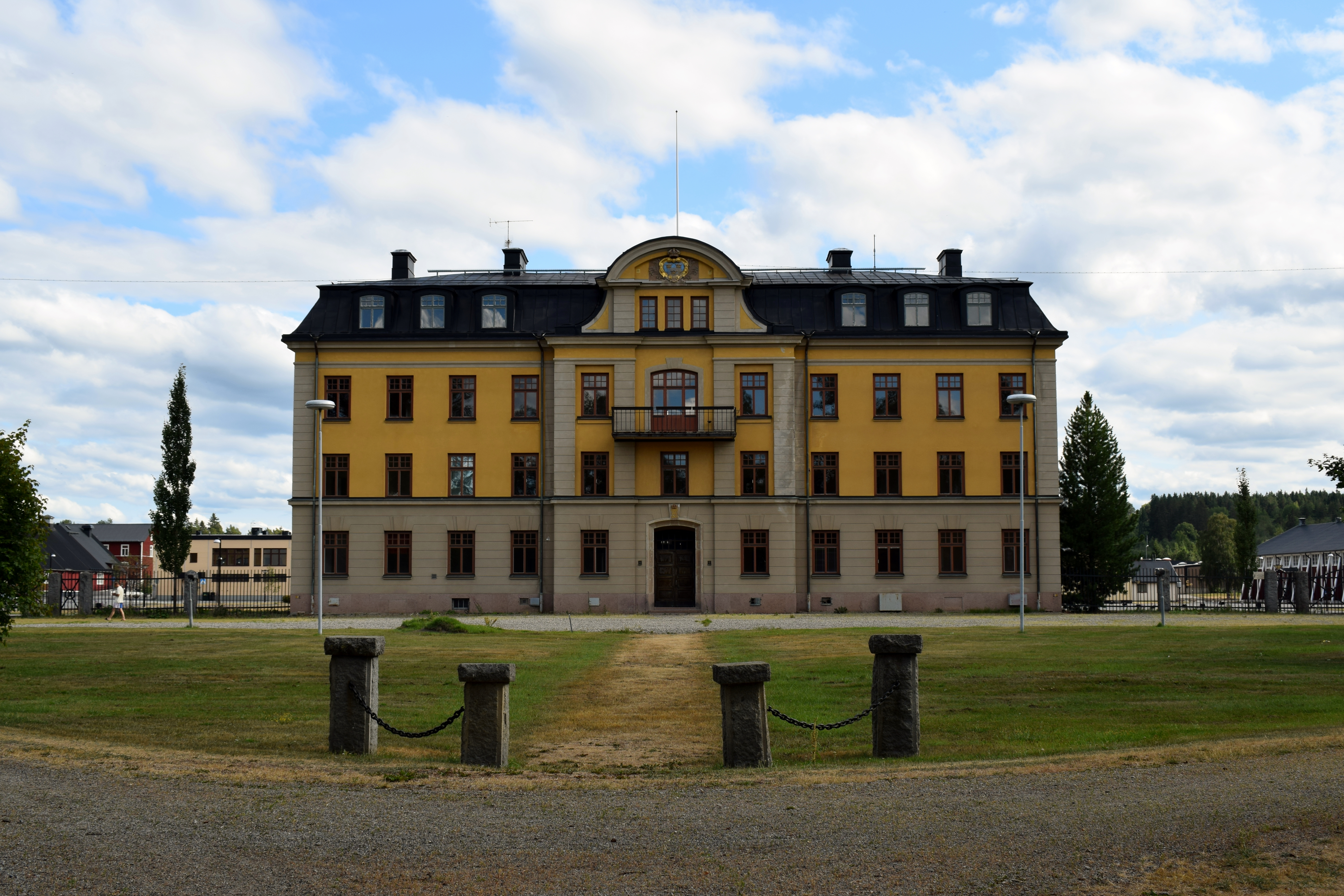
Chancellery building

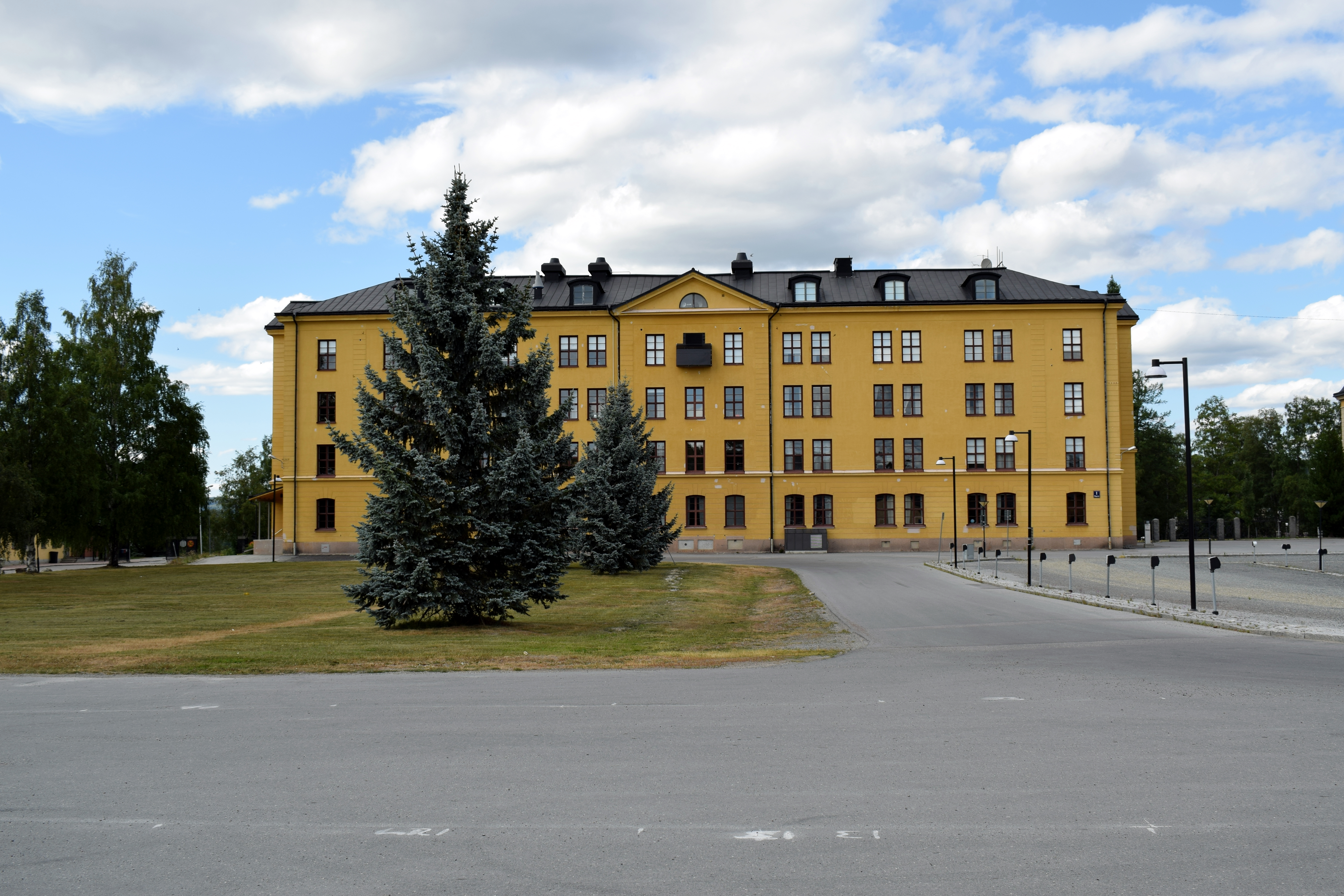
Barracks

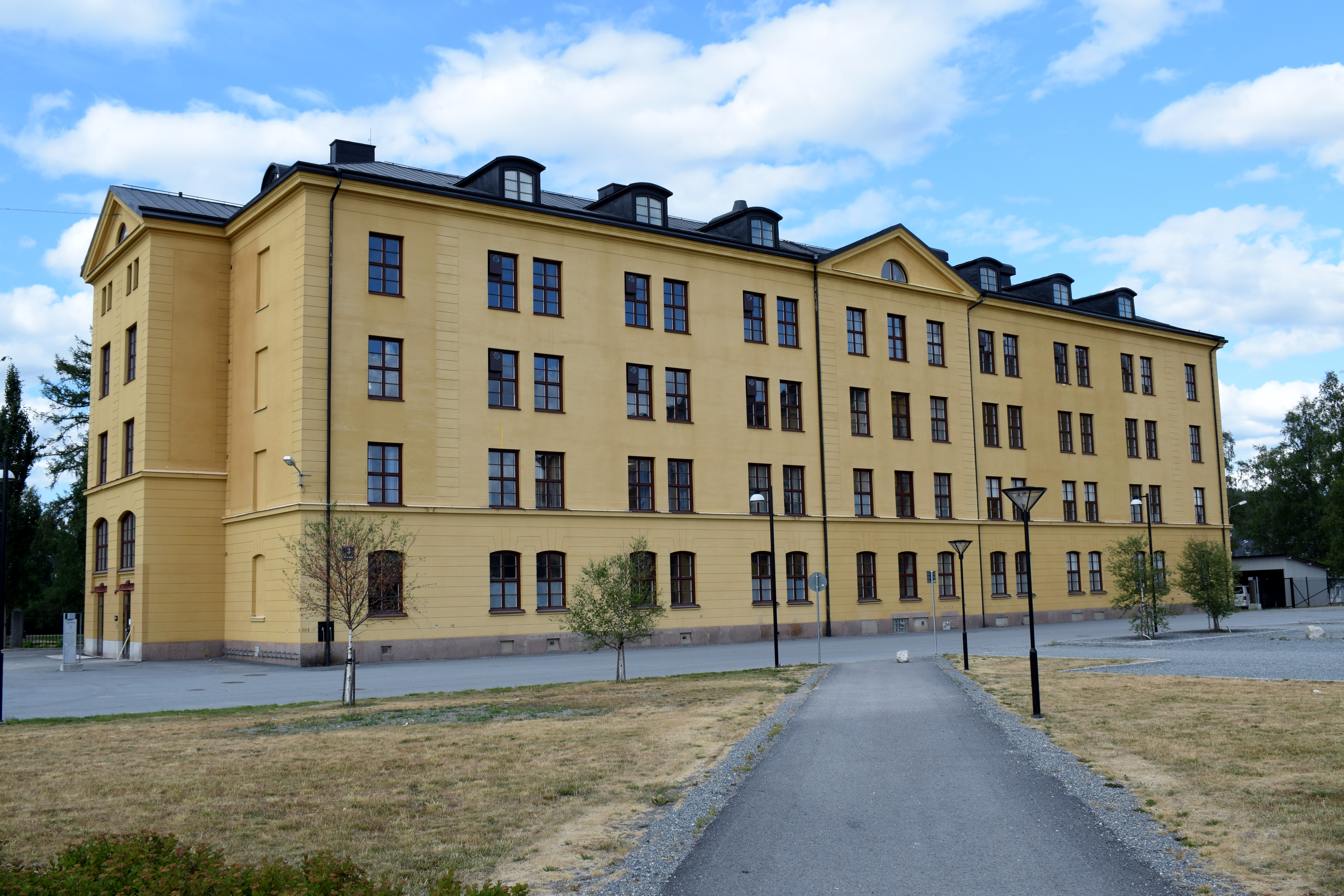
Barracks

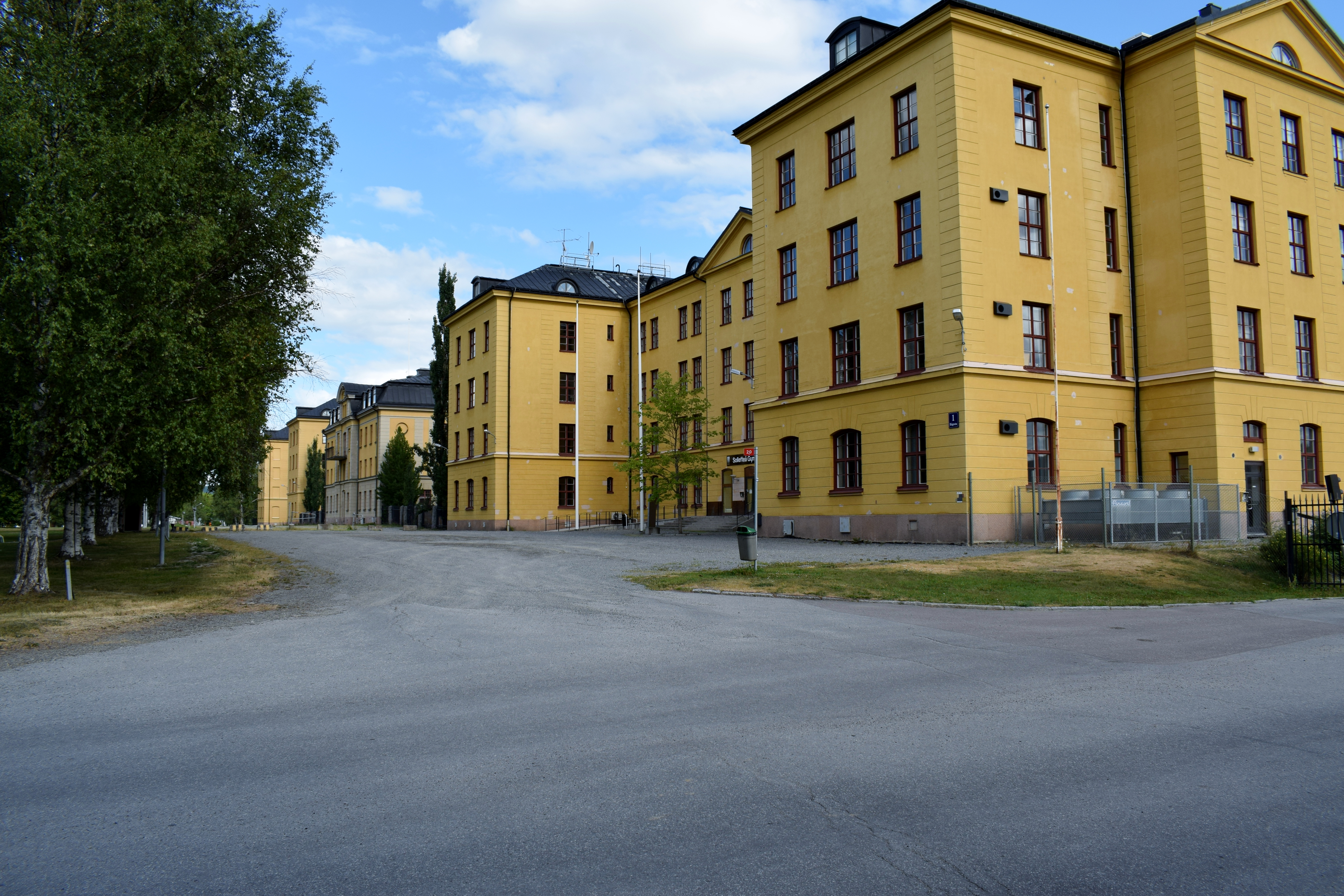
Barracks

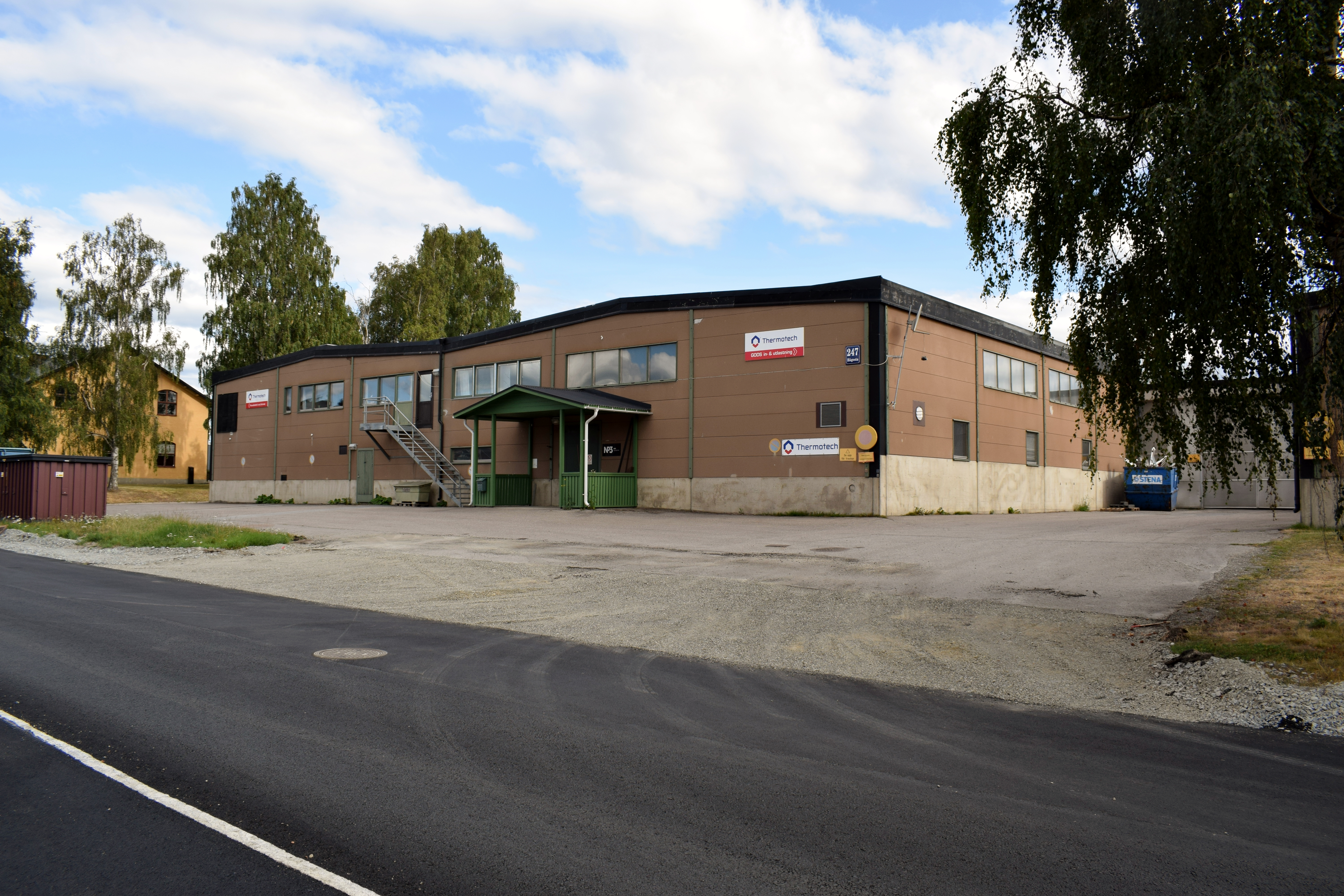
Storage building

=== Training areas ===
The regiment trained at Sånga mo and Sollefteå camp before moving to Sollefteå in 1911. In Sollefteå, the regiment was trained at Tjärnmyran's proving ground.

=== Detachment ===
In connection with the disbandment of Sundsvall Anti-Aircraft Regiment (Lv 5) on 30 June 1982, the operation was resumed in a decommissioning organisation from 1 July 1982. The decommissioning organisation in Sundsvall was subordinated and administered by the Västernorrland Regiment. The decommissioning organisation was dissolved on 31 December 1982. From 1 July 1982 a department was located in the former regimental barracks in Sundsvall where the schoolhouse and a barracks were used for voluntary activities.

== Heraldry and traditions ==
=== Colours, standards and guidons ===
A colour was presented to the Royal Västernorrland Regiment (I 21) at Nipvallen in Sollefteå by His Majesty the King Gustaf VI Adolf on 16 August 1960. It was used as regimental colour by I 21/Fo 23 until 1 July 2000. The colour was drawn by Brita Grep and embroidered by hand in insertion technique by the company Libraria. Blazon: "Per pale the provincial badge of Ångermanland; on blue three white salmons in pale, armed red, the middle one sinisterset, and the provincial badge of Medelpad; with waves four times divided in blue, white, red, white and blue."

=== Coat of arms ===
The coat of the arms of the Västernorrland Regiment (I 21/Fo 23) 1977–1994 and the Ångermanland Brigade (Ångermanlandsbrigaden, NB 21) 1994–2000. Blazon: "Per pale azure, the provincial badge of Ångermanland, three salmons naiant in pale, the middle one sinister set, armed gules, and the provincial badge of Medelpad; with waves four times divided, azure, argent, gules, argent and azure. The shield surmounted two muskets in saltire or". The coat of arms of the Västernorrland Regiment (I 21/Fo 23) 1994–2000 and the Västernorrland Group (Västernorrlandsgruppen) 2000–2004. Blazon: "Per pale azure, the provincial badge of Ångermanland, three salmons naiant in pale, the middle one sinister set, armed gules and the provincial badge of Medelpad; with waves four times divided, azure, argent, gules, argent and azure. The shield surmounted two swords in saltire or".

Coat of arms of the Västernorrland Regiment (I 21/Fo 23) 1977–1994 and the Ångermanland Brigade (Ångermanlandsbrigaden, NB 21) 1994–2000.

Coat of the arms of the Västernorrland Regiment (I 21/Fo 23) 1994–2000 and the Västernorrland Group (Västernorrlandsgruppen) 2000–2004.

=== Medals ===
In 1974, the Västernorrlands regementes (I 21) och Ångermanlandsbrigadens (NB 21) förtjänstmedalj ("Västernorrland Regiment (I 21) and Ångermanland Brigade (NB 21) Medal of Merit") in gold and silver (VnorregÅngbrigGM/SM) of the 9th size was established. The medal ribbon is divided in green and white moiré.

In 2000, the Västernorrlands regementes (I 21) och Ångermanlandsbrigadens (NB 21) minnesmedalj ("Västernorrland Regiment (I 21) and Ångermanland Brigade (NB 21) Commemorative Medal") in silver (VnorrlregÅngermbrigMSM) of the 8th size was established. The medal ribbon is divided in green, white, green, white and green.

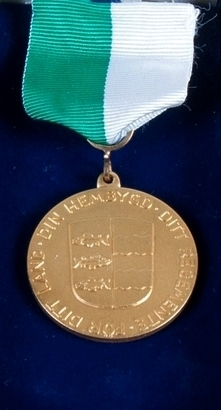
Västernorrland Regiment (I 21) and Ångermanland Brigade (NB 21) Medal of Merit in gold

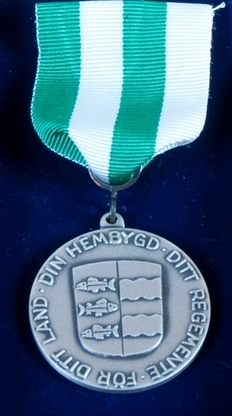
Västernorrland Regiment (I 21) and Ångermanland Brigade (NB 21) Medal of Merit in silver

== Commanding officers ==
Battalion and regimental commanders from 1869 to 2000. From 1974, the commanding officer was referred to as Defence District Commander, and held the rank of Senior Colonel. The regimental commander was from 1983 to 1990 also the commanding officer of Sollefteå Army Garrison (SAG).

=== Commander ===
- 1869–1873: Axel Georg Wästfelt
- 1873–1883: Carl Theodor Alexander Biörck
- 1883–1888: Sven Hjalmar Thestrup
- 1888–1893: Carl Vilhelm Knut von Rosen
- 1893–1899: Axel Gustaf Laurell
- 1899–1907: Nils Johan Teodor Selander
- 1907–1908: Hugo William Hamilton
- 1908–1913: Knut Johan Wilhelm Bergenstråhle
- 1913–1918: Carl Henrik Ulrik Scheffer
- 1918–1923: Colonel Bo Boustedt
- 1923–1930: Olof Herman Sundberg
- 1930–1935: Thord Richard Evers
- 1935–1937: Colonel Folke Högberg
- 1937–1942: Gösta Hollström
- 1942–1947: Magnus Elias Hedenlund
- 1947–1954: Erland Fredrik Lindhammar
- 1954–1958: Gustaf Wilhelm Reutersvärd
- 1958–1962: Georg von Boisman
- 1962–1963: Colonel Stig Synnergren
- 1963–1974: Colonel Anders Kjellgren
- 1974–1974: Colonel Bengt Sjöberg
- 1974–1977: Senior colonel Ingemar Grunditz
- 1978–1982: Senior colonel Bengt Sjöberg
- 1982–1983: Senior colonel Åke Sagrén
- 1983–1987: Colonel Lennart Rönnberg
- 1987–1989: Göte Bergerbrant
- 1989–1993: Karl Forssberg
- 1993–1997: Bo Svensson
- 1997–2000: Hans Georg Aminoff
- 2000–2022: –
- 2022–2025: Jonas Karlsson
- 2025–20xx: Joakim Karlquist

=== Deputy commander ===
- 1978–1982: Colonel Lars-Eric Widman

== Names, designations and locations ==
Name	Translation	From		To
Kungl. Västernorrlands beväringsbataljon	Royal Västernorrland Conscript Battalion	1869-03-29	–	1886-12-31
Kungl. Västernorrlands bataljon	Royal Västernorrland Battalion	1887-01-01	–	1892-12-31
Kungl. Västernorrlands regemente	Royal Västernorrland Regiment	1893-01-01	–	1974-06-30
Kungl. Västernorrlands regemente och försvarsområde	Royal Västernorrland Regiment and Defence District	1974-07-01	–	1974-12-31
Västernorrlands regemente och försvarsområde	Västernorrland Regiment and Defence District	1975-01-01	–	1983-06-30
Västernorrlands regemente och försvarsområde	Västernorrland Regiment and Defence District	1991-07-01	–	2000-06-30
Avvecklingsorganisation Ångermanland	Ångermanland Decommissioning Organisation	2000-07-01	–	2001-06-30
Västernorrlands regemente	Västernorrland Regiment	2022-01-16	–	
Designation		From		To
No. 29		1893-01-01	–	1901-12-31
No. 28		1902-01-01	–	1914-09-30
I 28		1914-10-01	–	1927-12-31
I 21		1928-01-01	–	1974-06-30
I 21/Fo 23		1974-07-01	–	1983-06-30
I 21/Fo 23		1991-07-01	–	2000-06-30
Ao Ång		2000-07-01	–	2001-06-30
I 21		2022-01-16	–	
Location		From		To
Sånga mo		1893-01-01	–	1899-??-??
Sollefteå läger		1899-??-??	–	1911-04-04
Sollefteå Garrison		1911-04-05	–	2001-06-30
Sollefteå Garrison		2022-01-16	–	

== See also ==
- List of Swedish infantry regiments
