= Värmlands Ranger Corps =

Värmland Ranger Corps
- Värmlands fältjägarkår
- Coat of arms for Värmland's Ranger Corps
- Active: 1790–1901
- Country: Sweden
- Allegiance: Swedish Armed Forces
- Branch: Swedish Army
- Type: Infantry
- Garrison: Karlstad Garrison, Karlstad
- Nickname: "Di gröne på Trossnäs" ("The Green Ones at Trossnäs")
- Colours: Green and Black
- March: "Donaugruss" (Král)

The Värmland Ranger Corps, (Swedish: Värmlands fältjägarkår), designation I 26, was an infantry unit of the Swedish Army that existed in various forms from 1790 to 1901. The unit headquarters was located at the Karlstad Garrison in Karlstad.

The Värmlands fältjägarkår was established in 1790 as an enlisted unit under the name Värmlands fotjägarbataljon (Värmland Foot Jäger Battalion). The battalion was raised to defend the border against Danish Norway. It consisted of three companies of 100 men each. Initially, it was subordinate to the Närke-Värmlands Regiment, and around 150 men were kept on permanent garrison duty in Karlstad.

During the campaign against Norway in 1808, the Foot Jäger Battalion served in the 1st Brigade under Colonel Leijonstedt and formed part of the army's right wing. Together with the Närke-Värmlands Jägers, they formed a strong battalion of about 600 men. The battalion fought at the Battle of Lier on 18 April 1808, where Captain Liljeström and Captain Matern particularly distinguished themselves. It also fought at Vastetud on 1 May, Mobäck on 18 May, Magnor on 19 July, and again at the same location on 22 September 1808. Later, it accompanied Georg Adlersparre's army, together with the Närke-Värmlands Regiment, to Stockholm to depose Gustav IV Adolf.

In 1812, the Field Jäger Corps was expanded by an additional battalion, although this battalion also consisted of only three companies. The corps now consisted of two battalions with a total strength of about 600 men and was renamed Värmlands fältjägarregemente (Värmland Field Jäger Regiment).

In 1813, the regiment was transported to Germany to participate in the War of the Sixth Coalition against Napoleon. It was assigned to the Swedish Army's 4th Brigade under Colonel Reuterskiöld and the 2nd Division under Major General Sandels. The regiment took part in all of the army's marches and fought in the Battle of Großbeeren on 23 August, Dennewitz on 6 September, and Leipzig on 18 October.

Afterward, the regiment took part in the campaign in Holstein and then in Belgium during 1814. In Belgium, it served in the brigade that blockaded the fortress of Maastricht on the east bank of the Meuse River between 10 March and 9 April.

After returning to Sweden in the summer of 1814, the regiment participated in the campaign against Norway. It belonged to the 7th Brigade under Colonel von Platen and the 4th Division under Major General Gustaf Fredrik Mörner. However, early in the campaign it was transferred to General Eberhard von Vegesack's division, which had begun the siege of Fredrikstad Fortress and was advancing northward.

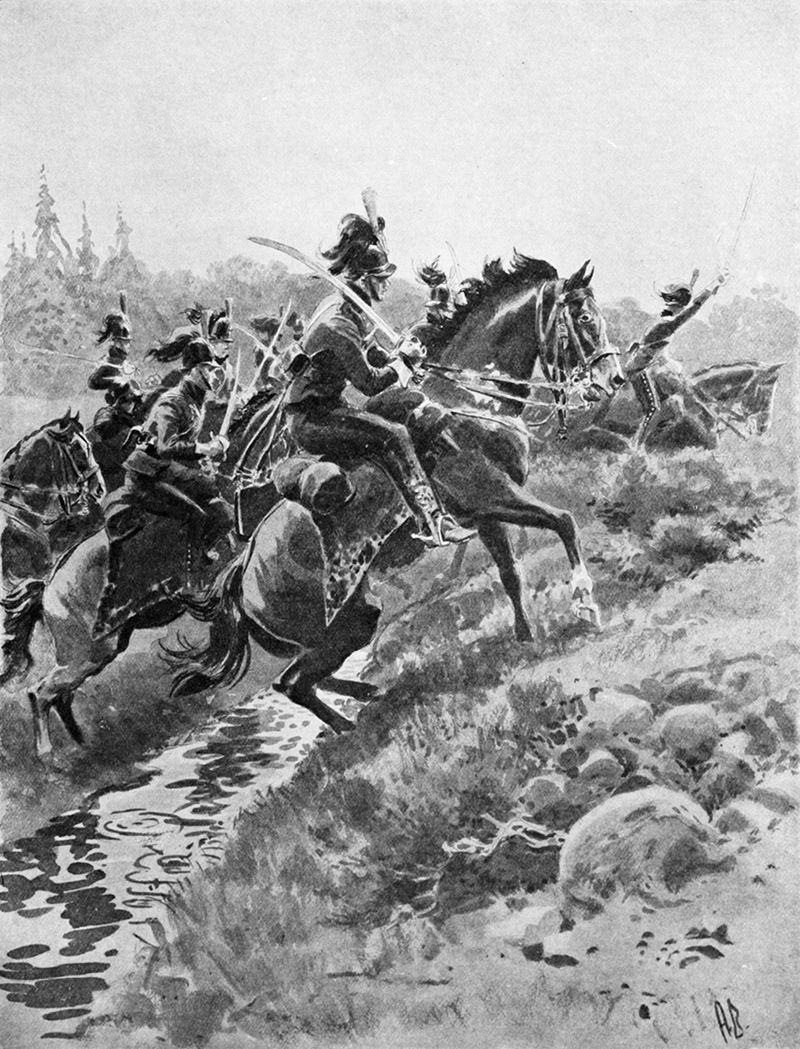
Swedish cavalry at Rakkestad, 1814

On 6 August 1814, the regiment fought at the Battle of Rakkestad. One battalion of the regiment led the assault by crossing a bridge built in front of the Norwegians' right flank and successfully drove the enemy from the bridge. The second battalion, attacked at the head of a force that crossed another smaller bridge in the center of the front.

The system of rank order established in the 1634 Instrument of Government began to falter and create gaps following the Treaty of Fredrikshamn on 17 September 1809, when Finland became part of Russia and the Swedish regiments in Finland were disbanded. This created a need for a new system. Under Crown Prince Karl Johan, a new numbering system was introduced in 1816, whereby the Swedish regiments were given official numerical designations through a general order dated on 26 March 1816.

The basis for the numbering was not only the status of the regiment, but also the established order of the Swedish provinces, as well as Svealand, Götaland, and Norrland being treated as separate entities. These numbers had nothing to do with the actual rank order, which is also evident from old lists in which infantry and cavalry formations are mixed together according to rank and precedence.

== Locations and training grounds ==
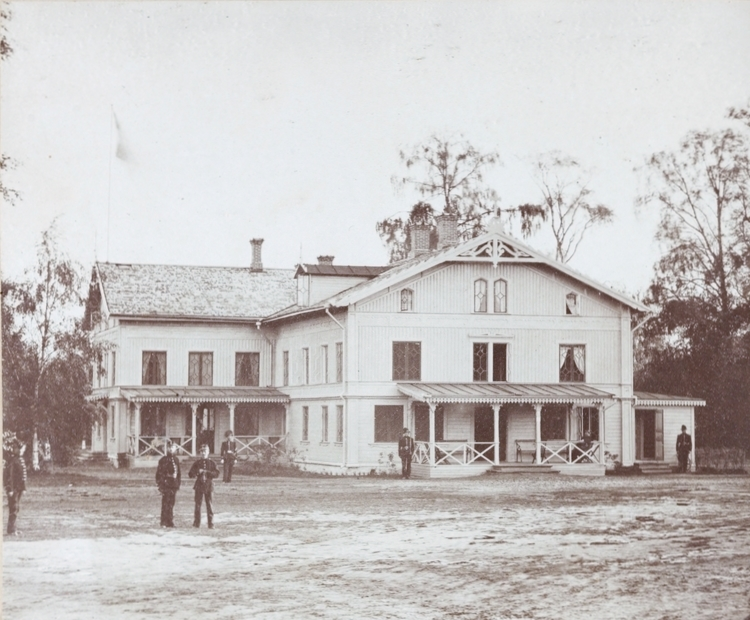
Trossnäs Field

Drill exercises were originally held at Nya Torget, Salttorget, and Djäknefältet in Karlstad. Shooting exercises were held at Djäknefältet, while field exercises were conducted at Herrhagen. In 1812, the exercises were moved to Varpnäs, but from 1831 they were moved to Trossnäs Field. The exercises were held at Höglunda in 1832–1836 and at Hagalund in 1832–1836. Trossnäs Field was also used for the soldiers’ exercises. In 1836, construction of the first barracks at Trossnäs began. Although the corps conducted weapons training at Trossnäs Field, the regiment's expedition remained in Karlstad.

The regiment's uniform in 1794

== Heraldry and Uniforms ==
=== Regimental Colours ===
In 1885, the corps was presented with its colours during a ceremony at Trossnäs Field. The colours were presented King Gustaf V in 1907. After the corps was disbanded, the colours were transferred to the corps' successor, Värmlands grenadjärregemente, as the corps' colours had been among those preserved. From 1 January 1928, the colours were carried by the 1st Battalion of the Göta Life Guards (I 2) until its disbandment on 25 September 1939.

=== Uniforms ===
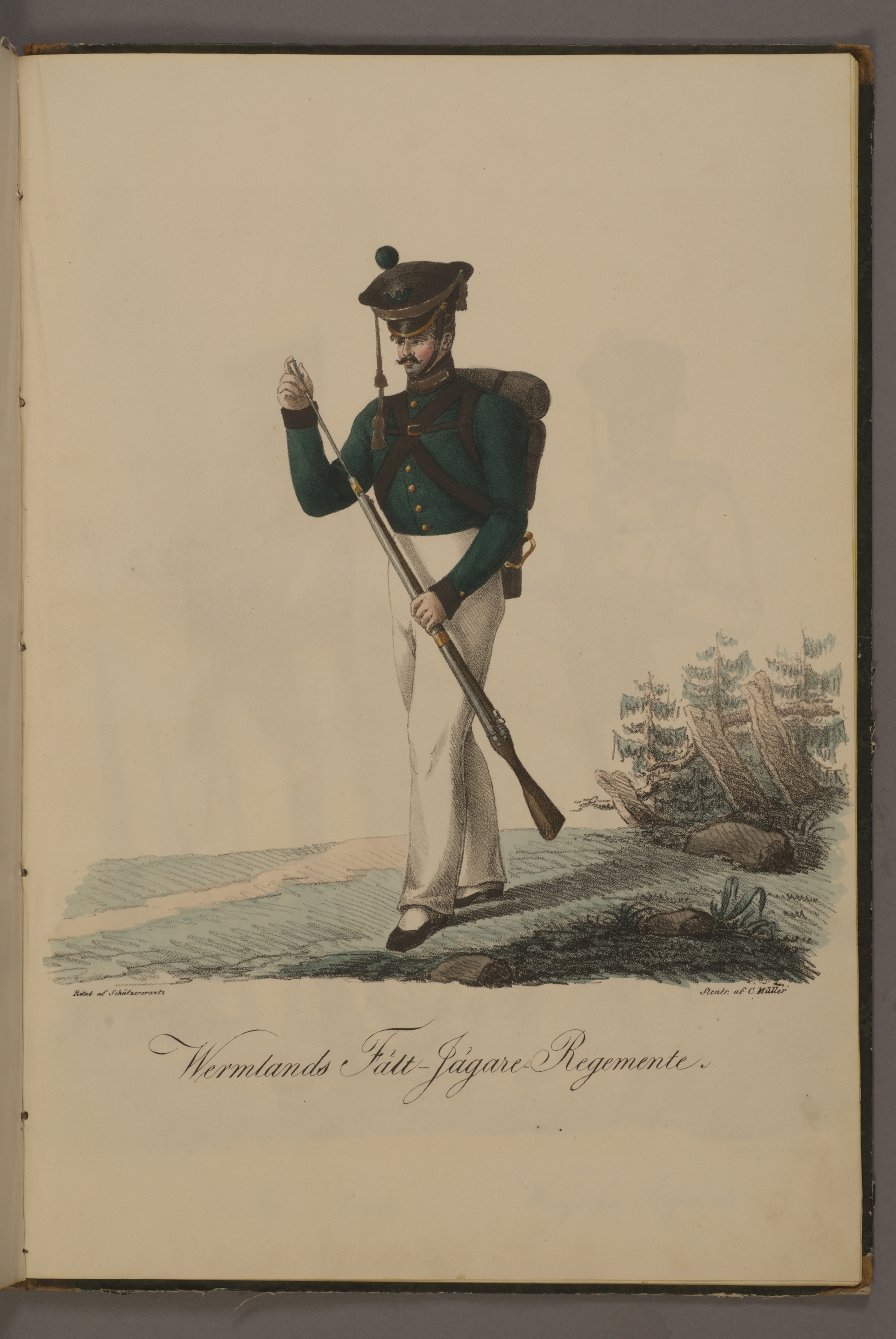
Uniform circa 1825.

Over the years, No. 26 had several uniforms used exclusively by the regiment, giving it a very distinctive uniform history compared with the rest of the army. Apart from the first uniform (m/1779), which was identical to that of the Närke-Värmland Regiment (red and blue), the regiment used green uniforms with black facings from the time it was established. In 1859, a uniform was introduced that was markedly influenced by the uniforms worn by Carabiniers. The uniform was distinguished by its yellow collar, a round hat with a horsehair plume, perhaps as a symbol of unity within the Swedish-Norwegian Union.

== See also ==
- List of Swedish infantry regiments
