= Småland Grenadier Corps =

- Smålands grenadjärkår
- Active: 1812–1901
- Country: Sweden
- Allegiance: Swedish Armed Forces
- Branch: Swedish Army
- Type: Infantry
- Size: Corps
- Part of: 2nd Military District (1833–1893); 2nd Army Division (1893–1901)
- Garrison/HQ: Ränneslätt
- Colors: Red and yellow
- March: "Finska rytteriets marsch" (unknown) (Note: The march was adopted circa 1895. It was also used by Småland Hussar Regiment from 1890 to 1927, and by the Norrbotten Regiment from 1916.)

Insignia
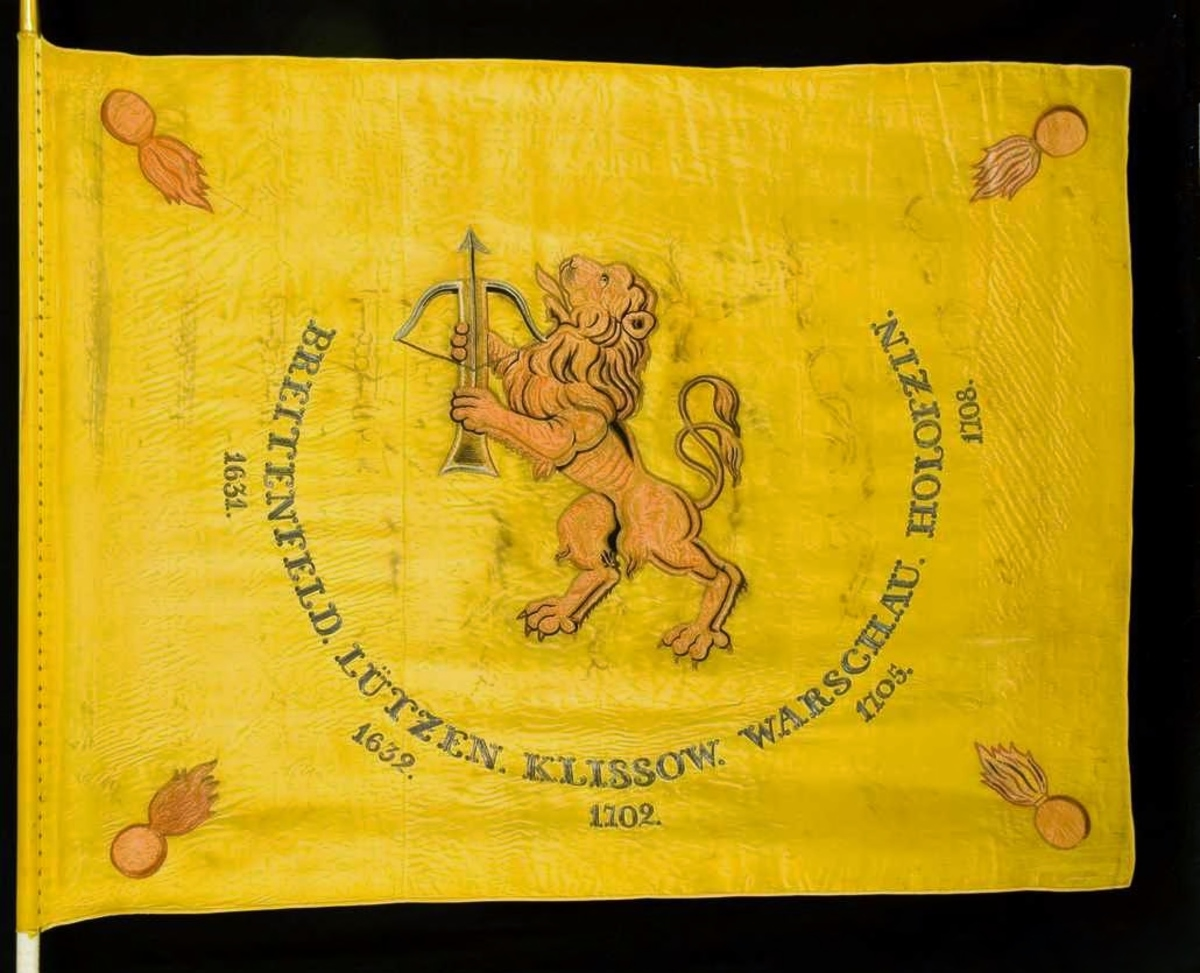
- Colour m/1844

Småland Grenadier Corps (Swedish: Smålands grenadjärkår), designated No. 7, was an infantry unit of the Swedish Army that was active in various forms from 1812 to 1901. The unit was based in Ränneslätt, about 2 km west of Eksjö.

== History ==
Småland Grenadier Corps has its origins in the Småland Dragoon Regiment, which on 22 April 1812 was split into an infantry and a cavalry part. In 1816, all Swedish regiments received a designation, where Småland Grenadier Corps was awarded No. 7. The unit adopted the name Småland Dragoon Regiment's Infantry Battalion, and changed its namn in 1824 to Småland Grenadier Battalion. On 27 October 1888, the name Småland Grenadier Corps was adopted.

According to the 1901 Defense Reform, the corps was disbanded as an independent unit on 31 December 1901. Instead it came together with Blekinge Battalion to form Karlskrona Grenadier Regiment on 1 January 1902.

== Units ==
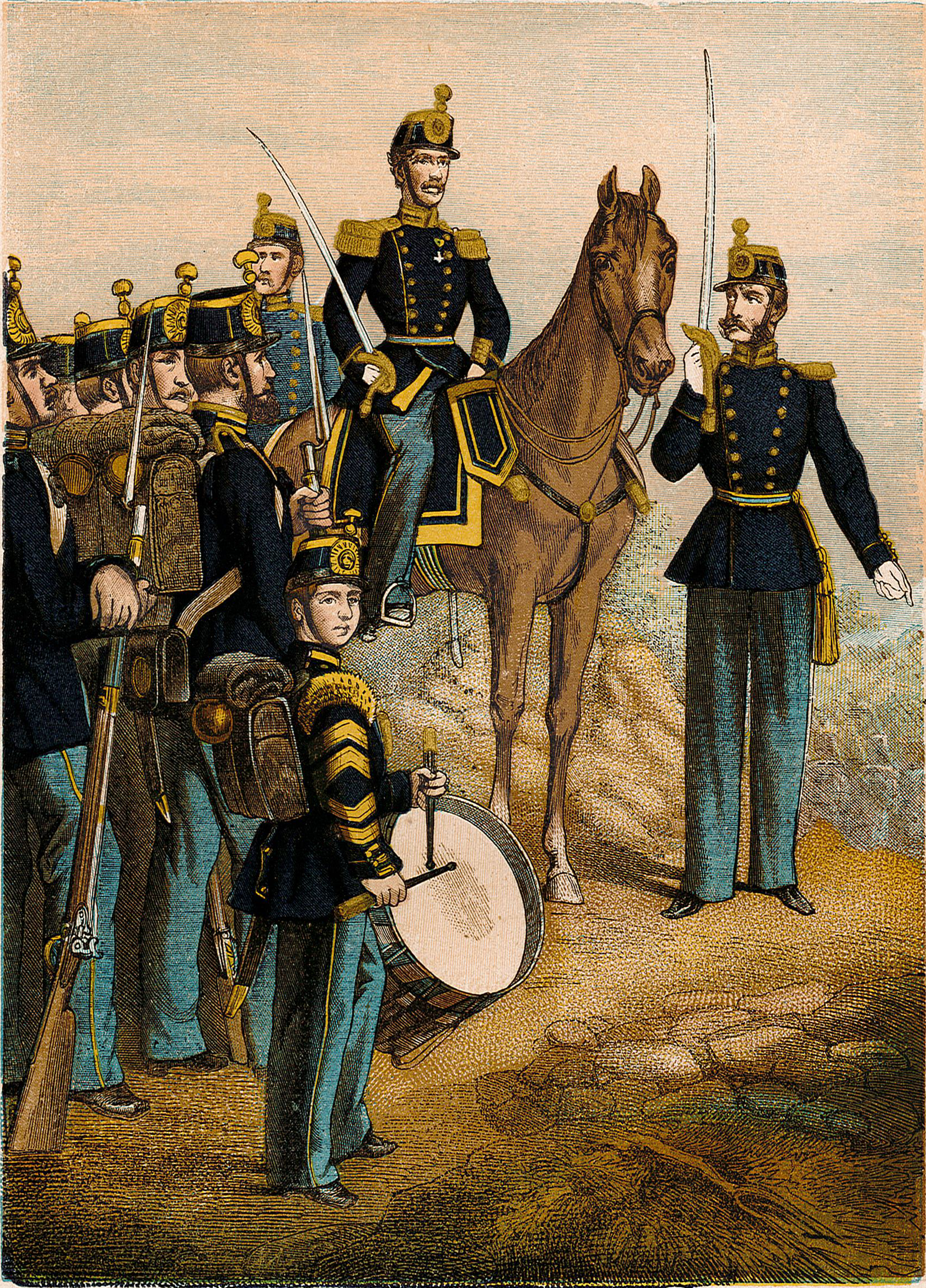
Uniforms of the Småland Grenadier Battalion (1866).

=== Companies ===
The unit was allotted in western Småland, but trained at Ränneslätt at Eksjö. The unit's four companies constituted the four squadrons of 125 rusthåll (literally "arm household" (Note: A bigger farm or estate (practically a peasant manor) that could support a horseman with his horse and equipment in exchange for tax exemption.)) each, which in 1812 were separated from the Småland Dragoon Regiment.

Name	Approximate subdivision area
1. Life company	Western Hundred (In the first years named Vrigstad Company.)
2. Eastern Hundred Company	Southern part of Eastern Hundred and some adjoining socken's
3. Sunnerbo Hundred Company	West half of Kronoberg County and the southernmost part of Östbo Hundred
4. Jönköping Company	West half of Jönköping County

== Barracks and training areas ==
Småland Grenadier Corps trained at Ränneslätt which is considered to be the Swedish military exercise site that has been in use for the longest time, from 1686 onwards.

== Names, designations and locations ==
Name	Translation	From		To
Kungl. Smålands dragonregementes infanteribataljon	Royal Småland Dragoon Regiment's Infantry Battalion	1812-04-22	–	1824-??-??
Kungl. Smålands grenadjärbataljon	Royal Småland Grenadier Battalion	1824-??-??	–	1888-10-26
Kungl. Smålands grenadjärkår	Royal Småland Grenadier Corps	1888-10-27	–	1901-12-31
Designation		From		To
No. 7		1816-10-14	–	1901-12-31
Location		From		To
Kvarnarps gård		18??-??-??	–	1834-??-??
Ränneslätt		1834-??-??	–	1901-12-31
