= Bremen Infantry Regiment (Sweden) =

- Bremiska infanteriregementet
- Active: 1690/1703–1715
- Allegiance: Sweden
- Branch: Swedish Army
- Type: Infantry
- Size: Regiment
- Engagements: Great Northern War

The Bremen Infantry Regiment (Swedish: Bremiska infanteriregementet), was a Swedish Army infantry regiment organised in Germany in the early 18th century.

== History ==
The regiment has its origins in Bidals kretsbataljon organised in 1682. That battalion then became was reformed as a regiment in either 1690 or 1703, and was made up of 1,128 men enlisted in Stade in Germany. In 1707 255 men were transferred to Pommerska infanteriregementet. Bremiska infanteriregementet was disbanded when Stralsund capitulated in 1715.

== Campaigns ==
- The Great Northern War (1700–1721)

== Organisation ==
- ?

== Name, designation and garrison ==
Name	Translation	From		To
Bremiska infanteriregementet	Bremen Infantry Regiment	1690/1703	–	1715

Designation	From		To
No designation		–	

Training ground or garrison town	From		To
No training ground		–	

== See also ==
- List of Swedish regiments
- Provinces of Sweden
