= Blekinge Battalion =

- Blekinge bataljon
- Active: 1887–1901
- Country: Sweden
- Allegiance: Swedish Armed Forces
- Branch: Swedish Army
- Type: Infantry
- Size: Battalion
- Part of: 2nd Military District (1887–1893); 2nd Army Division (1893–1901)
- Garrison/HQ: Ronneby
- March: "Donaugruss" (Král) (Note: The march was adopted in the late 1800s and was shared with the Värmland Rifle Corps (Värmlands fältjägarkår, I 26). The march is used by the Swedish Armed Forces Centre for Defence Medicine since 1998.)
- Battle honours: Hogland (1788), Svensksund (1789)

Insignia
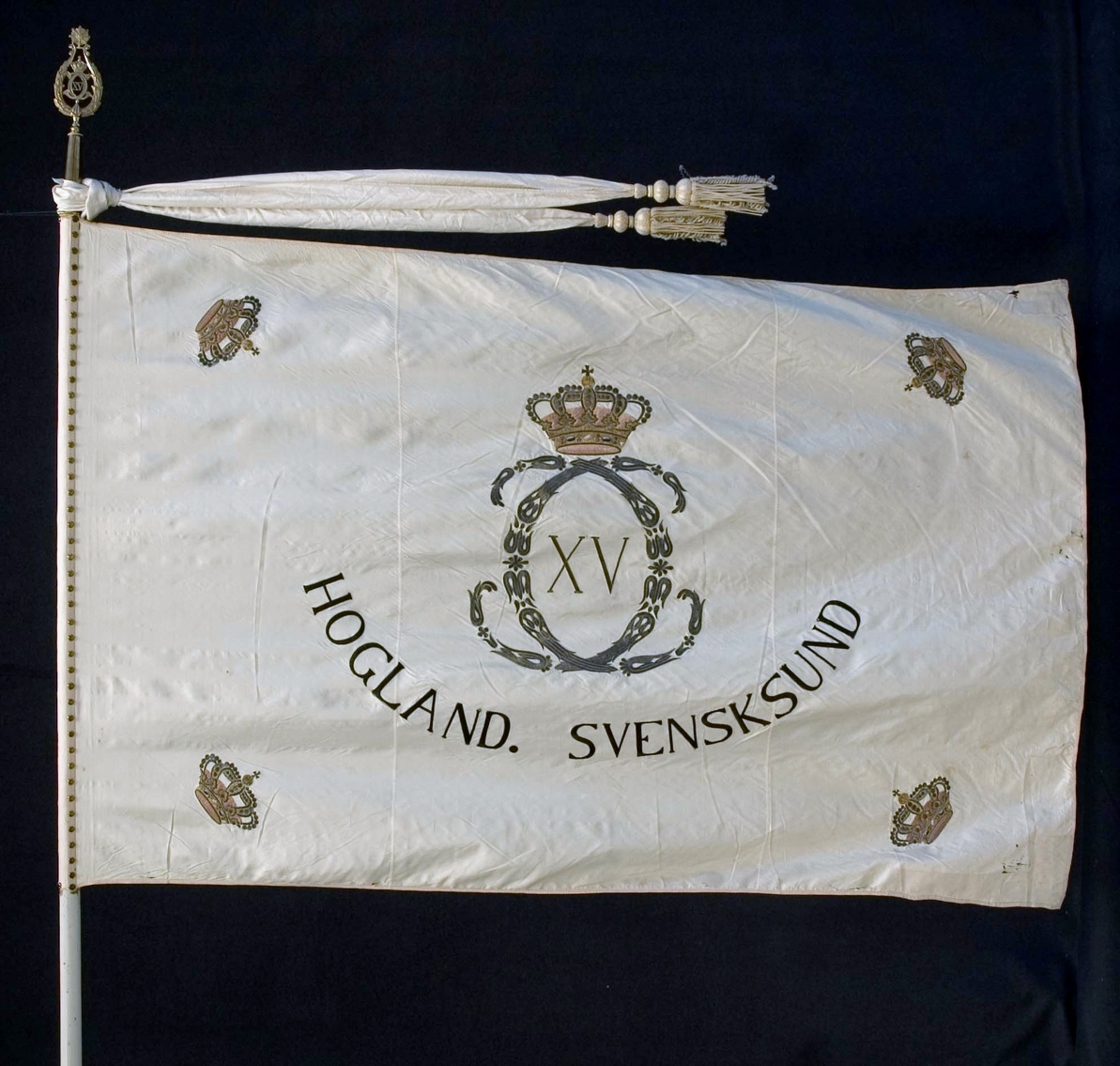
- Colour m/1867

Blekinge Battalion (Swedish: Blekinge bataljon), designated № 30, was an infantry unit of the Swedish Army that was active in various forms from 1887 to 1901. The unit was based in Ronneby.

== History ==
Blekinge Battalion was raised on 1 January 1887, to serve the conscripts of Blekinge County. Its officers were mainly taken from the disbanded Marine Regiment, and the force's strength was set at 300 men, which, in favor of Halland Battalion, was somewhat reduced according to the 1892 parliamentary decision. The battalion was based in Ronneby and trained at Bredåkra, at present Ronneby Airport.

According to the 1901 Defense Reform, the battalion was disbanded as an independent unit on 31 December 1901. Instead it came together with Småland Grenadier Corps (№ 7) to form Karlskrona Grenadier Regiment on 1 January 1902.

== Barracks and training areas ==
When the battalion was raised in 1887 it was transferred to Vämö plain and had its staff in Karlskrona. In 1888, the battalion came to be relocated to Bredåkra, and on 1 October 1891 the staff was placed to Ronneby. On 1 May 1890, the battalion's volunteer school was transferred to Bredåkra. After the battalion was disbanded, the battalion's camp at Bredåkra was brought into use by the Swedish Air Force, when Blekinge Wing (F 17) was formed in 1944 and was transferred to Bredåkra. Blekinge Battalion in Ronneby came to house Ågården's nursing home for mentally ill. In 1968 the building was demolished.

== Commanding officers ==
- 1889–1899: Major James Douglas Haasum
- 1900–1902: Major Curt Johan Elof Rosenblad

== Names, designations and locations ==
Name	Translation	From		To
Kungl. Blekinge bataljon	Royal Blekinge Battalion	1887-01-01	–	1901-12-31
Designation		From		To
№ 30		1887-01-01	–	1901-12-31
Location		From		To
Vämö		1887-??-??	–	1888-??-??
Ronneby		1891-10-01	–	1901-12-31
Bredåkra		1888-??-??	–	1901-12-31
