= Marine Regiment (Sweden) =

- Active: 1824–1886
- Allegiance: Swedish Armed Forces
- Branch: Swedish Navy (Note: From 1872 to 1886, the regiment belonged to the army and the infantry.)
- Type: Artillery
- Size: Regiment
- Garrison/HQ: Karlskrona
- Battle honours: Hogland, Svensksund

The Marine Regiment (Swedish: Marinregementet) was a naval artillery unit within the Swedish Navy that operated from 1824 to 1886. The unit was created in 1845 from the former Naval Artillery Regiment and was intended for garrison and guard duty at naval stations and fortifications, as well as for landing operations on ships. In 1871, the Marine Regiment was put on the list for disbandment but was revived again when it was transferred to the army as part of the Blekinge Battalion in 1886.

== History ==
The garrison troops in the Swedish Navy were known as mariners in earlier times, and there was a regiment of 1,400 men, which was reduced to 700 in 1766, some of whom were later enlisted as volunteers and others as boat crewmen. A new volunteer regiment of 400 men was established by letters patent on 4 March 1789, and another with 1,000 men, under the name of the Grand Admiral's Regiment (Storamiralens regemente), was established by letters patent on 13 May of the same year. After the end of the Russo-Swedish War, the regiments were merged into two, totaling 1,500 men, who performed garrison duty in Karlskrona; however, one company was stationed in Gothenburg, and later, one company was moved to Stralsund. A new company was established at the expense of the Swedish Pomeranian office. Finally, there were 2 regiments of volunteers in Karlskrona, 1 in Stockholm, and 1 in Gothenburg. According to a letters patent on 2 November 1824, these were transformed into the Naval Artillery Corps (Sjöartillerikåren) with 874 men in 10 companies, 7 of which were stationed in Karlskrona, 2 in Stockholm, and 1 in Gothenburg. The purpose of the Naval Artillery Corps in peacetime was to perform garrison duty at the navy's stations and engage in artillery work as needed. Its goal was to train good artillerymen, but it was also trained as both infantry and artillery.

According to a letters patent on 17 November 1832, the Naval Artillery Corps was transformed into the Naval Artillery Regiment (Sjöartilleriregementet) with 800 men in 10 companies, with roughly the same duties as the former corps, in addition to serving as the core of the Blekinge County militia. The regiment was garrisoned in Karlskrona, where the companies from Stockholm and Gothenburg were also transferred.

By letters patent on 28 November 1845, the Naval Artillery Regiment was reorganized into the Marine Regiment, with mainly the same regulations as the former. In 1872, with the beginning of that year, the Marine Regiment was transferred from naval to land defence and was to be gradually disbanded as personnel left. In the summer of 1886, there were 19 officers and 18 non-commissioned officers in service. Most of the quartered officers and non-commissioned officers from the Marine Regiment were transferred to the Blekinge Battalion, after which the regiment disappeared.

== Location ==
When the Naval Artillery Corps (Sjöartillerikåren) was reorganized into the Naval Artillery Regiment (Sjöartilleriregementet) and relocated to Karlskrona, the regiment was stationed at Sparre Barracks and conducted weapons training on Wämö Plain. In 1872, the Marine Regiment was transferred to the infantry on the list for disbandment but remained stationed at the same barracks. Sparre Barracks was handed over to the Navy in 1889.

== Commanding officers ==
- 1832–1856: Pehr Sparre
- 1856–1866: Carl Christian Kreüger
- 1866–1886: Carl Verner von Heidenstam

== Gallery ==
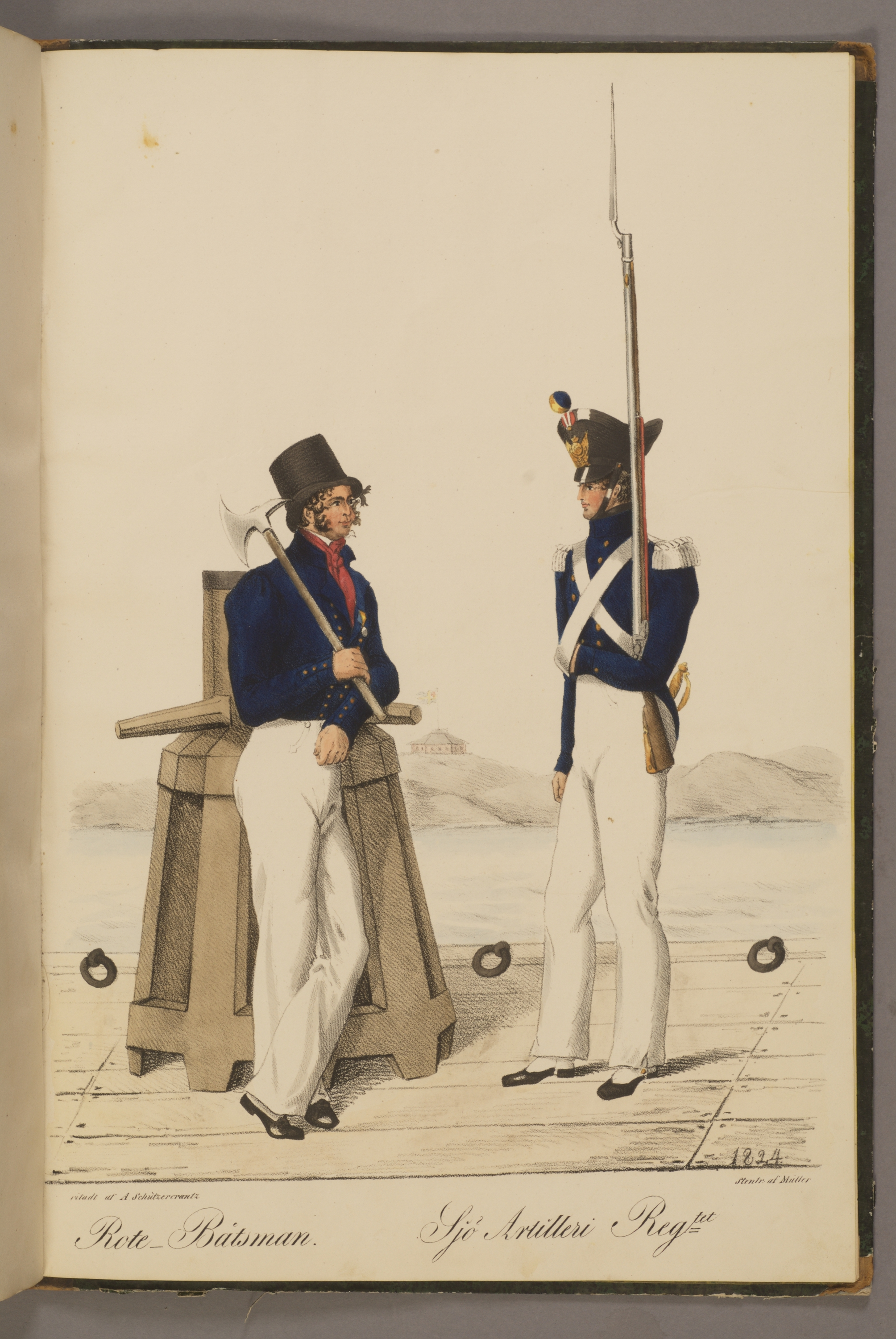
Uniforms for a soldier in the Naval Artillery Regiment (on the right) and a boatswain circa 1825

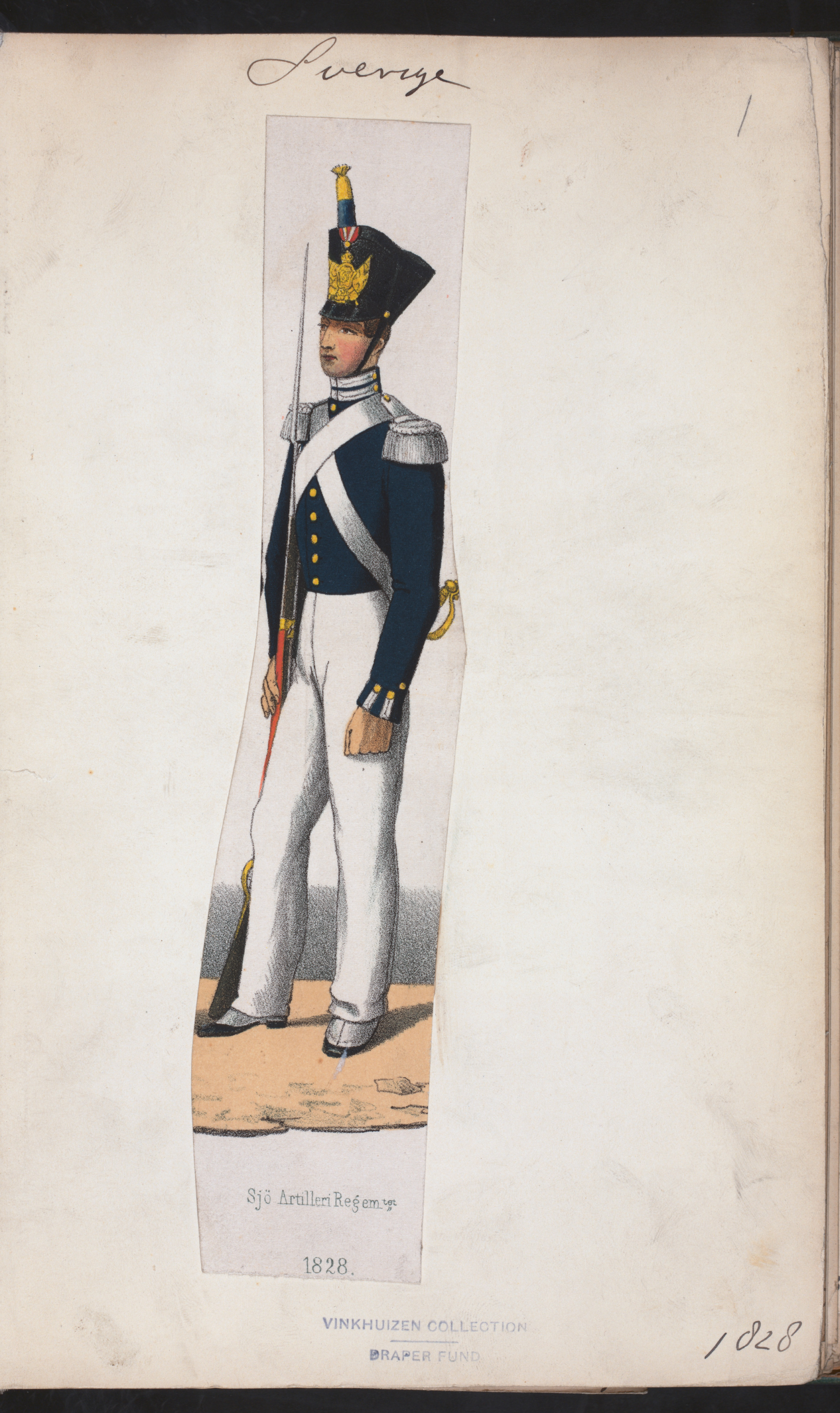
Uniform for the Naval Artillery Regiment 1828

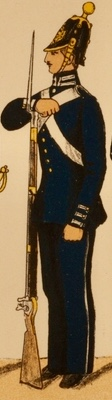
Uniform model 1845 for personnel at the regiment

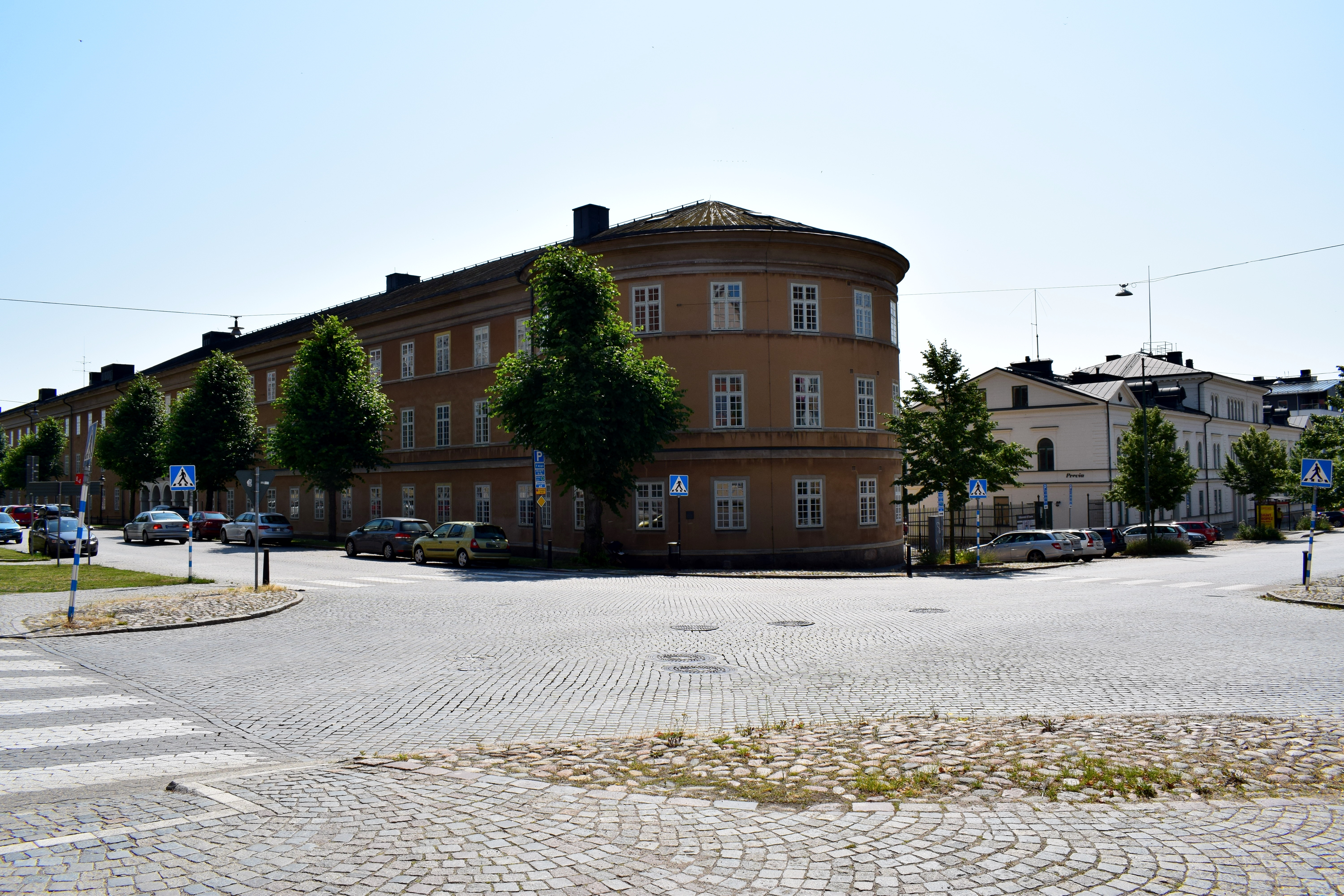
Sparre Barracks in Karlskrona

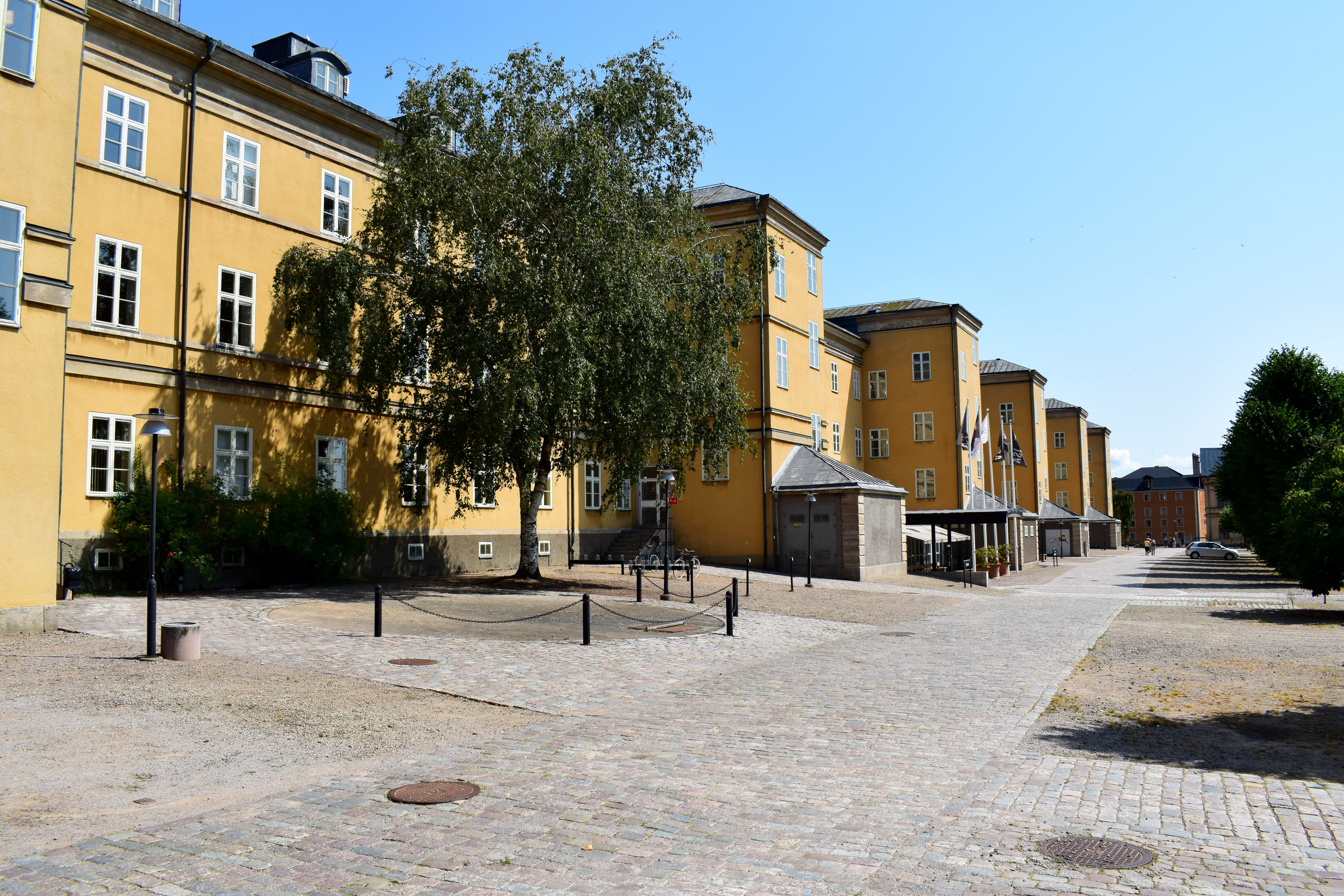
Sparre Barracks in Karlskrona

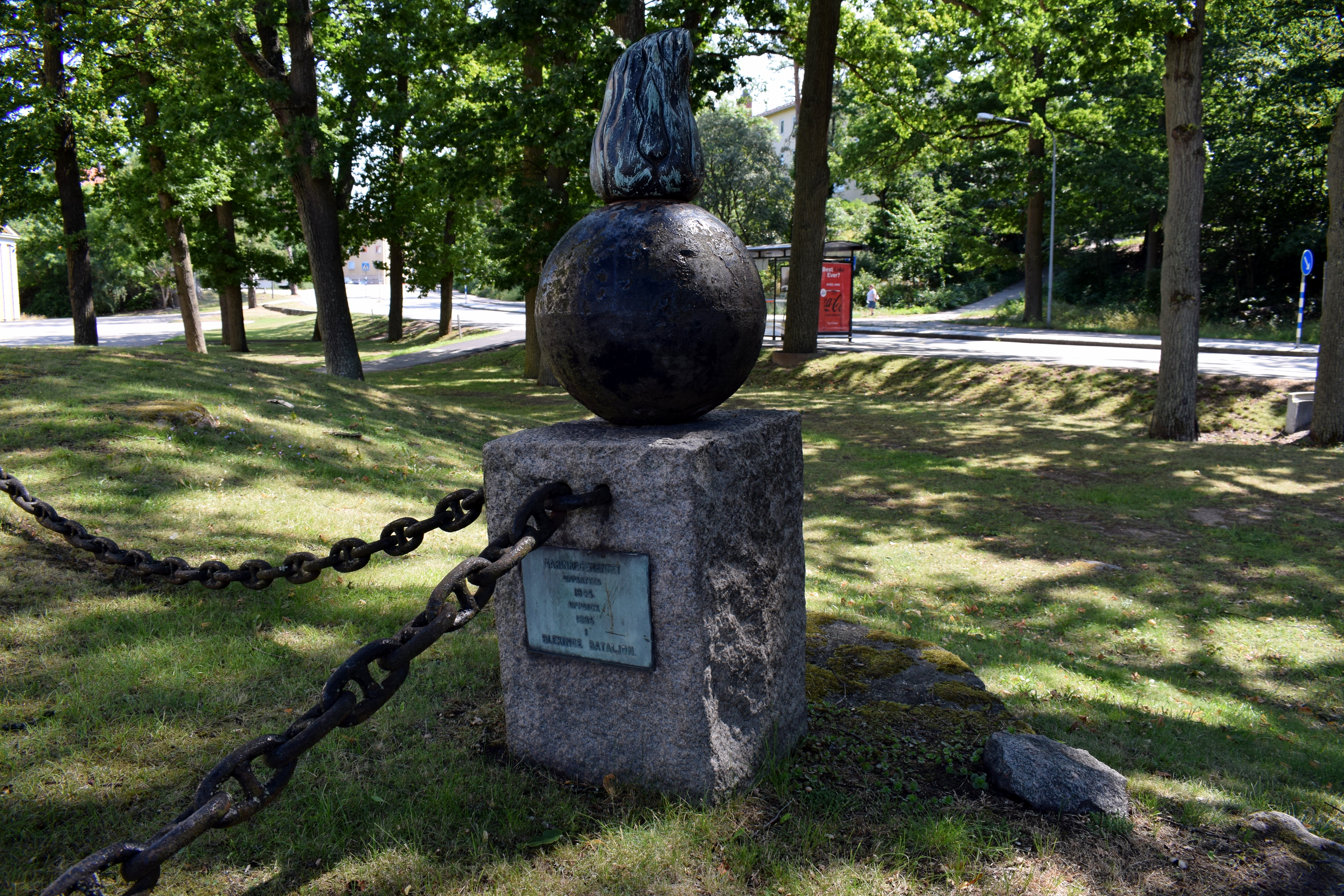
Memorial stone for the Marine Regiment erected in Gräsvik, Karlskrona

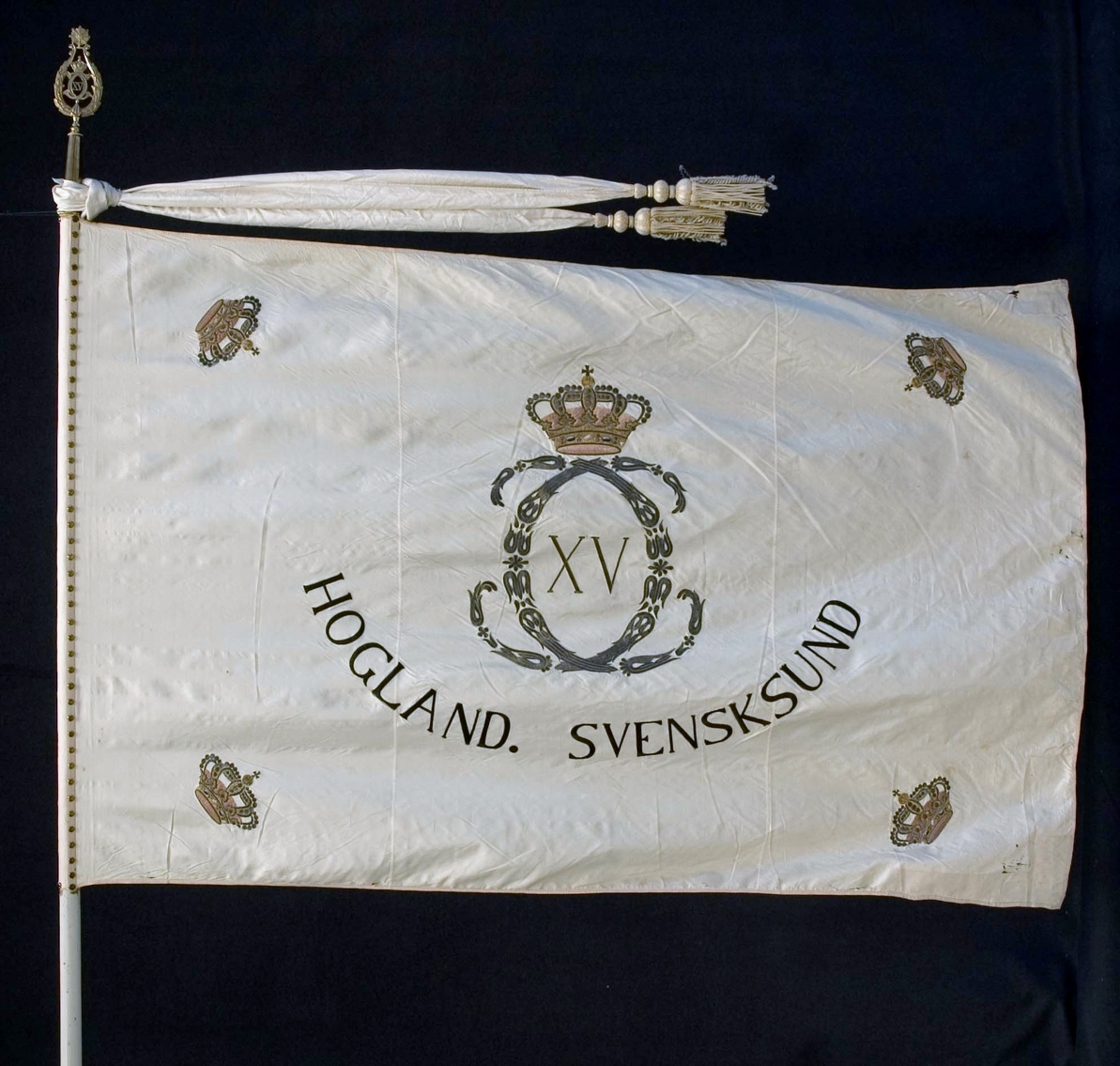
The flag of the Marine Regiment with the battle honour Hogland and Svensksund.
