= 1809 in Russia =

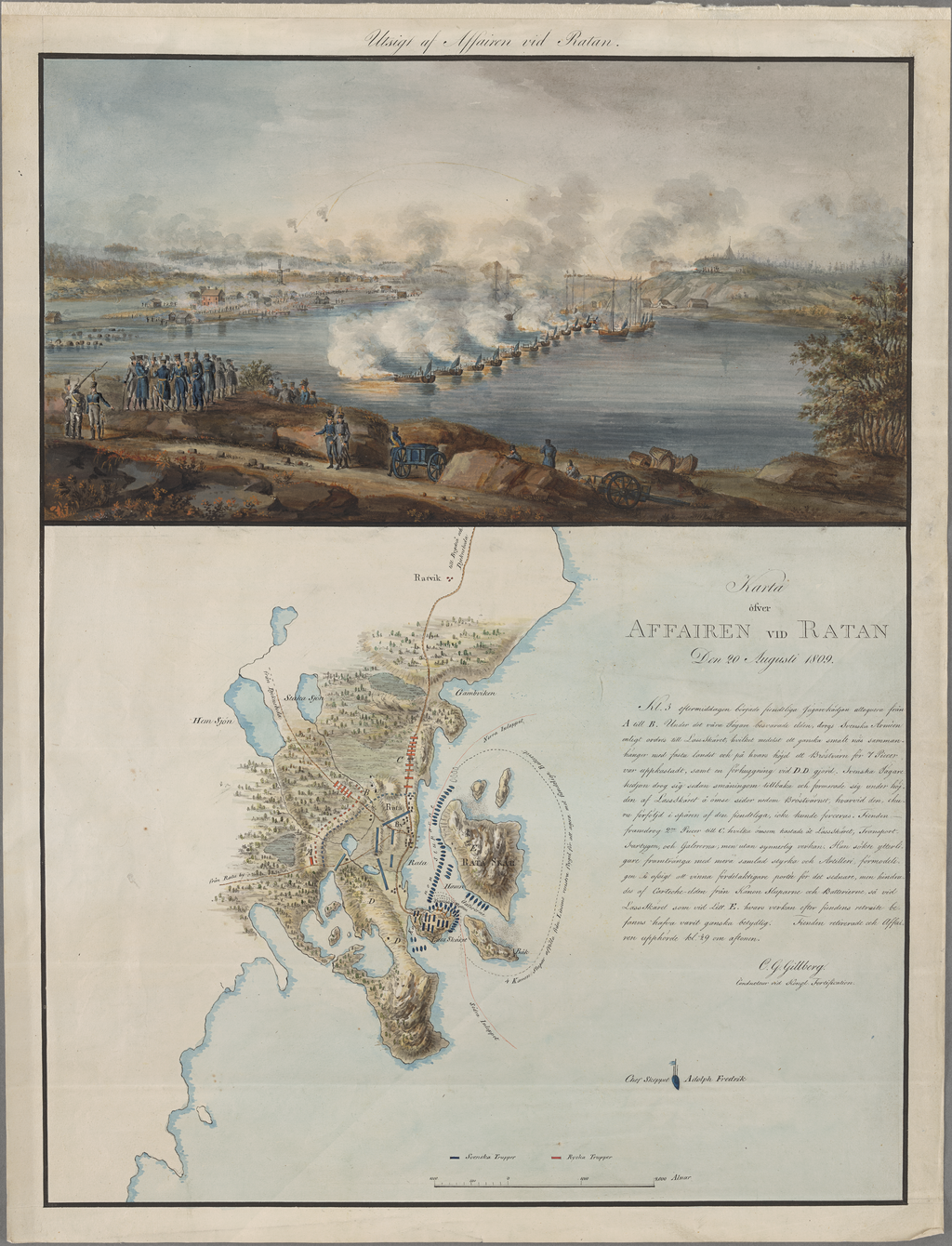
"View and Map of the Affair at Ratan, of August 20, 1809" by Carl Gustaf Gillberg, 1809

Events from the year 1809 in Russia.

== Incumbents ==
- Monarch – Alexander I

== Events ==
- Russo-Circassian War
  - November 7 - Raid on Kamennobrodskoye
- Russo-Persian War (1804–1813)
- Russo-Turkish War (1806–1812)
  - April 8 - September 4 - Campaign of Dobruja
    - April 20 - May 2 - Siege of Brăila
    - September 4 - Battle of Rassowa
  - October 21 - Battle of Tataritsa
- Anglo-Russian War (1807–1812)
- Finnish War (1808-1809)
  - March 10–21 - Åland Offensive
  - March 20–22 - Crossing the Gulf of Bothnia
  - March 25 - Capitulation of Kalix
  - May 15 - Battle of Skellefteå
  - July 5 - Battle of Hörnefors
  - August 19 - Battle of Sävar
  - August 20 - Battle of Ratan
  - August 25 - Battle of Piteå
  - September 17 - Treaty of Fredrikshamn - Sweden cedes Finland to Russia
- Chekhov Gymnasium founded
- Diet of Porvoo - May to July - Finnish legislative assembly establishes Russian-controlled Grand Duchy of Finland
- Church of the Transfiguration, Yekaterinburg consecrated
- Evangelical Lutheran Church of Finland separates from the Swedish Lutheran church
- Kagalnitskaya stanitsa founded
- Minister–Secretary of State for Finland - office established
- Russian Empire–United States relations - Russia and the United States establish official relations
- St. Petersburg State Transport University founded

== Births ==
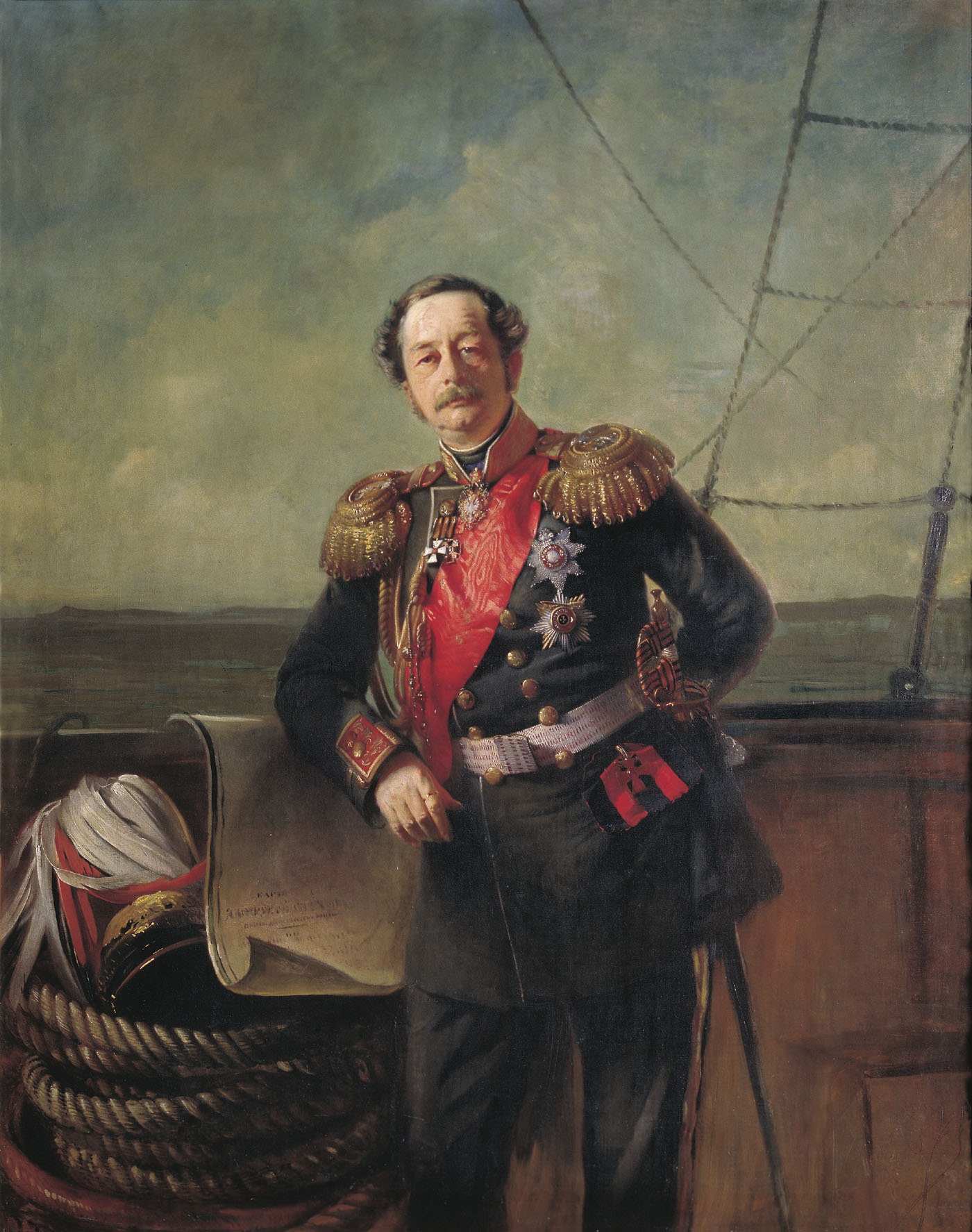
Konstantin Makovsky Nikolay-Muravyov-Amursky 1863

- Khachatur Abovian (disappeared 1848) - Armenian writer, scientist, educator, and modernizer
- Konstantin Mikhailovich Bazili (d. 1884) - historian and orientalist
- Nikolai Gogol (d. 1852) - Ukrainian-born writer and playwright
- Nikolai Ilyin (d. 1890) - founder of the apocalyptic Yehowist sect
- Aleksey Koltsov (d. 1842) - poet and folklorist
- Fyodor Koni (d. 1879) - dramatist, theatre critic, writer and editor
- Nestor Kukolnik (d. 1868) - playwright and writer of Rusyn origin
- Malbim (d. 1879) - rabbi and bible commentator, born in Volhynia in the Pale of Settlement
- Nikolay Motovilov (d. 1879) - biographer of Saint Seraphim of Sarov
- Nikolay Muravyov-Amursky (d. 1881) - general, statesman, pushed Russian expansion in Amur valley
- Nadezhda Repina (d. 1867) - actress and singer
- Javad khan Shirvanski (d. ?) - Azerbaijani noble and Russian general
- Alexandra Smirnova (d. 1882) - Imperial Russian lady-in-waiting and memoirist
- Feofil Tolstoy (d. 1881) - composer, music critic, and writer
- Vasily Zavoyko (d. 1898) - admiral, governor of Kamchatka

== Deaths ==
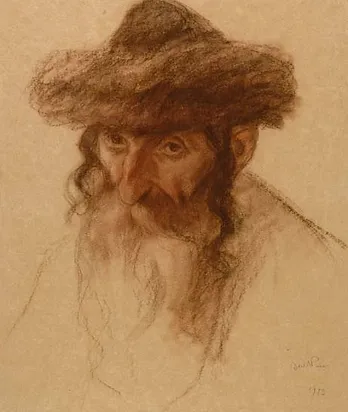
Levi Yitzchok of Berditchev

- Yakov Bulgakov (b. 1743) - diplomat
- Vasily Chichagov (b. 1726) - admiral and explorer
- Mikhail Kamensky (b. 1738) - general
- Heraclius Lisovsky (b. 1734) - Ruthenian Uniate bishop and church administrator
- Alexander Prozorovsky (b. 1733) - nobleman, general, and administrator
- Nikolai Sheremetev (b. 1751) - nobleman, administrator, actor, and theater owner
- Levi Yitzchok of Berditchev (b. 1740) - Hasidic rabbi and writer
