= Capitulation of Kalix =

1809 battle of the Finnish War

- Part of the Finnish War (Napoleonic Wars)
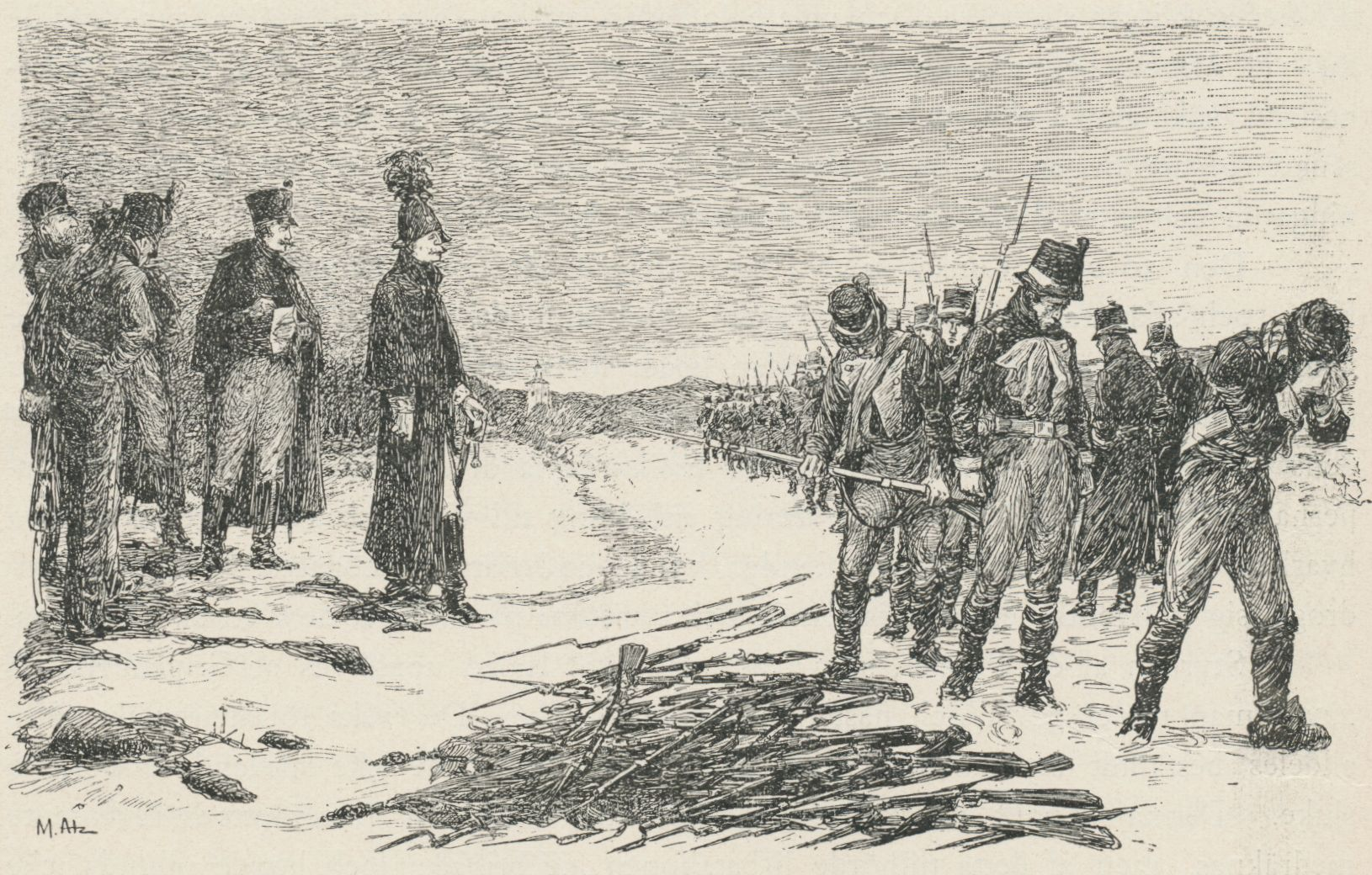
- Disarming of the Finns, Magnus Adlercreutz
Date	25 March 1809
Location	Kalix, Sweden 65°51′N 23°10′E
Result	Russian victory

Belligerents
Sweden	Russian Empire

Commanders and leaders
Hans Henrik Gripenberg (surrendered)	(Russian Empire) Pavel Andreyevich Shuvalov

Strength
3,800	6,000–9,000

Casualties and losses
3,800 surrendered (excluding an additional battalion that was not present at Kalix but surrendered according to the convention)	Insignificant

The Capitulation of Kalix took place during the Finnish War, on 25 March 1809, when 3,800–4,500 Swedish and Finnish troops under Hans Henrik Gripenberg surrendered to a much larger Russian army under Pavel Andreyevich Shuvalov, as part of a large Russian threefold attack against Sweden. The capitulation was characterised by the Swedish High Command as treacherous and Gripenberg was soon court-martialed.

== Background ==
After the Russian conquest of Finland, the Russian emperor Alexander I of Russia ordered a threefold attack on Sweden, to enforce a quick peace. The operation was launched in the midst of the Swedish revolution, in which the king Gustav IV Adolf was deposed. On 10 March 1809, a large Russian army under Gotthard Johann von Knorring moved against the Swedish forces stationed at Åland, in order to capture and use the islands for a continued offensive against Stockholm. Subsequently, another force of 3,700 men under Michael Andreas Barclay de Tolly went over Kvarken and forced the Swedish commander at Umeå, Major General Johan Adam Cronstedt to retreat, on 22 March. Barclay was, however, ordered to withdraw back to Sweden the next day, as a result of the Åland offensive and the following negotiations. Simultaneously, Pavel Andreyevich Shuvalov with a Russian corps of 9,000 men started moving against the northern Swedish border, at the Torne River, while pushing a Swedish force of 3,000 men under Hans Henrik Gripenberg before him. Gripenberg re-established a defensive position behind the Kalix River, with the intention of fighting a delaying action.

== Capitulation and aftermath ==
The Russian vanguard made contact with the Swedish rearguard at Sangis, however the fighting ended abruptly and the two sides parleyed. Gripenberg, who found his situation hopeless with the Russians moving on his flank, received a letter from Cronstedt, in which the retreating general overestimated the Russian force to 10,000–11,000 men; for this reason, as he incorrectly believed he would be cut-off from southern Sweden by a large Russian force, (Note: The Russian force at Umeå, which Cronstedt overestimated to almost three times the actual size, had already been ordered to withdraw back to Russia and started doing so on 27 March.) and as the Swedes were promised to be dismissed rather than kept as prisoners (on the condition that they withdrew from the war), he capitulated on March 25—in what would be known as the Convention of Säivis. Gripenberg's force was mostly made up of battle-hardened Finns who, as they marched through Tornio, surrendered their weapons at Kemi Church and wandered home, to Finland. The capitulation involved a total of about 7,075 men and all their provisions, (Note: Excluding the Västerbotten Regiment, the Karelian Dragoon Corps and a few personnel from the Archipelago fleet, as well as non-combatants and sick, numbering approximately 3,800 effective troops in total.) a number in which sick and non-combatants are included as well as troops not present at Kalix; as was the case with the Swedish Västerbotten Regiment, of which one battalion refused the capitulation terms and was instead captured at the Battle of Skellefteå.

At the time, the capitulation was deemed as an act of treachery—comparable to Carl Olof Cronstedt's surrender at Sveaborg—however, under the prevailing circumstances and with the information granted to him, the court-martialed Gripenberg was not solely to blame. The Russian threefold attack had nevertheless failed to achieve a quick desirable peace, for which reason Knorring lost his supreme command to Barclay. The war, which meant the end of Swedish rule over Finland, would continue until 17 September 1809.

=== Units included in the convention ===
- Nyland Dragoon Regiment: three squadrons surrendered.
- Karelian Dragoon Corps: none surrendered (not present at Kalix) (Note: Even though it was part of the force in the convention, it was not present and did not comply with the capitulation; it later fought at the Battle of Skellefteå.)
- Åbo Infantry Regiment: three battalions surrendered.
- Nyland Infantry Regiment: one battalion surrendered.
- Björneborg Infantry Regiment: three battalions surrendered.
- Österbotten Infantry Regiment: one battalion and one company surrendered.
- Tavastehus Infantry Regiment: two battalions and three companies surrendered.
- Nyland Jäger Battalion: three companies surrendered.
- Västerbotten Infantry Regiment: one out of the two battalions surrendered (not present at Kalix). (Note: The southern, or 2nd battalion, did not comply with the capitulation; it later fought at the Battle of Skellefteå.)
- Finnish and Swedish land and sea artillery: 10 guns
- Savolax Artillery Regiment
- Archipelago fleet

== Notes, citations and sources ==
=== Sources ===
- Generalstaben, Krigshistoriska avdelningen (1921). Sveriges krig åren 1808 och 1809, Volume 8; issue 2 (in Swedish). Stockholm: Kongl. boktryckeriet P. A. Norstedt & söner.
- Hornborg, Eirik (1955). När riket sprängdes: fälttågen i Finland och Västerbotten, 1808-1809 (in Swedish). Stockholm: P. A. Norstedts och Söners Förlag.
