= Blagovest (disambiguation) =

Blagovest may refer to:

- Blagovest (name), a Bulgarian first name
- Blagovest, a type of peal in Russian Orthodox bell ringing.
- Blagovest (news agency), Russia
- Blagovest (real estate), one of the top real estate agencies in Kyiv, Ukraine
- Blagovest (satellite), a family of Russian communication satellites
- Blagovest, a book of teaching of Nikolai Ilyin, founder a Russian Yehowist religious movement
- Blagovest, a journal published by Vladimir Purishkevich
