= Battle of Skellefteå =

1809 battle of the Finnish War

- Part of the Finnish War (Napoleonic Wars)
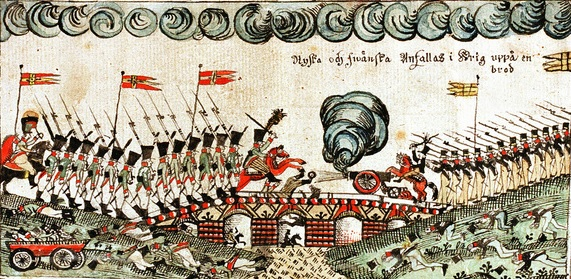
- Ryska och Swänska Anfallas i Krig uppå en brod, by Lars Larsson (1784–1840); the painting [most likely] portrays the fighting at the Lejonström Bridge.
Date	15 May 1809
Location	Skellefteå, Sweden 64°45′N 20°57′E
Result	Russian victory

Belligerents
Sweden	Russian Empire

Commanders and leaders
Johan Henrik Furumark	(Russian Empire) Pavel Andreyevich Shuvalov

Strength
700	6,000

Casualties and losses
650	Unknown

The Battle of Skellefteå took place during the Finnish War, on 15 May 1809, when 6,000 Russians under Pavel Andreyevich Shuvalov attacked 700 Swedes under Johan Henrik Furumark, at Skellefteå, Sweden. The Swedes, who fought a delaying action to buy time for their provisions to be escorted to safety, were captured as the Russians flanked around and cut-off their way of retreat. Most provisions, however, were saved.

== Background ==
In the aftermath of the Swedish revolution and the Russian attacks on Åland and northern Sweden, in March, the fighting between the two sides ceased, in favor of the ongoing peace negotiations. Sweden, being aware of the impossibility of liberating Finland from Russian occupation, was determined to at least improve the peace conditions; as demanded by Alexander I of Russia, the border between Sweden and Russian-Finland was to be established at the Kalix River. On 30 April, Pavel Andreyevich Shuvalov with more than 9,000 men started moving south, in order to occupy northern Sweden all the way to the Ume River. Commander in Chief Fabian Wrede had almost 5,000 men, albeit largely scattered around northern Sweden, ready to receive them. The Russians suffered from insufficient provisions and, since the Swedish countryside would provide little in terms of provisions, they marched towards the Swedish magazines stored at Skellefteå.

== Battle ==
Johan Henrik Furumark with 700 men were ordered by Johan Adam Cronstedt, the commander of the forces around Umeå, to delay the Russians until the Swedish magazines had been brought out from the city. Before his arrival, Shuvalov split his forces in two; about 3,300 men were to frontally engage the Swedes behind the frozen Skellefte River, while 2,650 men committed to a flanking maneuver to cut-off their retreat. The Russians arrived on 15 May and immediately engaged the opposing force, but the soldiers out of the Västerbotten Regiment stood their ground well, as they received the first onslaught. Upon realizing that he was being encircled, and that a continued defence would be pointless, the Swedish general ordered a retreat.

The Swedish outposts became hardly pressed as they retreated and, to stop the Russians from bringing up artillery, 20 Västerbotten men were ordered to destroy the Lejonström Bridge, under enemy fire. The Russians soon crossed the river and captured the Swedish gun covering the work, but were thrown back as the Swedes counter-attacked, after which the retreat proceeded under intense Russian pressure. The Swedish baggage train which had been sent south ahead of the battle, without escort, was soon captured at Yttervik by the flanking Russian column. Furumark, who retreated with his forces along the coastline, realized that he was completely cut-off by the much larger force at Yttervik and subsequently agreed to surrender.

=== Swedish units ===
- Västerbotten Regiment: 1 battalion
- Vasa Field-Battalion (Vasa, Uleåborg and Kajana): 3 companies
- Karelian Dragoon Corps
- Savolax Artillery Regiment (Savolax Brigade)
- Saimaa Fleet

== Aftermath ==
All but a few Swedes were captured and, according to some sources, 130 had been either killed or wounded; about 40 men had managed to flee through the woods. Lack of provisions restricted Shuvalov from immediately following up his victory and to march towards Umeå and the Swedish provisions stored there; these were instead brought to safety by General Georg Carl von Döbeln who had replaced Cronstedt as the commander of the forces around Umeå. Döbeln was in-turn replaced by Johan August Sandels on 7 June, for health reasons. The Russians took Umeå on 1 June, after which their offensive stalled; instead it was the Swedes under Sandel who went on a counter-offensive and fought the Russians at the Battle of Hörnefors.

== Citations and sources ==
=== Sources ===
- Generalstaben, Krigshistoriska avdelningen (1922). Sveriges krig åren 1808 och 1809, Volume 9 (in Swedish). Stockholm: Kongl. boktryckeriet P. A. Norstedt & söner.
- Hornborg, Eirik (1955). När riket sprängdes: fälttågen i Finland och Västerbotten, 1808-1809 (in Swedish). Stockholm: P. A. Norstedts och Söners Förlag.
