= Nikolai Ilyin =

Nikolai Ilyin (Russian: Николай Ильин) may refer to:

- Nikolai Ilyin (sniper) (1922-1943), Soviet World War II sniper
- Nikolai Ilyin (Yehowist) (1809-1890), founder of an apocalyptic millenarian movement of the Yehowists
