= Siege of Sveaborg =

1808 battle of the Finnish War

Coordinates: 60.1472°N 24.9872°E

- Part of the Finnish War
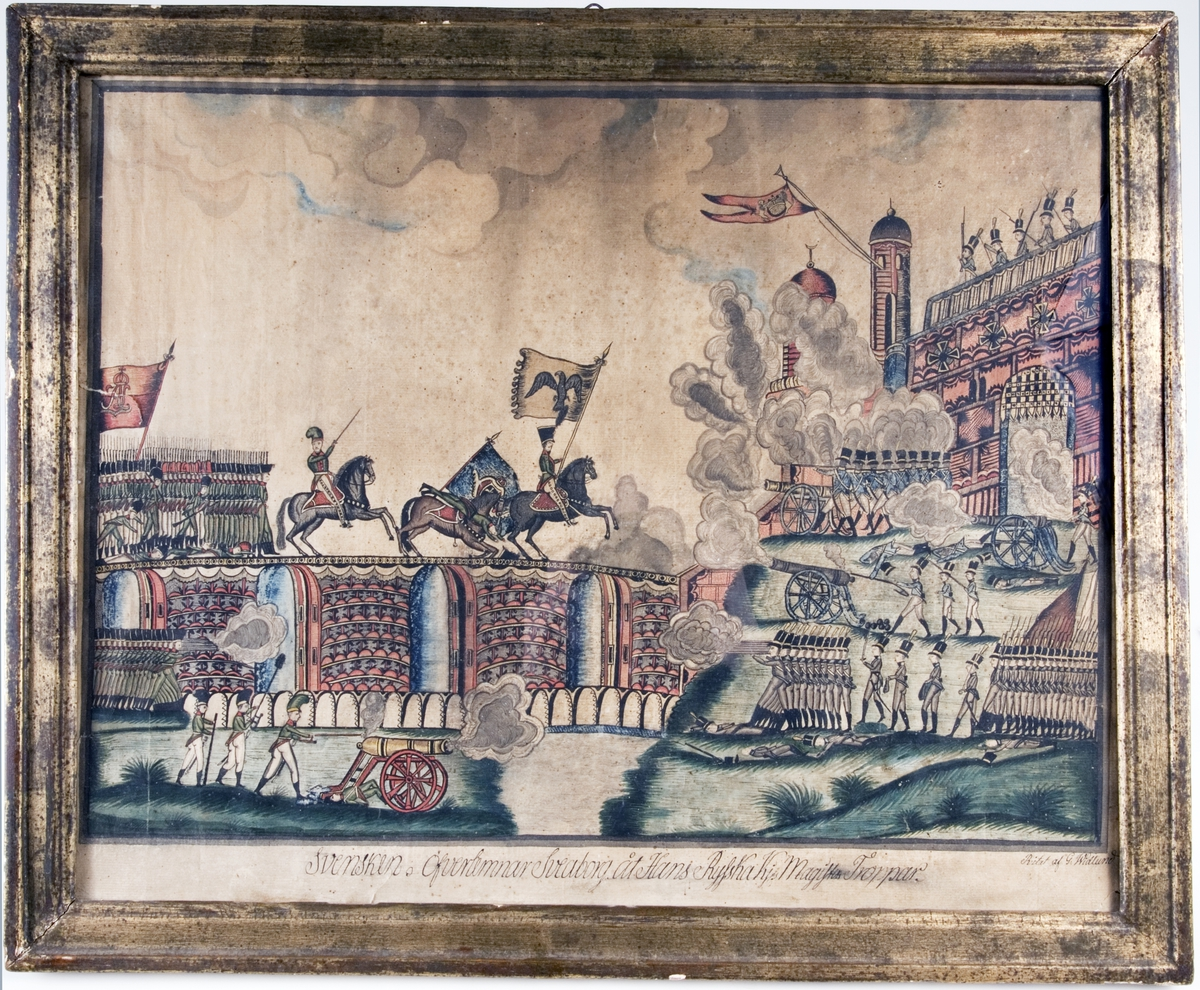
- Sveaborg surrenders to the Russians
| Date | 14 March [O.S. 2 March] 1808 – 3 May [O.S. 21 April] 1808 |
| Location | Sveaborg, Swedish Finland |
| Result | Russian victory |

Belligerents
| (Russian Empire) Russia | Sweden |

Commanders and leaders
| (Russian Empire) Fyodor Fyodorovich Buksgevden (Russian Empire) Pieter van Suchtelen | Carl Olof Cronstedt (surrendered) |

Strength
| 6,500 men, 59 cannons | 7,500+ men, 94–110 ships |

Casualties and losses
| Unknown | 6 dead, 32 wounded Capitulation: 7,500 captured, 58 guns captured, whole fleet captured |

The siege of Sveaborg was a siege by Imperial Russian forces of the sea fort of Sveaborg (Finnish: Suomenlinna), off the coast of Helsingfors (Helsinki); at the time Finland was part of the Kingdom of Sweden. It took place in the spring of 1808, during the Finnish War. Despite its formidable reputation as "the Gibraltar of the North", the fortress surrendered after a siege of two months. As its capitulation was followed by the rapid collapse of Swedish resistance elsewhere, and ultimately the Russian conquest of Finland, the siege is often regarded as the decisive battle of the war.

== Preparations ==
A week before the war began, Sveaborg's commander Admiral Carl Olof Cronstedt received a letter from the King Gustav IV Adolf which required him to fit for operations and acquire crews for two hemmema-type archipelago frigates and over 70 smaller gunboats or yawls. Additionally, the letter demanded that the fortress of Sveaborg must be defended to the bitter end and should withdrawing from the fortress be necessary then the bulk of the coastal fleet which had been docked at the fortress for the winter as well as all the supplies had to be destroyed by burning them down.

== The siege ==
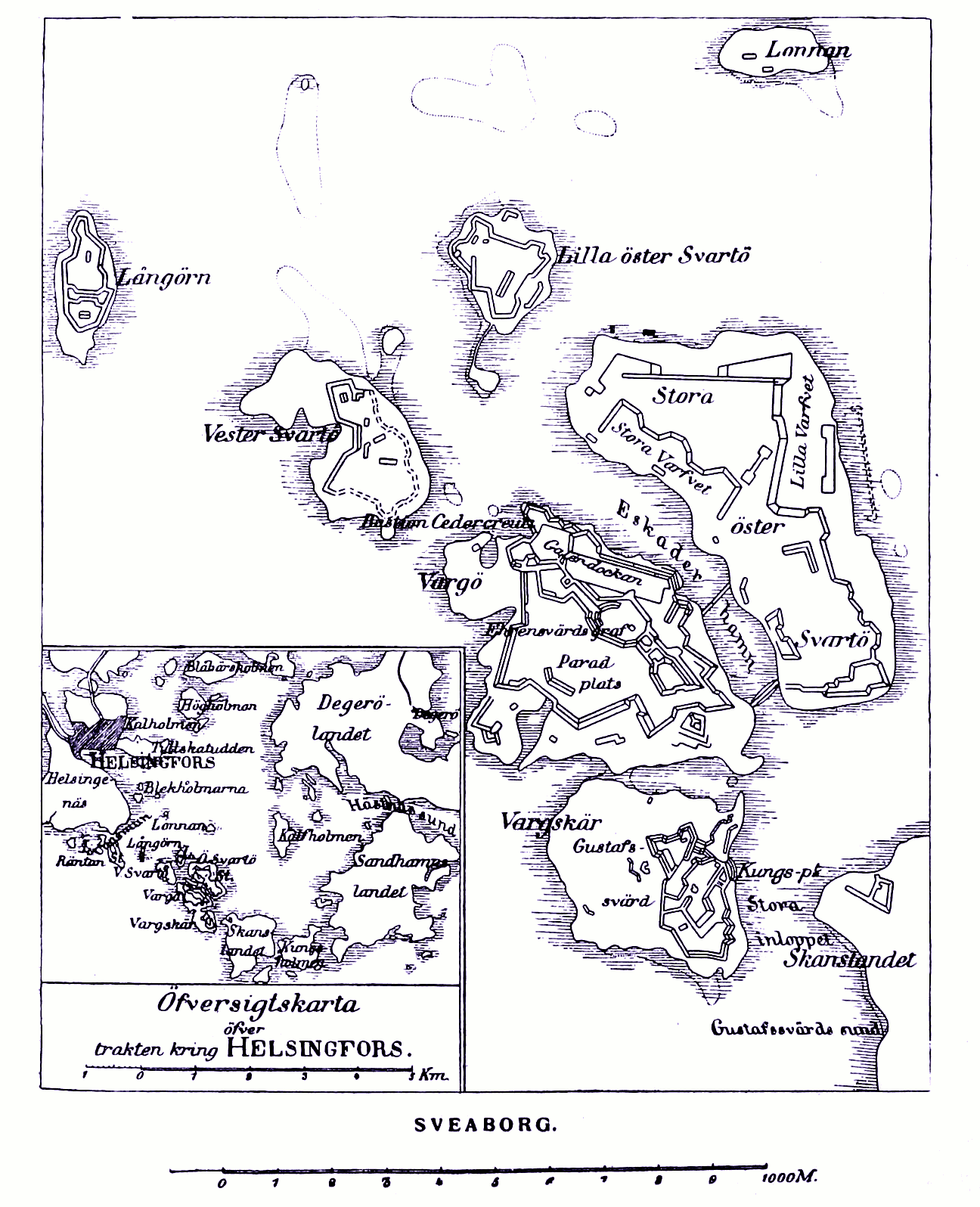

Russian forces under Friedrich Wilhelm von Buxhoeveden laid siege to Sveaborg after the fall of Helsingfors on 2 March 1808. However, the Russian force which had captured Helsingfors consisted only of roughly 2,000 men, who had no actual chance even to harass the fortress. Only in mid-March had the Russians concentrated 4,000 men in the area, under General Jan Pieter van Suchtelen, who started a more effective siege of Sveaborg, first by establishing siege artillery batteries. By early April Russians had amassed 6,500 men and 59 artillery pieces, some of which had been taken from Svartholm fortress after it surrendered, to besiege Sveaborg.

Defenders at Sveaborg often fired at the Russian cossack patrols on the ice around the fortress, but without any practical results. Instead of attacking the numerically inferior besieger, the Swedes were content to stay behind their fortifications and prepare for the Russian assault by sawing a ditch to the open the ice around the fortress. The first Russian barrages were fired on 19 March and continued until 21 March, after which first attempts to negotiate were made. Cronstedt agreed not to fire at the town of Helsingfors in exchange for the Russians keeping their artillery batteries away from that direction. This suited the Russians since it allowed them to lodge their troops in Helsingfors without danger of being shot at by the Swedish artillery.

On 23 March Cronstedt parleyed with Russian representatives on the island Lonnan, where Russians demanded the surrender of the fortress. After the Swedish refusal to comply, the Russians started another barrage against the fortress on 25 March which lasted until 1 April. The Russian surrender demand was repeated on 2 April. The Russians resorted to cunning psychological warfare to convince the officers in the fortress to surrender. Former Swedish subject Johan Samuel Hagelström received special commendation from the Tsar for his actions in getting Sveaborg to surrender. Certain officers' wives who lived in Helsingfors and were allowed and encouraged by the Russians to visit the husbands in Sveaborg also played their parts. Perhaps the most important person in the Russian efforts to use cunning to force a surrender was the trusted advisor of Cronstedt, Colonel Fredrik Adolf Jägerhorn.

In the negotiations that continued on 2 April, Cronstedt suggested a truce at least until 13 May 1808. The Russians responded positively but demanded that the truce last only until 3 May and that meanwhile they would occupy several of the fortified small islands around the main fortress of Sveaborg. Discussing the matter with his officers, Cronstedt noted that according to his reckoning, the fortress had only enough ammunition left for two weeks and that men were getting sick. When asked about the fleet, Cronstedt refused to torch it, stating that it would be a disaster if the fortress survived and there were no fleet left.

On 6 April Cronstedt agreed with Jan Pieter van Suchtelen, the Russian commander in Helsinki, on an honourable capitulation on 3 May if Swedish reinforcements didn't reach Sveaborg by then. The Swedish couriers bearing the requests for reinforcements were delayed by the Russians and didn't reach Stockholm until 3 May, the day Cronstedt capitulated and surrendered the fortress to the Russians, along with 7,500 soldiers and a fleet of 94 ships. Even if the couriers had arrived earlier, Sveaborg probably could not have been relieved by the fleet, as the winter was unusually cold and the Baltic Sea was still partially frozen at the time. The fortress lost 6 men dead and 32 wounded as well as a couple of broken roofs and windows as the result of Russian actions in the siege.

== Aftermath ==
The capture of Sveaborg was a major flip for the Russian campaign in Finland, as it removed the threat of a counterattack from the south and west. To Sweden it was a devastating blow as it made the resupply of the battered Finnish army much more difficult. Among other things, Russia captured the bulk of the Swedish archipelago fleet. This included 3 hemmema and 7 turuma type archipelago frigates, 25 gun sloops, 51 gun yawls and various other ships. This had an immense effect on the war in the Finnish archipelago, especially since the chance of the Russian battle fleet successfully engaging the joint Swedish and British battle fleets in the open sea was marginal. Before the Russians were able to deploy their newly-captured fleet, an explosion happened at Sveaborg on 3 June 1808 which, together with the fire that broke out afterwards, caused considerable damage to the ships at Sveaborg, destroying among other things six of the seven captured turuma type archipelago frigates.

The Russians won a series of further victories over the Swedes during the summer, and by the autumn they had managed to overrun the entirety of Finland. In spring 1809 they then conquered the Åland Islands too and threatened Stockholm itself, and Sweden was consequently forced to make peace under the Treaty of Fredrikshamn, by which both Finland and Åland were ceded to the Russian Empire. As Sveaborg had long been regarded as the strongest fortress in Finland, and as Swedish resistance collapsed relatively quickly after its fall, the siege there soon came to be seen as having been the decisive engagement of the war.

Moreover, the fact that Sveaborg had capitulated after a siege of just two months, despite its formidable reputation, led to suspicions of cowardice or even outright treason being levelled against Cronstedt, and he was soon singled out as the chief scapegoat for the Swedish defeat. He wisely chose to stay in Finland after being released from Russian captivity, but he was nevertheless tried for treason in Sweden, found guilty and condemned to death in absentia. It was somewhat ironic that it was Cronstedt who ended up being vilified as the man who supposedly betrayed Finland to the Russians, given that he had prior to the Finnish War been a great hero for his victory over the Russian navy at the Second Battle of Svensksund, during the earlier Russo-Swedish War (1788–1790).

=== Controversies surrounding the capitulation ===
As a result of the official condemnation of Cronstedt as a traitor, and the psychological need to find a scapegoat for the disastrous defeat in the Finnish War, most Swedes soon came to accept the idea that he was bribed to surrender Sveaborg. The bribery explanation has remained the dominant one in popular history ever since, and is still widely believed by many Swedes and Finns today. However, subsequent generations of historians have questioned this notion, for while it appears that Cronstedt's deputy commander did take money from the Russians, no positive evidence has ever surfaced of bribes being paid to Cronstedt himself. It is certainly true that after the war he was awarded a pension by the Russian state, but such pensions were granted to all the military officers who elected to stay in Finland and thereby forfeited their Swedish pensions, and his was no larger than those paid to other officers of his rank. Moreover, due to bureaucratic issues he did not actually start receiving any money until several years later, and his lifestyle in retirement was notably humble.

Indeed, historians have identified a number of reasons to justify, or at least explain, Cronstedt's decision to surrender the fortress when he did, pointing out that Sveaborg was not actually the impregnable "Gibraltar of the North" that it was widely believed to be at the time, and deducing a number of factors that might have led Cronstedt to overestimate the Russians' strength or have otherwise affected his thinking. The questions as to whether Sveaborg could potentially have continued resisting for longer, and whether Cronstedt was "right" to surrender, are open ones and are still debated in Finnish and Swedish historiography to this day.

The following are some of the observations that have been made in these discussions:

- The main reason given by Cronstedt himself for his decision to surrender was that the fortress was about to run out of gunpowder. However, the validity of this explanation has been disputed by subsequent historians, who have argued that he could have eked out his supplies for several weeks longer if he reduced the number of guns in use (as opposed to keeping all of them in action as he had up to that point), and have also blamed him for needlessly squandering his powder reserves early in the siege by allowing the guns to be fired at night even though their chances of hitting their targets in the darkness were small.
- The sea was still frozen, and ships of the British Royal Navy, Sweden's ally, therefore could not approach the fortress to support it.
- The messengers sent to Stockholm to request reinforcements were delayed by the Russians and arrived too late.
- Even if the messengers had arrived in time, it is questionable if the authorities could have scraped together enough troops to send reinforcements anyway, as almost all the Swedish forces not already engaged in Finland were needed elsewhere to face Denmark-Norway and France in the concurrent Dano-Swedish War of 1808-1809 and Franco-Swedish War respectively.
- Sveaborg is a bastion fortress, built on principles applied in Europe. This architectural type was considered as the world's most modern in those days. However, bastion fortresses were normally built in central Europe, where the land is flat. As the Finnish archipelago isn't flat at all (the height changes are huge) Sveaborg fit the location poorly. As the architecture of a bastion fortress relies on a symmetrical defense, Sveaborg had many weaknesses.
- Although the Russian army was at first much smaller (2000 men, 60 cannons) than the forces at Sveaborg (6000 men, 734 cannons), more reinforcements arrived all the time. By the time of the negotiations, the Russian army was larger than the defending force.
- The fortress had earlier received very poor funding. Since its completion in 1791, Sveaborg received no extra financial support from the government (the reason for that is still a mystery, but naturally related to the weak Swedish economic situation). The military equipment was in an unsatisfactory condition. Most of the supplies were of bad quality and the fortress lacked most supplies.
- The cannons too, were old and partially obsolete. This meant that their range was shorter than that of the Russian artillery (which is a problem if cannons are stationed on a fortress). The fortress was unable to return fire on the Russian troops that were bombarding the fortress heavily. Furthermore, the fortress was lacking cannons; having not even half the number of cannons that were supposed to be on the fortress (almost 1600 cannons).
- Sveaborg had never been fully completed. Only the fortifications on the islands had been constructed but none of the land-side defenses included in the original plans by Augustin Ehrensvärd were constructed.
- Unwillingness by the Swedes to burn or shell the town of Helsingfors to the ground gained Russians a strong base of operations against the fortifications; doing so would have been according to some historians the best solution for preventing Russians from successfully besieging the fortress.
- The war came as a surprise, and the 2000 civilians at Sveaborg were not evacuated in time. They were mostly families of the officers. It is possible that the commander, Cronstedt, wanted to save the lives of the women and children at Sveaborg. In those days fortress invasions were very bloody stories and no one was usually spared. Moreover, many of the officers' families were living in Helsinki and the Russian army was using their correspondence cunningly to convince the officers at Sveaborg that the Russian army was substantially larger than it was and that the whole kingdom of Sweden had been invaded. Many of the officers were pressuring Cronstedt to surrender.
- Cronstedt was part of the Finnish-Swedish aristocracy, many of whom had come to believe, following the repeated Russian occupations of Finland in previous wars (e.g. the Great Wrath and Lesser Wrath) that the cession of Finland to Russia was inevitable. Indeed some of them had started actively working to bring about such an eventuality, such as Georg Magnus Sprengtporten and Cronstedt's own cousin A. J. Jägerhorn, both of whom had been members of the abortive Anjala Conspiracy. Even if Cronstedt did not consciously share those views, exposure to this belief in the inexorability of Russian conquest might have influenced him subsconsciously, inducing him to overestimate the Russians and inculcating a defeatist attitude.
- Similarly, Cronstedt is known to have personally disliked King Gustav IV Adolf, and he may therefore have been less motivated to fight for the Swedish crown that he had been earlier in his career under a different monarch.

== In literature ==
The Finnish-Swedish poet Johan Ludvig Runeberg wrote a poem called Sveaborg, one of the 35 short poems that together constitute The Tales of Ensign Stål, an epic narrative of the Finnish War published between 1848 and 1860. The poems are strongly nationalist in tone, and Cronstedt is unequivocally assigned sole blame for the Swedish defeat in the war, with the last three verses of Sveaborg calling for him to be subject to damnatio memoriae:

Hide away his family, do not mention his tribe,
Do not turn away from his crime.
Let no one blush on account of his shame,
It sticks to him alone.
He, who has betrayed his land, has
No family, no tribe, no son, no father.

Name him only as the false arm
Sent to Finland's aid.
Name him "Shame" and "Scorn" and "Disgust",
And "Guilt" and "Punishment" and "Death".
It is merely what he deserves to be called,
It is to spare the listener.

Take all that is dark in the grave,
And all that is torment in life,
And form a name from it,
And give it to him.
However, even this would arouse less sorrow,
Than that which he brought upon Sveaborg.

A short story "Under Siege" (published in Omni, October, 1985) by George R. R. Martin takes place during the siege of Sveaborg, as well as in a dire future. It is a reworking of an original story "The Fortress" written by Martin as a history paper for college. Both "The Fortress" and "Under Siege", in which time travellers from a dystopian future affect the outcome, can be found in Martin's collection of short stories Dreamsongs, published by Bantam.

== Bibliography ==
- Nordling, Carl (2004). "Capturing 'The Gibraltar of the North:' How Swedish Sveaborg was taken by the Russians in 1808". Journal of Slavic Military Studies. 17 (4): 715–725. doi:10.1080/13518040490520008.
- Mattila, Tapani (1983). Meri maamme turvana [Sea safeguarding our country] (in Finnish). Jyväskylä: K. J. Gummerus Osakeyhtiö. ISBN 951-99487-0-8.
