= Karl Knorring =

Russian lieutenant-general (1746–1820)

Baron Karl Knorring
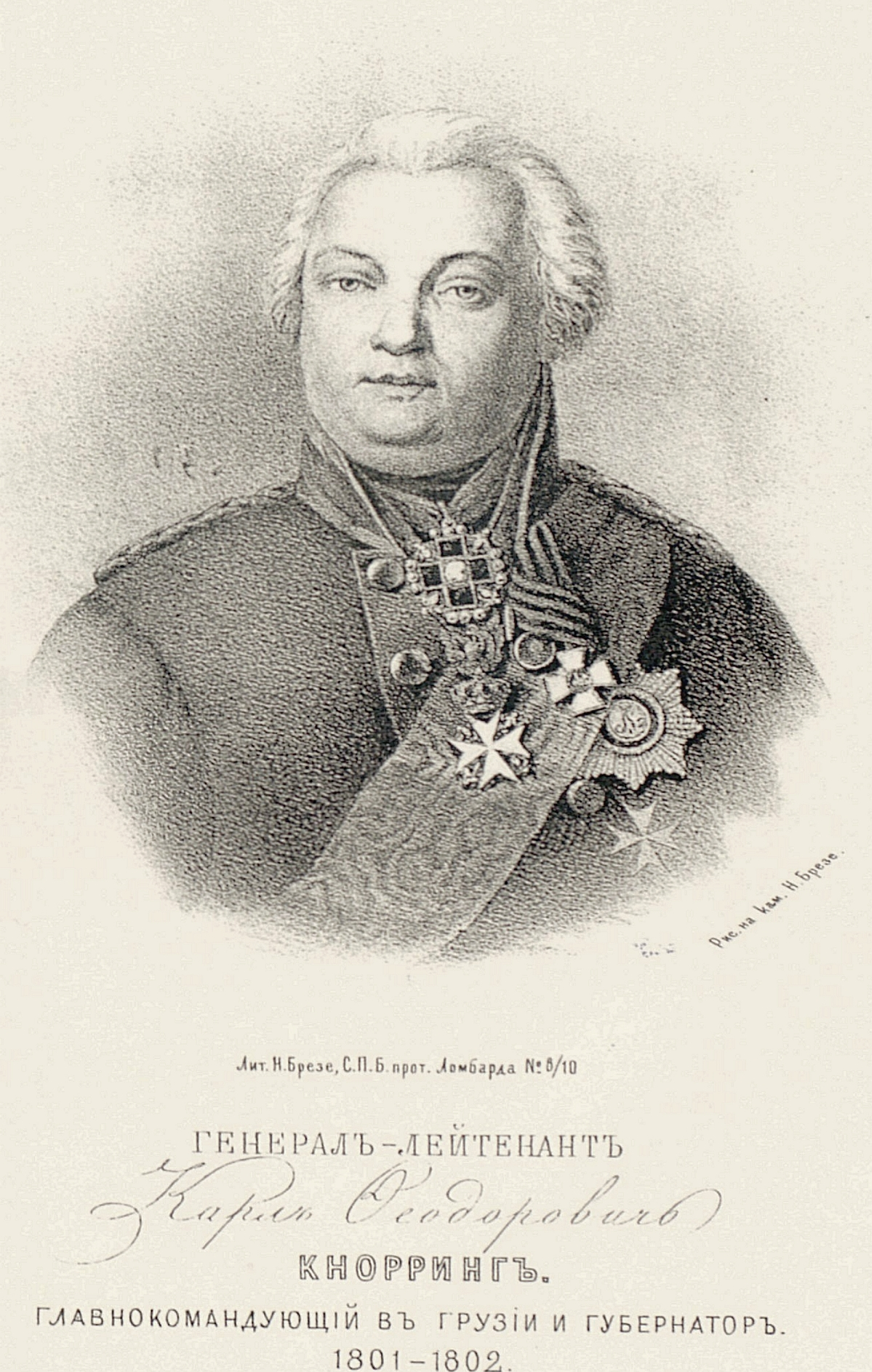
- Illustration of Karl Knorring, dated 1865
- Native name: Крал Фёдорович Кнорринг
- Born: Karl Heinrich von Knorring; 22 May 1746; Koeru Parish, Governorate of Estonia, Russian Empire
- Died: 12 February 1820 (aged 73) Moscow, Russian Empire
- Buried: Vvedenskoye Cemetery, Moscow
- Allegiance: Russian Empire
- Branch: Imperial Russian Army
- Service years: 1764–1803
- Rank: Lieutenant general
- Commands: Caucasus Forces
- Conflicts: Russo-Turkish War (1768–1774); Russo-Turkish War (1787–1792)
- Awards: Order of Saint Anna (1st class); Order of St. George (4th class)

High commissioner of the Caucasus
- In office 1801–1802
- Monarch: Alexander I
- Preceded by: Viceroyalty established
- Succeeded by: Pavel Tsitsianov

Karl Fyodorovich von Knorring (Russian: Карл Фёдорович фон Кно́рринг; 22 May 1746 - 12 February 1820) was a lieutenant-general of the Russian Empire.

== Career ==
Karl Heinrich von Knorring was born into the Knorring family, which belonged to the Baltic German nobility. Karl's elder brother, Bogdan von Knorring (1746–1825) was also a Russian general. He served as the inspector of the Caucasian Line from March 1799 to late 1802. He played an important role in the incorporation of Eastern Georgia (Kartli-Kakheti) into the Russian Empire. He was dismissed as a result of being unable to make the area stable, as well as the corruption of his appointed officials.

== Personal life ==
Karl was married to Varvara Vladimirovna Davidova (d. 1836), member of the Russian nobility. The marriage produced no children.

== Death ==
He died after 1805.

== Sources ==
- Bournoutian, George (2021). From the Kur to the Aras: A Military History of Russia's Move into the South Caucasus and the First Russo-Iranian War, 1801–1813. Brill. ISBN 978-9004445154.
