= Jägerhorn af Spurila =

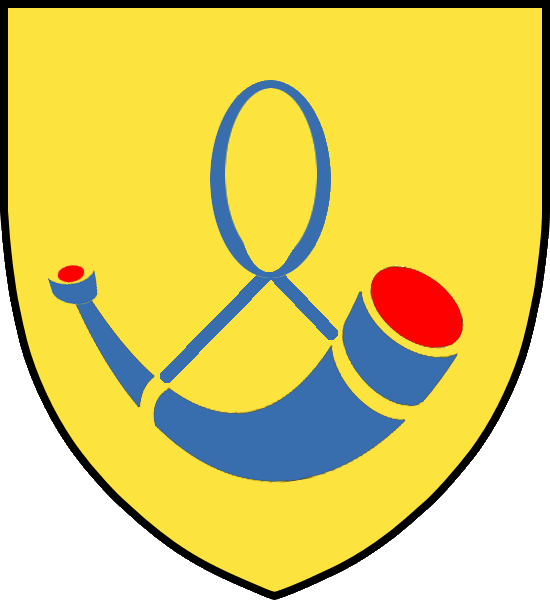
Coat of arms of Jägerhorn af Spurila family

The Jägerhorn af Spurila family is a noble family, registered with number 114 in the Swedish House of Nobility and number 5 in the Finnish House of Nobility. Members of this family live in Finland, Sweden, France and the United States.

== Family background ==
The family is of ancient Swedish nobility (frälse) from Paimio in Finland Proper. Squire Nisse Pedersson is regarded as the most likely first head of the family. He held tax exempt property (frälsejord) in Loppis of Paimio, which was subject to the kings general reduction in 1396 (Nyköpings recess) which decision was executed in Finland 1405. Nisse Pedersson sealed a property transaction in 1399. His son Peder Nilsson participated in a summons of the nobility in Turku in 1439. His son, squire Nils Pedersson of Hevonpää is mentioned 1464; he wears a hunting horn in his seal 10 March 1471. His son, squire Peder Nilsson of Hevonpää, was married to the daughter of Klas Henriksson (Horn of Kankas), member of the privy council and lawspeaker, and Kristersdotter Frille. Peder Nilsson was acting as the first lawspeaker in a land court in Kimito of Finland Proper 1500. In old genealogies the Jägerhorn af Storby and Jägerskiöld families as well as other noble families with similar coats of arms were assumed to be of the same origin as Jägerhorn af Spurila. Later research has, however, not verified such conclusions.

A family tree dated 1769 presents a legend about the origins of the Jägerhorn family, most likely inspired by the Song of Roland; this family tree also ties the Jägerhorn af Spurila, Jägerhorn af Storby and Jägerskiöld (von Jägerhorn) families together (translation from Swedish):

This family is so old that it is impossible to establish the time of ennoblement with certainty. However, the forefathers of this family have truthfully explained that the first head of the family was called Rötker Ingesson, whom king Eric IX, or Eric the Holy as he is called, took as his squire due to the handsome appearance, unseen strength and manhood, during the king's visit in Finland in the 1150s. The king took this man with him when returning to Sweden. This Rötker Ingesson was in 1160 commanding a group of cavalry during a fight between the Swedes and the Danes and was carrying a signal horn of that time. When attacking the Danes with great force making them retreat, he blew the sound of victory, which made the Danish Army flee trembling with fear. The Danes left its conqueror valuable treasures with which the "Danish church" Danmarks kyrka close to Uppsala was built and Rötker Ingesson was henceforth called Jagarhorn [...]

Jägarhorn is Swedish for "Hunter's horn".

== Registration as nobility ==
Peder Nilsson of Hevonpää's grandson's grandson, Colonel Christer Classon of Spurila, had his family introduced in the Swedish House of Nobility with number 86 (later amended to 114) when the House was established by Gustavus Adolphus in 1625. Colonel Classon's son Johan Henriksson of Spurila was a page of Gustavus II Adolphus until the king's death in the battle of Lützen (1632). The name Jägerhorn af Spurila was given only about 1634 apparently to avoid confusion with another family with a similar coat of arms that was introduced to the House, namely Jägerhorn af Storby. The Jägerhorn af Spurila family was assumed in the knights class of the Swedish nobility in 1778, and it was introduced in the Finnish House of Nobility in 1820 with number 5.

== Known members of the family ==
- Georg Henrik Jägerhorn (1747–1826), lieutenant general, participated in Gustav III's Russian war 1788–1790 and was commander (Sw. överkommendant) of the Stockholm garrison 1808 and member of the Swedish regency council.
- Johan Anders Jägerhorn (younger) (1757–1825), lieutenant colonel, participated in king Gustav III:s revolution of 1772, in the Anjala conspiracy 1788 and acted as an intermediary between Lord Edward FitzGerald and the French for the Irish independence movement United Irishmen.
- Fredrik Adolf Jägerhorn (1760–1817), colonel, governor, vice-commander and commander Carl Olof Cronstedt's friend in the Sveaborg fortress. Younger brother of Johan Anders Jägerhorn.
- Reinhold Johan Jägerhorn (1719–1790), lieutenant colonel, known for his critics in the Swedish parliament in 1765-66 about the stepmotherish treatment of Finland.
- Carl Johan Jägerhorn (1819–1879), governor, grandson of Reinhold Johan Jägerhorn.
- Carl Georg Jägerhorn (1866–1945), lawyer, Helsinki, Finland.

== See also ==
- The National Biography of Finland
- Swedish-speaking Finns

== Sources ==
- Kansallisbiografia 4, Seppo Suvanto
- Ättartavlor, Carpelan
- Jägerhorniana, Finnish House of Nobility
- Svenskt biografiskt lexikon, Grill (editor)
