= Johan Anders Jägerhorn =

Finnish noble (1752–1825)

Johan (Jan) Anders Jägerhorn af Spurila (1752-1825) was a Finnish nobleman born on 8 April 1757 in Helsinki county, at that time a part of Sweden. He was the eldest son of lieutenant colonel Fredrik Anders Jägerhorn and Ulrika Sofia Brunow. Colonel Fredrik Adolf Jägerhorn, vice commander of the Sveaborg fortress in 1808 was Johan Anders' brother.

== Life ==
The Jägerhorn af Spurila noble family tree can be documented to 15th century Finland with legends - inspired by the Song of Roland - going back to the 12th century when Swedish crusader king Eric the Saint of Sweden came to Finland and made an early ancestor of the family squire of the king.

Johan Anders Jägerhorn was a military officer with the rank of major in the Swedish army and lieutenant colonel in the Russian army 1789.

As a participant in an officers’ plot against the Swedish king in Finland 1788, Jägerhorn advocated sovereignty for Finland. Condemned to death by the Swedes on the ground of treason, he was exiled to Germany. In Hamburg he befriended Lord Edward FitzGerald and acted as an intermediary between the Irish and the French before the rebellion of 1798. After two years’ imprisonment (1799–1801) in the Tower of London, he returned to Finland and was instrumental in shaping the constitution of newly autonomous Finland. After having been part of the Swedish kingdom for more than 600 years, Finland became an autonomous Russian Grand Duchy in 1809. Jägerhorn was thus one of the historical originators of Finnish independence. Finland declared independence on 6 December 1917.

Johan Anders Jägerhorn was the founder and leader of a secret order called Walhalla-orden with its seat in the Suomenlinna fortress.

He was married to Ulrika Sofia Blomcreutz of Swedish nobility in 1783. Jägerhorn died in Porvoo, Finland on 6 March 1825. His only two daughters had died at early age in tragic accidents.

== Legacy ==
In 1981, Minister Desmond O'Malley of Ireland unveiled a commemorative plaque adorning Jägerhorn's house in Porvoo, Finland and stated: "If this man has spent 2 years of prison for the independence of Ireland, he is indeed worthy of this plaque."

== Sources ==
- Bruno Lesch (1941), Jan Anders Jägerhorn : patriot och världsborgare, separatist och emigrant : en tidsskild ring / Bruno Lesch., Skrifter utgivna av Svenska litteratursällskapet i Finland (in Swedish), Helsinki: Society of Swedish Literature in Finland, ISSN 0039-6842, Wikidata Q113525797
