= Lejonströmsbron =

Bridge in Skellefteå, Sweden

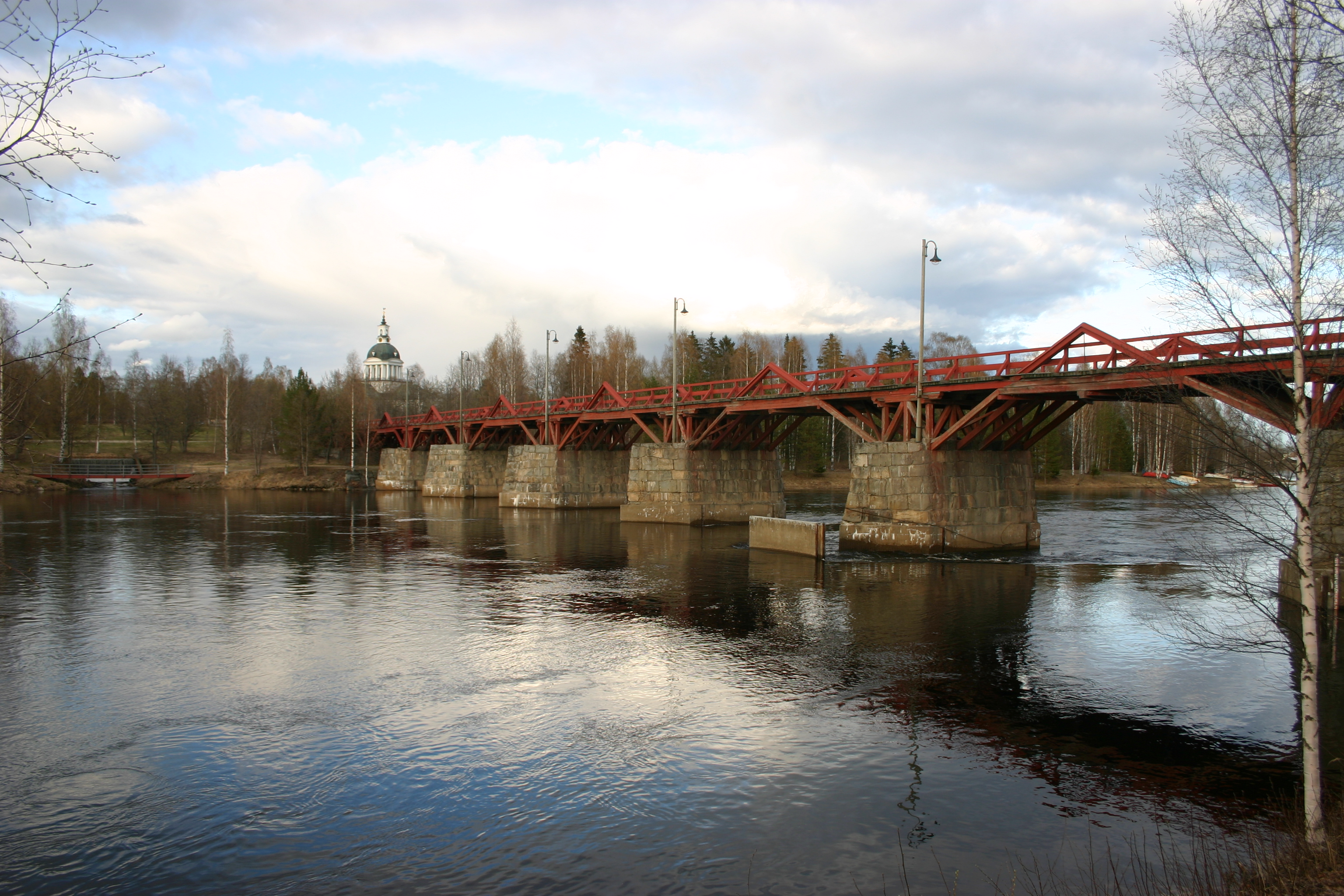
- Coordinates: 64°44′59″N 20°54′47″E
- Crosses: Skellefte River
- Locale: Skellefteå
- Official name: Lejonströmsbron

Characteristics
- Material: Wood
- Total length: 207 m (679 ft)
- Width: 5 m (16 ft)

History
- Designer: Carl Spennare
- Construction start: 1735; 291 years ago
- Opened: 1737; 289 years ago

Location
- Interactive map of Lejonströmsbron

Lejonströmsbron is a wooden bridge in Skellefteå, Sweden, crossing Skellefte River between the boroughs Sunnanå and Prästbordet, near the parish church for Skellefteå landsförsamling. The bridge was completed in 1737 and is the oldest wooden bridge in Sweden. It is 207.5 metres (681 ft) in length, and was for a long time Sweden's longest wooden bridge (until a 230-meter long wooden bridge was built in Gimonäs in Umeå in 2006).

During its first years of operation, the toll to cross the bridge was:

- A walking person - 1 öre
- A rider on horseback - 3 öre
- Carts pulled by a horse - 6 öre
- Wagon pulled by several horses - 12 öre

In 1868 a speed limit was introduced over the bridge. If a person drove or rode faster than a pedestrian, they could be fined five riksdaler.

Lejonströmsbron was declared a listed building in Sweden in 1994.

The last war battles that took place on Swedish soil, took place in north Sweden under the Finnish War, also known as the 1808–09 war. On May 15, 1809 the Battle of Lejonströmsbron occurred.

== Gallery ==
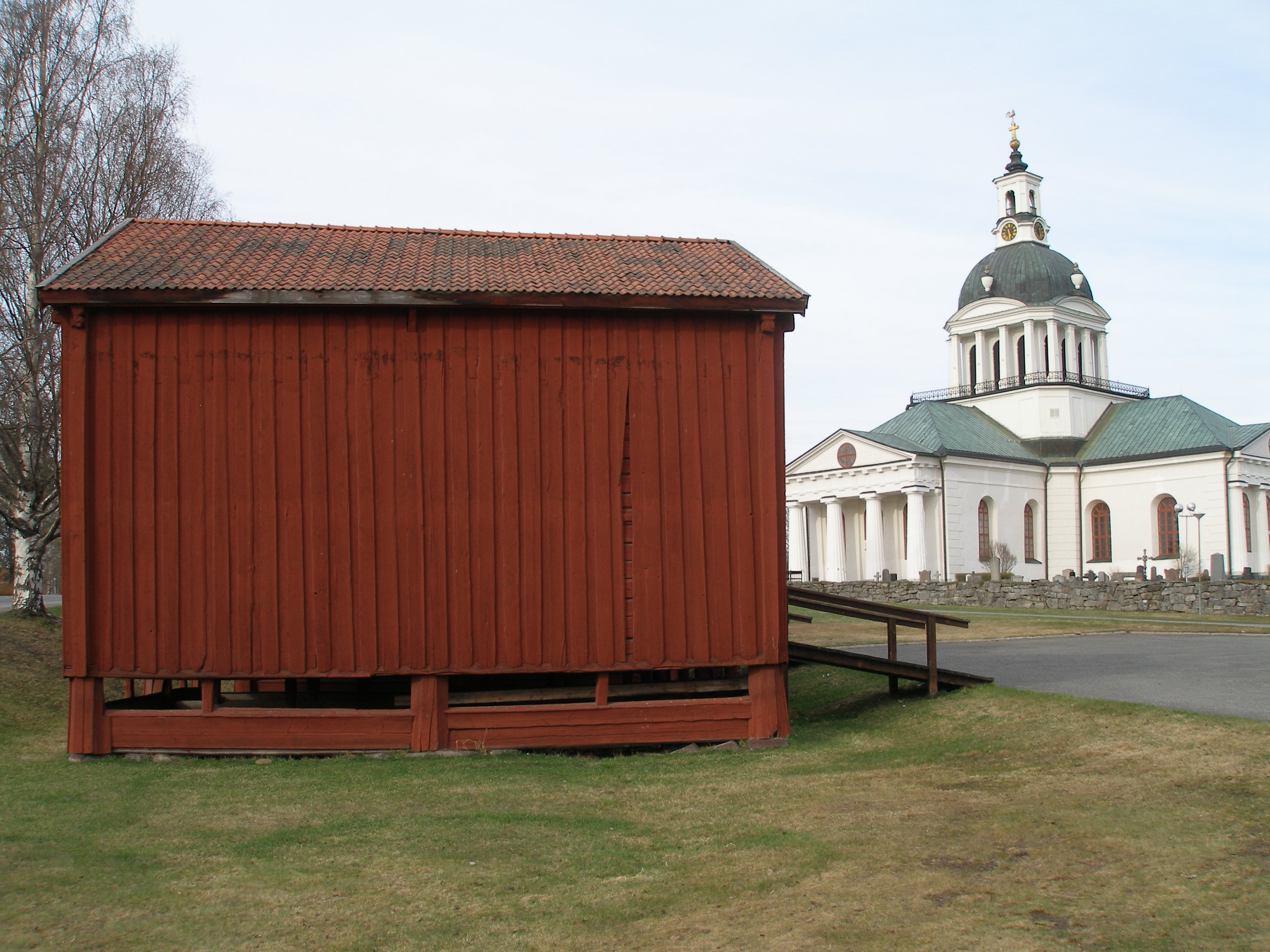
Storehouses at the north end of Lejonströmsbron, with bullet holes from the battle of 1809.

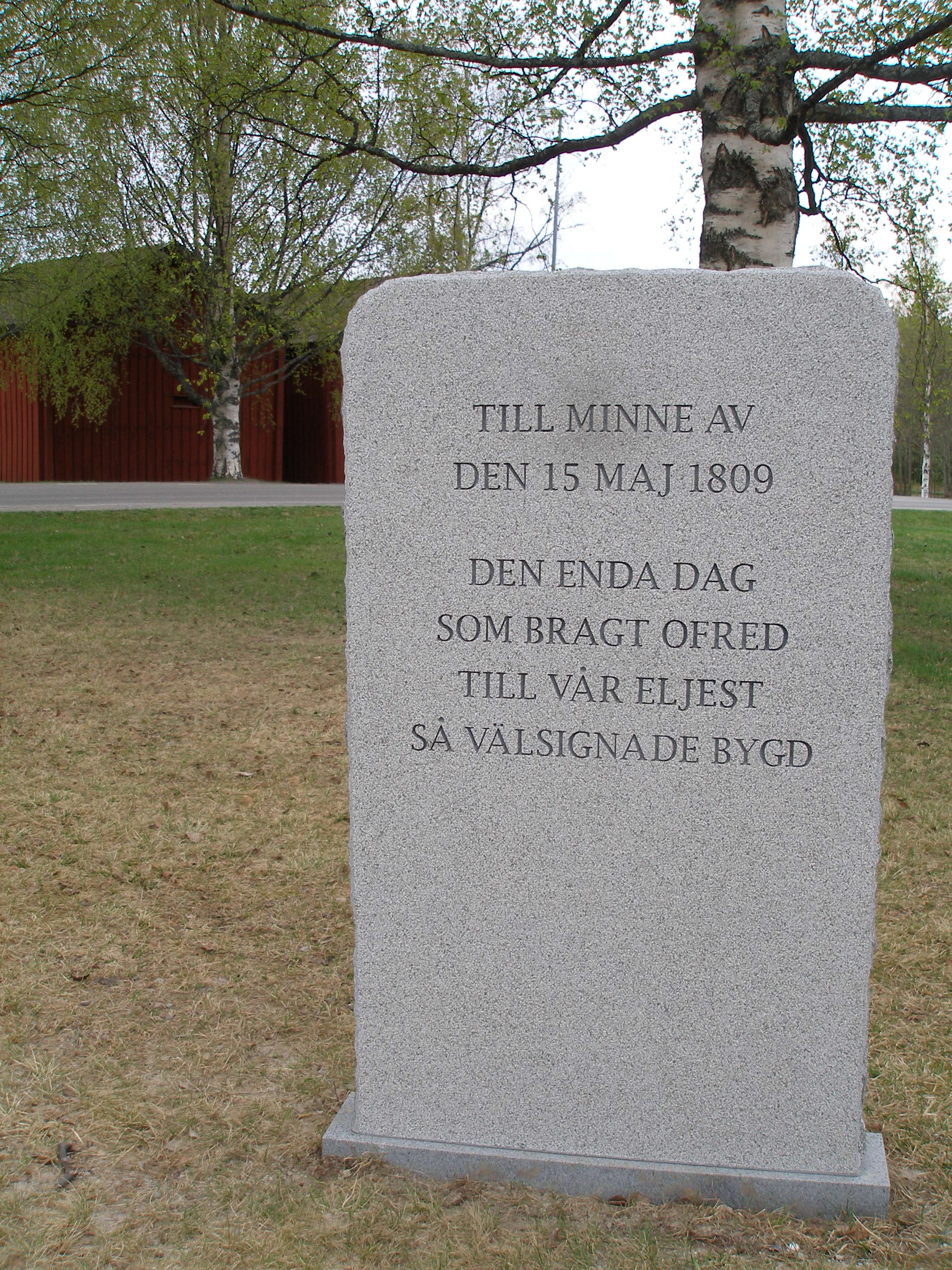
Memorystone for the battle in 1809 at Lejonströmsbron

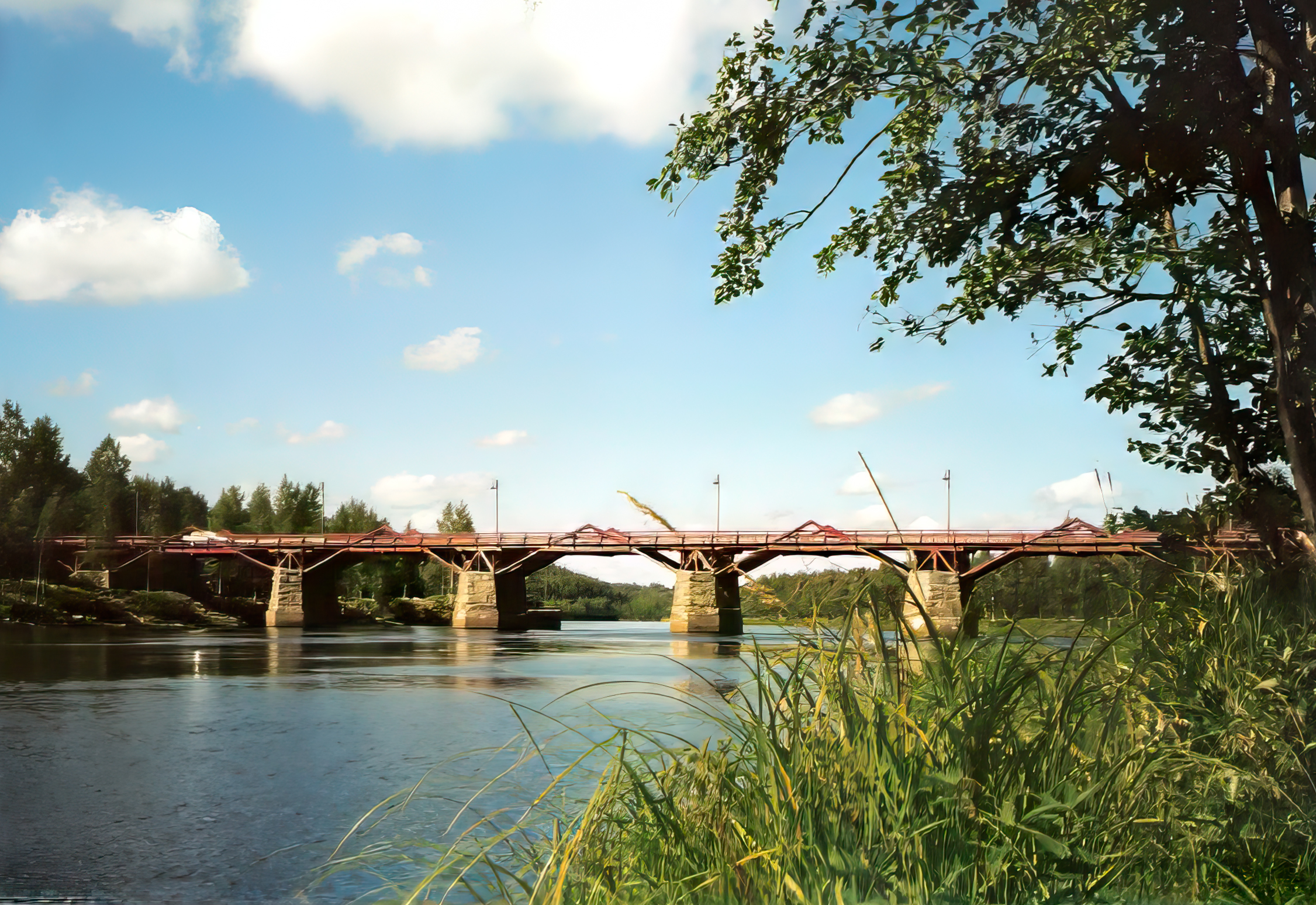
Lejonströmsbron

== See also ==
- List of bridges
