= Carl Olof Cronstedt =

Swedish naval commander (1756–1820)

Vice admiral Carl Olof Cronstedt
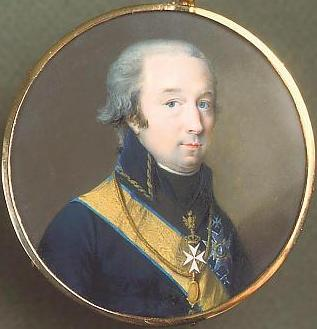
- Miniature by Jacob Axel Gillberg
- Born: Carl Olof Cronstedt; 3 October 1756; Botby mansion, Finland
- Died: 7 April 1820 (aged 63); Hertonäs, Grand Duchy of Finland
- Relatives: Johan Gabriel Cronstedt (father); Hedvig Juliana Jägerhorn af Spurila (mother)
- Military career
- Allegiance: Sweden; (Kingdom of Great Britain) Great Britain; Russian Empire
- Branch: Swedish Royal Navy; Royal Navy
- Service years: 1765–1808
- Rank: Vice admiral
- Commands: Fleet of the Army; Sveaborg Garrison
- Conflicts: American Revolutionary War; Russo-Swedish War (1788–1790); Battle of Svensksund; Finnish War; Siege of Sveaborg (POW)
- Awards: Commander with the Great Cross of the Order of the Sword; Knight with the Great Cross of the Order of the Sword

Carl Olof Cronstedt the elder (3 October 1756 – 7 April 1820) was a Swedish naval commander responsible for the overwhelming Swedish victory at the Second Battle of Svensksund, one of the largest naval battles in the history of the Baltic Sea. He is often better remembered, however, as the commander of the fortress of Sveaborg (Finnish: Suomenlinna) during the Finnish War in 1808–09, which was fought between Sweden and Imperial Russia, and ended in Cronstedt surrendering the fortress.

== Biography ==
Cronstedt was born on Botby mansion (now a part of Helsinki) in Finland on 3 October 1756. His parents were Johan Gabriel Cronstedt and Hedvig Juliana Jägerhorn af Spurila. He joined the army in 1765 and advanced to the rank of lieutenant in 1773. Three years later, Cronstedt, like many Swedish officers of the day, volunteered to serve abroad in the ongoing American War of Independence, and served in the Royal Navy until 1779. Intriguingly, unlike most Swedish officers who had traditionally gone into foreign service under France, Cronstedt elected to fight for the British, and it is believed that by doing so he learned a great deal which he later put to use in his naval career, since Britain was at the time the foremost naval power in the world.

When Sweden in 1788 declared war on Russia he fought in the Swedish royal navy, now a lieutenant colonel. In 1790 he won a great naval victory against the Russian fleet at the naval battle of Svensksund (in the Gulf of Finland). The naval battle is the largest naval battle in the history of the Baltic Sea.

After the naval battle he was promoted to the rank of colonel and was appointed to naval state secretary. After further advances he was soon to become vice admiral. However, shortly after he was to be in disfavor of the new king and was appointed to be commander of Sveaborg. Cronstedt had desires to be commander of the whole royal fleet, not commander of some distant fortress in Finland.

In 1801, he was elected a member of the Royal Swedish Academy of Sciences, but was expelled in 1809.

After the Finnish War, Cronstedt lived the rest of his life in his manor in Herttoniemi, near Helsinki.

== Siege of Sveaborg ==
Cronstedt surrendered the fortress to the Russian army after a siege of two months. The fortress had internationally received the reputation of being "the Gibraltar of the North", and was by some assumed to be impregnable. In the peace treaty next year (1809), Sweden was forced to give up the territory of Finland (about half of the kingdom). In order to find scapegoats for the loss of Finland the surrendering of Sveaborg became a convenient vehicle, and as Cronstedt was the responsible officer, he was charged with the whole catastrophe.

Today, however, many historians are re-evaluating the action of Cronstedt. His decision to surrender the fortress is by some considered a great humanitarian act, to prevent the children and women within from being killed by the Russians (many of the civilians from Helsinki had fled to the fortress). Furthermore, some claim that Sweden were doomed to lose the war from the beginning, citing its unpreparedness and lack of necessary resources. This narrative would make Cronstedt a convenient scapegoat, and deflect criticism from King Gustav IV Adolf.

== Sveaborg in the Finnish War ==
War broke out 21 February 1808 on the initiative of the Russian Empire. The timing was unusual, as wars were usually fought in summertime, and the temperature at that time was −30 °C (−22 °F). Because of the cold winter, the poor condition of the Swedish army and the plan to retreat to the north, the Russian army faced poor resistance in Finland. So, the Finnish territory was overrun and half of the kingdom (Finland) was conquered in a few months. The Swedish main force retreated towards Sweden, leaving Sveaborg and Svartholm to defend themselves. The idea was that the fortresses would hold out and that reinforcements would arrive in the next summer. The fortress Svartholm surrendered already on 18 March. The siege of Sveaborg began in early March. After only three weeks of siege, negotiations between Carl-Olof Cronstedt and the commander of the Russian unit Jan Pieter van Suchtelen were held. The negotiations resulted in a deal, that if no reinforcements had arrived by 3 May, the fortress would unconditionally surrender. Unfortunately for the Swedes, the sea was still frozen in May 1808 and royal fleet could not arrive, therefore Sveaborg surrendered on 3 May.

== The legacy of Cronstedt ==
The surrender of Sveaborg is undoubtedly one of the most important events in the history of Finland. Therefore, Carl-Olof Cronstedt is naturally a central character of it. In Sweden, he was recognized as a traitor after the war, condemned to death in the court of Stockholm (later abolished on the initiative of the Russian emperor). He alone was made responsible for the loss of Finland, and therefore ending one era in Swedish history. During the earlier, era of greatness Sweden was in the 17th century recognized as a major power in Europe, and now Sweden had become a shadow of its former self.

Cronstedt was also condemned as a traitor by many in Finland. The Finnish War was seen as an embarrassment for Finland until Johan Ludvig Runeberg wrote the national romantic poem collection The Tales of Ensign Stål (Swedish: Fänrik Ståls sägner), which serves as a loose narrative of the conflict. In these poems, Runeberg depicts the ordinary Finnish soldiers as fighting heroically, with their defeats being attributable not to any lack of courage or steadfastness on their part but rather to the incompetence and cowardice of their officers and the king himself. Thus Runeberg's efforts to strengthen Finnish national identity rested on the denigration of men like Cronstedt. This is particularly clear in the last three verses of the poem Sveaborg, which explicitly excuse the Finnish nation from blame for the loss of that fortress, while excoriating Cronstedt and calling for him to be subject to a form of damnatio memoriae:

Hide away his family, do not mention his tribe,
Do not turn away from his crime.
Let no one blush on account of his shame,
It sticks to him alone.
He, who has betrayed his land, has
No family, no tribe, no son, no father.

Name him only as the false arm
Sent to Finland's aid.
Name him "Shame" and "Scorn" and "Disgust",
And "Guilt" and "Punishment" and "Death".
It is merely what he deserves to be called,
It is to spare the listener.

Take all that is dark in the grave,
And all that is torment in life,
And form a name from it,
And give it to him.
However, even this would arouse less sorrow,
Than that which he brought upon Sveaborg.

The old legacy of Carl Olof Cronstedt was that Sweden was forced to give up half of its kingdom, whereas modern historians seem to explain the developments at Sveaborg by primarily smart psychological warfare combined with the widely spread low morale among Swedish officers. Today, Sweden and Finland are separate sovereign nations.

In 1990's Cronstedt was remembered by naming a newly built street in Helsinki after him. Amiraali Cronstedtin ranta (Admiral Cronstedt's Quay) is located about one kilometre from the preserved admiral's manor in Herttoniemi.

== Sources ==
- Olof af Hällström, Sveaborg - The Island Fortress off Helsinki (1986)
- Magnus Ullman, Örlogshistoriska episoder (1997)
- C. J. Gardberg, Sveaborg (1997)
- Göran Eriksson, Slaget vid Rilax 1714 (2006)
- Johan Ludvig Runeberg, The Tales of Ensign Stål
- Odelberg Wilhelm. Viceadmiral Carl Olof Cronstedt (1954)
- William Monteith, Narrative of the Conquest of Finland by the Russians in the Years 1808-9 (1854)
- Cronstedt, Carl Olof (1756-1820). Biografisk Lexikon för Finland. www.blf.fi/artikel.php?id=575
