= Jan Pieter van Suchtelen =

Dutch-Swedish-Russian diplomat and art collector (1751–1836)

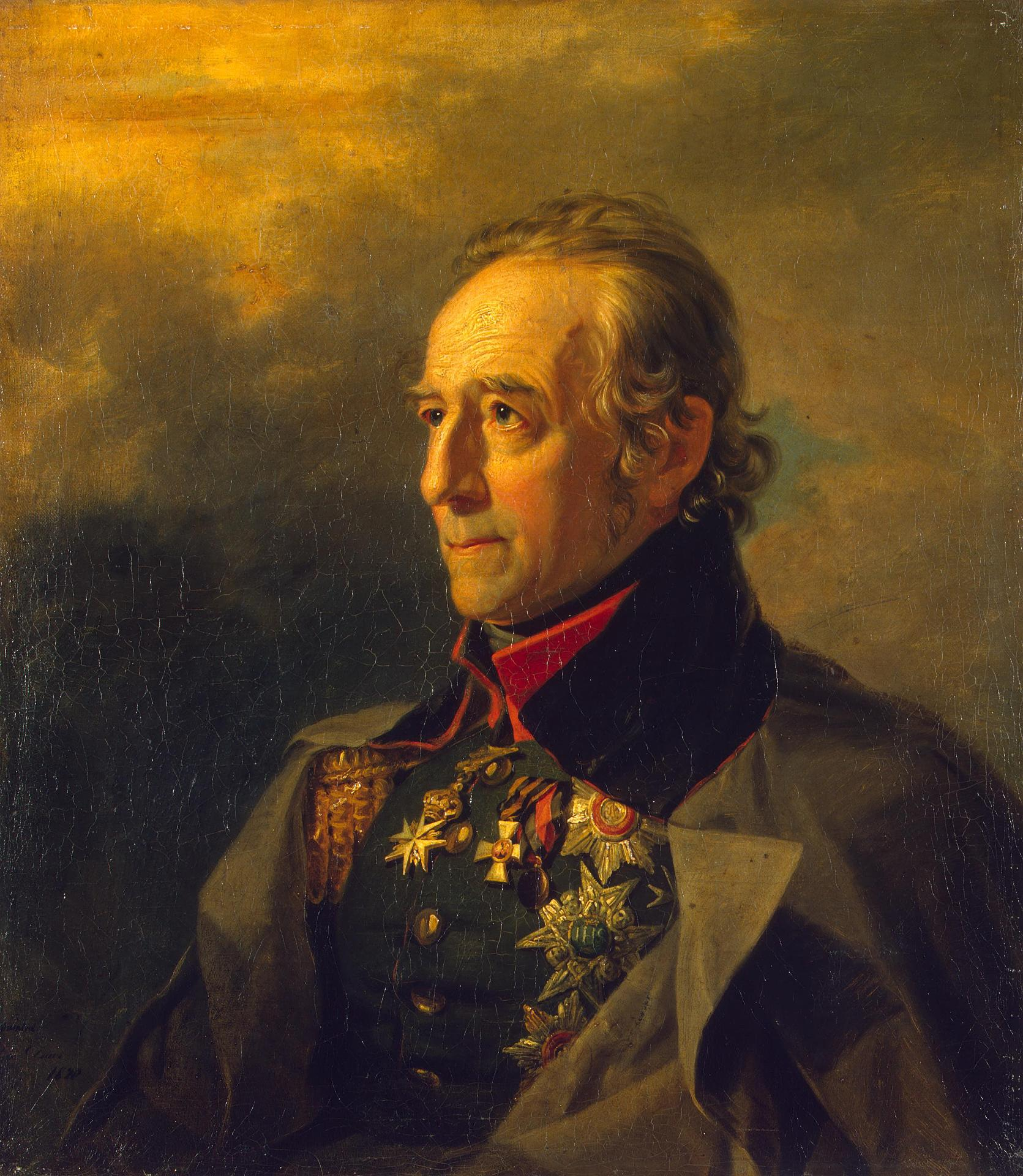
- Jan Pieter van Suchtelen, Count of Liikkala.
- Born: 2 August 1751; Grave, Netherlands
- Died: 6 January 1836 (aged 84); Stockholm
- Occupations: Military engineer, diplomat
- Known for: Siege of Sveaborg 1808; Russian minister to Sweden 1810–1836

Jan Pieter van Suchtelen, Count of Liikkala, Pyotr Kornilovich Suchtelen/Sukhtelen (2 August 1751, in Grave – 6 January 1836, in Stockholm), was a Dutch-born general in the Russian army and diplomat who became best known in Finland as the commander of the siege of Sveaborg during the Russo-Swedish War (1808–1809), and in Sweden as Russian minister to Stockholm from 1810 until his death. In 1812 Suchtelen was the plenipotentiary for Russian Emperor Alexander I in Örebro where he negotiated and signed the Treaty of Örebro which brought to an end the Anglo-Russian War (1807–1812). In that treaty his titles included "general of engineers, quarter-master general, [and] member of the council of state".

He was active as military engineer. He established a preliminary project of the Modlin Fortress, near Warsaw, when Russia captured this area after the third partition of Poland.

== Military career ==
Since 1783 he actively worked in Russia, having been summoned by Catherine II to develop the Russian engineering corps. He was active as a military engineer and established a preliminary project of the Modlin Fortress, near Warsaw, when Russia captured this area after the third partition of Poland. For his project of Staro-Kalinkin Bridge in St Petersburg he was promoted to the rank of colonel.

== Siege of Sveaborg ==
During the Russo-Swedish War (1808–1809), van Suchtelen served as quartermaster general of the Russian army in Finland. The decisive confrontation took place in the spring of 1808 between van Suchtelen, who directed the siege of Sveaborg, and the fortress's Swedish commander, Vice Admiral Carl Olof Cronstedt. The capitulation of Sveaborg — the great sea fortress outside Helsinki — has been described as close to a mystery. In the account of the war that van Suchtelen wrote in the 1820s he revealed no details about the negotiations or any possible political arrangements, noting only that Admiral Cronstedt represented the wrong branch of the armed forces and had conducted the defence as if commanding a warship, and that the most important cause was Cronstedt's uncertain and indecisive nature. The forceful and charismatic van Suchtelen apparently came close to hypnotising Cronstedt into signing an agreement whereby the fortress would capitulate after a month's ceasefire on 3 May 1808. This hastened the end of the war and the Treaty of Fredrikshamn of 1809.

== Diplomatic career ==
In 1812 Suchtelen was the plenipotentiary for Russian Emperor Alexander I in Örebro where he negotiated and signed the Treaty of Örebro which brought to an end the Anglo-Russian War (1807–1812). In that treaty his titles included "general of engineers, quarter-master general, [and] member of the council of state".

Alexander I appointed van Suchtelen as Russian minister to Stockholm in 1810, a post he held for over twenty years until his death. His task was to consolidate the peace achieved by the Treaty of Fredrikshamn, prevent any Swedish revanchism and assure the Swedes that Russia had no territorial ambitions beyond the Gulf of Bothnia. When Crown Prince Charles XIV John proposed at their first meeting that they should speak as soldiers, van Suchtelen responded by emphasising that the Gulf of Bothnia was too good a border for either party to cross. This policy culminated in the treaty of 1812 and the negotiations at Åbo, which for a long time secured Swedish neutrality toward Russia's enemies.

Van Suchtelen became respected and well-liked in all circles in Stockholm. He gave regular dinners and receptions, reserving Saturdays as a journée des savants for learned and literary guests.

Created count, enrolled to the nobility of Finland where his main estate was located.

== Book collection ==
Van Suchtelen was a passionate bibliophile. He began collecting academic dissertations in Finland immediately in 1808, and in Sweden acquired among other things professor Carl Peter Thunberg's collection of dissertations from Åbo, Uppsala and Lund. His collection eventually comprised over 30,000 titles, with a significant proportion from Germany and the Netherlands. When Nicholas I of Russia purchased van Suchtelen's vast library for the Imperial Library in St Petersburg, Count R.H. Rehbinder managed — on the initiative of university librarian Professor F.W. Pipping — to secure the collection of academic dissertations for Helsinki University Library. This proved of particular significance following the Great Fire of Turku of 1827, which destroyed much of the earlier Finnish academic heritage.

== Later life ==
Charlotte Disbrowe visited Sweden in 1834, where her father, (Sir Edward Cromwell Disbrowe, a senior diplomat with the British Foreign Office) was stationed. She met Van Suchtelen and mentioned in her biography that:

Amongst the visitors I had forgotten to name General Suchtelen, the Russian Minister, who had been in Sweden from time immemorial, and was supposed to have come out of the ark. He was made very much of at that Court, indeed was allowed privileges not granted to other diplomatists, and my father had some difficulty in consequence of obtaining the proper position due to him as the accredited Minister of the Court of St. James. General Suchtelen had two brothers attached to his Legation as secretaries, of the name of Bodisko. They were known as Beau Disko and Laid Disko, for obvious reasons.

Van Suchtelen died in Stockholm in 1836. He is buried at Solna churchyard.
