= Raid on Kamennobrodskoye =

Circassian raid against Russian Empire in 1809

- Part of the Russo-Circassian War
Date	November 7, 1809
Location	Kamennobrodskoye Governorate
Result	Circassian victory

Belligerents
Russian Empire	Circassia (primarily Kabardians)

Commanders and leaders
Unknown	Unknown

Strength
Unknown (settlers and civilians)	5,000

Casualties and losses
130+ civilians killed 350 taken captive Entire village destroyed	Unknown

The Raid on Kamennobrodskoye or Kamennobrodskoye massacre was a surprise attack carried out by Kabardian and other Circassian mountaineer forces against the Russian settlement of Kamennobrodskoye on November 7, (according to some sources, November 2) 1809 in Russo-Circassian War.

== History ==
On November 7, 1809, a group of mountaineers, joined by Kabardians, reported to be some 5000 strong) carried out a raid deep into the Stavropol Governorate and destroyed the Russian settlement of Kamennobrodskoye. The villagers fled in panic; many took refuge inside the local church, hoping to escape. However, the attackers broke into the church and killed everyone hiding inside.

According to Russian sources, over 130 people of both sexes were killed, 350 were taken captive, all livestock was seized, the outlying farms were burned, and winter crops were trampled. The church floor was reportedly covered in blood and bodies.

One notable episode involved a peasant woman, Avdotya Mikhaylovna, who was captured along with her son, daughter, and a foster child named Fekla. During a prisoner exchange, her own daughter could not be found, but the Circassians offered to return her if Avdotya gave up Fekla. She refused, saying: “God will punish me if I let the orphan perish. I must answer for her before God.”

In early 1810, General Bulgakov led a retaliatory campaign across the Kuban River, attacking Circassian auls and fortifications. However, the results were minimal, and after the Russian withdrawal, raids soon resumed.
