= Gimonäs =

- Residential area
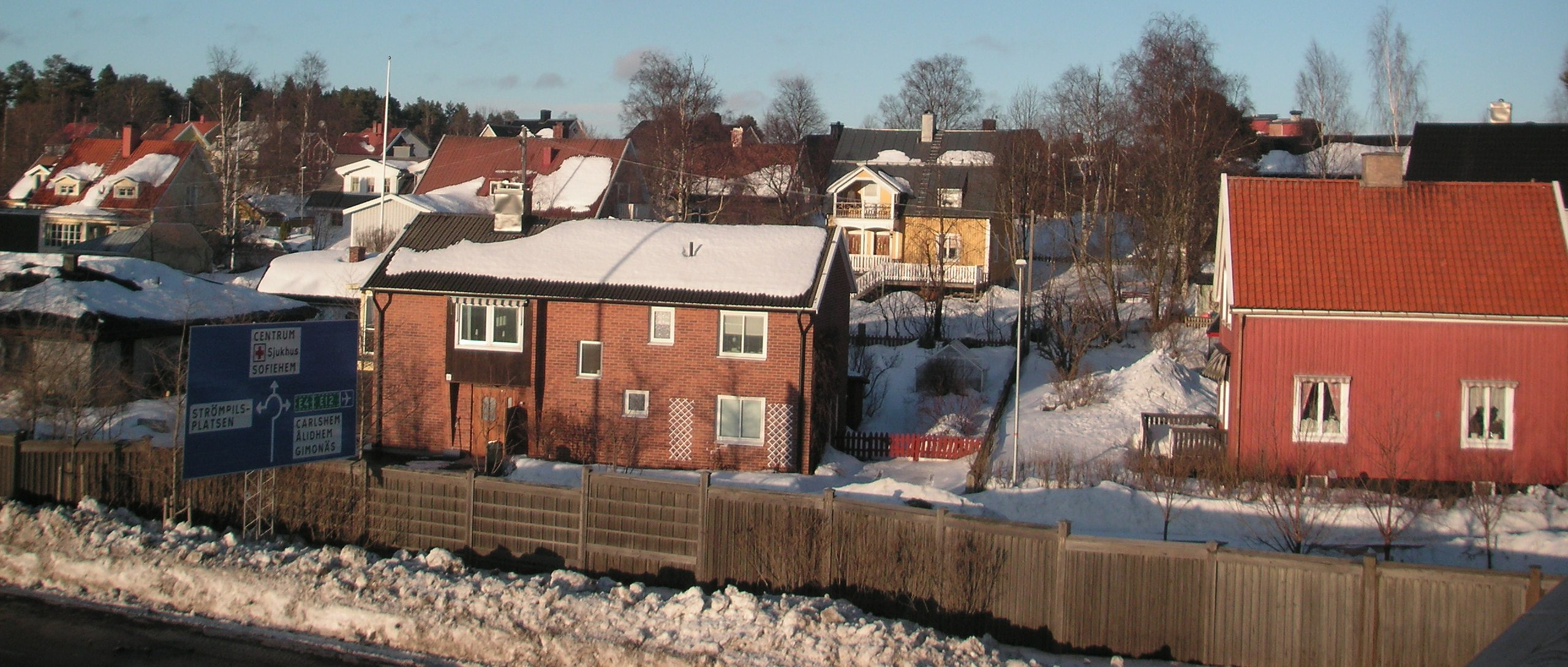

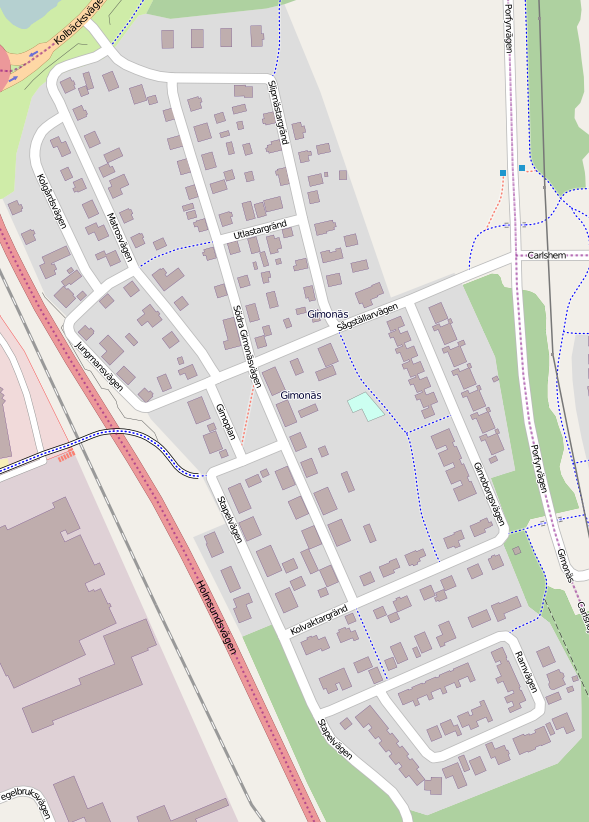
- Map of Gimonäs, from OpenStreetMap
- Coordinates: 63°47′48″N 20°18′40″E
- Country: Sweden
- Province: Västerbotten
- County: Västerbotten County
- Municipality: Umeå Municipality
- Time zone: UTC+1 (CET)
  - Summer (DST): UTC+2 (CEST)

Gimonäs is a residential area in Umeå, Sweden.
