= Blagovest (name) =

Origin
- Origin: Bulgaria
- Meaning: "bringer of good news"
- Region of origin: Bulgaria

Other names
- Related names: Blagovesta

Blagovest (masculine form), Blagovesta (feminine form) (Благовест, Благовеста) is a name often found in Bulgaria. Its meaning is "person who brings kind news".

Notable people with the name include:

- Blagovest Kisyov (born 1986), Bulgarian male badminton player
- Blagovest Sendov (1932–2020), Bulgarian mathematician and politician
- Blagovest Stoyanov (born 1968), Bulgarian Olympic medalist
- Blagovest Nenov (born 1985), Bulgarian Chess player
