= Yehowists =

Russian millenarian religious movement

Yehowists (also Yehowist-Ilyinites, Ilyinists, Ilyintsy, Jehovists, Sect of the Right-hand Brotherhood, The Message of Zion, Russian: ильинцы, секта десного братства, иеговисты, еговисты, Сионская весть) is a Russian Spiritual Christian millenarian religious movement founded by retired army officer and religious thinker Nikolai Ilyin in the 1840s.

== Before the Revolution ==
During Ilyin's life, groups of Ilyinites were founded in different parts of the Russian Empire. This is due to the bulk sending of booklets, both by Ilyin and his followers. The center of the movement, before the Russian Revolution, remained in Ural, but individual groups were also formed in Transcaucasia, Northern Caucasus, and Ukraine. Ilyinites were persecuted periodically and were often punished by exile to Central Asia and other parts of the Russian Empire. In the 19th and 20th centuries, Russians were populating parts of Kazakhstan and northern Kyrgyzstan. There were Yehowists among settlers who discovered that new places provide more religious freedom than they had in Russian regions.

== During the Soviet period ==
Ilyinites took the revolution of 1917 indifferently, because their teaching prohibited them from taking action in military clashes and killing. However, Ilyinites expected to get more religious freedom after the revolution. In 1939, a secret center of Ilyinites was discovered and closed by the NKVD in Nizhny Tagil city in Ural. During the Soviet period, Ilyinites had to hide their activity. Some of them were persecuted, arrested, and had their religious literature confiscated. Quite often, young men refused to serve in the army, which resulted in criminal prosecution and, in some cases, capital punishment. Nevertheless, Yehowists kept on distributing Ilyin's booklets, which were printed secretly, written by hand, or copied with copying paper. Yehowists are not a registered organization, believing that there is no need to get registered with the authorities that belong to Satan. Religious publications about Yehowists made during the Soviet period were scarce and contained incorrect data about Yehowists. They stated that Ilyinites ceased to exist as a religious movement and also tried to represent Yehowists as part of or a branch of Jehovah's Witnesses.

== Today ==
The Yehowist Movement (frequently referred to by its members as Brotherhood) continues to exist in parts of the former Soviet Union, particularly in Kazakhstan, Kyrgyzstan, Southern Russia, and Ukraine. Most Yehowists are ethnic Russians, although the percentage of non-Russian members is growing due to conversion. The period is characterized by new forms of distribution of religious literature. In particular, Ilyinites actively use the internet to translate Ilyin's works to other languages. Yehowists run a multilingual website offering Russian originals, intended for the public at large, and English, German, Hebrew, Greek, Polish, and Kyrgyz translations. Invitations to visit the site are posted periodically on forums and other sites in the Russian segment of the internet.

The Yehowist population is small, and there are no accurate estimates of the number of Yehowists because it is a closed religious group. Ilyinites never provide any information about their population or about the internal life and activity of their communities. Their population is believed to grow due to proselytism.

== Theology ==
Ilyin's teaching focuses on aspects such as the 1,000-year kingdom, the physical immortality of man, and the upcoming battle between Yehowah and Satan at Armageddon. Although Ilyin was a proponent of polytheism, he focused on two Gods: Yehowah and Satan. According to Ilyin, these two Gods, called "ManGods," are of equal strength in the Solar System. There are other Gods outside the Earth and the Solar System, but they are not empowered to deal with earthly people and should not be worshiped. Of Yehowah, Ilyin stated that "...[he is] THE ONLY GOD over people, and HE is the only ONE, who has keys to death and graves... and HE is the only ONE, whom we should worship and pray about everything..." Gods, like people, exist in human form. Yehowism denies the existence of a soul, paradise, and hell in their modern interpretation. For this reason, Yehowah is often called a mangod in Ilyin's works. According to Ilyin, "Yehowah is a man and even a Hebrew but the EVERLASTING ONE..." Yehowah is God of the immortals while Satan is God of the mortals or satanists, meaning the followers of traditional Christian denominations and Talmudic Judaism. Ilyin wrote, "my GOD walks on Earth, and visits HIS friends, and has supper with them, like HE visited Abraham and had supper with him under the oak tree, …visited Melchizedek, Job, Adam and Eve, Cain and Abel, Balaam and Mohammad." Some famous religious people of the past, according to Ilyin, were representatives of Yehowism in their time, for example, John Huss, Quaker George Fox, German mystic Jakob Böhme, Socrates, Pythagoras, Medichi, Elisabeth Kridner, Muhammad, Confucius, and many others. Yehowah, according to Ilyin, is Jesus. Jesus Christ was a temporary incarnation of Yehowah on Earth. So it was the Hebrew God Yehowah himself who was crucified and died on the cross. Yehowists deny the Trinity, believing it to be Satan's fiction.

Yehowah and Satan lead an ongoing fight with each other. Yehowists fight for Yehowah by distributing Ilyin's works and following the moral and ritual norms of Yehowism. In reward, they will get eternal life in physical form. A decisive battle will soon take place between the two Gods, which Ilyin calls Armageddon. Yehowah will win and build a 1,000-year Jerusalem Republic. This will be a period of abundance for people. After 1,000 years, Satan will break free and the last battle with Yehowah will take place, in which Satan and his followers will be exterminated utterly. Then Yehowah will renew the Earth drastically and will keep on improving it periodically.

Ilyin never set any particular dates for Armageddon, foretelling forthcoming apocalyptic events rather than their dates: "[Satan] will force all people to bow to its vicious power and for cannon fodder causing a lot of suffering and bloodshed; especially it will kill brutally lot of people in the Turkish empire, Balkan Peninsula, Jerusalem and in the Caucasus." In another booklet he says: "first, [i.e. before the tribulation] YEHOWAH will bring down cannon fire on Germany."

The goal of every person on this planet, according to Ilyin, is to achieve physical immortality through self-perfection, observing Yehowah's Law and his last-days commands given through Ilyin.

== Revered books ==
Yehowists believe that the text of the Christian (and Jewish) Bible was distorted by Satan. Although they agree that the Bible contains some truths, they believe its text is so distorted that Yehowists do not use it at all, believing that the reader will not be able to tell the truth from later Satan's distortions and additions. Although Ilyin's works contain numerous references to the Bible, members of the Yehowist society are not allowed to read it or the scriptures of other religions. Yehowists believe the Ilyin-edited version of Book of Revelation, which they call the Book from Heaven, to be the holiest book. This book is considered secret and available to members of the Yehowist society only. Apart from the Book from Heaven, Ilyin's works are also regarded as holy writings. They are divided into several types depending on the creation period and purpose. Some books written by Ilyin are considered to be out of date, intended mainly for members of the organization. Works written during the initial period are known to be materials for distribution, which are distributed to propagate Ilyin's teaching. All works by Ilyin are reproduced by Yehowists both in printed and handwritten forms, with the old Russian spelling kept to avoid distortions when reproducing them. Below is a list of booklet titles:

1. Universal Theological Truth
2. Inviting all mortal people to become immortal
3. Second address by Messenger of YEHOWAH
4. Disproving all religions

Handing out booklets is the only allowed method of propagation of the teaching; verbal preaching is prohibited. Nikolai Ilyin prohibited his followers from preaching verbally based on the prophecy in Isaiah 41-25 "...he will do it the way that no one will hear him preaching a sermon nor breaking a bruised reed in the street". In addition, preaching may easily lead to debate with members of other religions. Preaching is also believed to have the possibility of distorting the message. Booklets are handed out to all people who are willing to take them.

== Worship and traditions ==
Yehowist worship takes place during closed meetings, available to members of the society. The meetings are likely to include prayers, singing, reading Holy Scriptures, and burning incense. Yehowists use a book of hymns written by Ilyin for singing both at worship meetings and at informal meetings.

Like in Judaism, Saturday is a day of rest. As such, Yehowist worship meetings take place on Saturdays, starting from Friday night. Unlike Judaism, observing Saturday is not so strict. Saturday is the only religious festivity of Yehowists. Celebration of Christmas, Easter, and other traditional Christian religious celebrations is not allowed. However, Yehowists use common and personal celebrations like the New Year and birthdays for informal meetings.

Yehowists strictly follow a food diet, which in general is similar to the Jewish one. In particular, eating pork, hare, and other seafood is strictly forbidden.

Yehowists do not serve in the army and do not take part in military actions. As a whole the moral rules they preach are universal. They condemn hatred, unjustness, lie, slander, theft, alcohol, smoking, and other vices.

== Attitude to education ==
Yehowists value secular education. Ilyin repeatedly emphasized that his message is first of all intended for educated people. In reality, the majority of Ilyinites do not hold academic degrees, which is mainly caused by persecution by the authorities as well as limited capabilities for getting an education, especially in rural areas. There are no restrictions for getting education, including higher degrees, excluding theological, legal, military, and theatrical degrees which are regarded by Ilyin as Satan's sciences.

== Attitude to other religions ==
Yehowism claims to be the only true religion of God Yehowah. Consequently, other religions are considered to be false or deluded. Participation in worship and even visiting religious buildings of other religions is prohibited. Although Ilyin praised some religious leaders and followers of the past such as Quakers, Novgorod Strigolniki, and others, Ilyin criticized other religions in his writings, especially traditional Christian denominations and Talmudic Judaism.

== Criticism ==
Yehowists are often criticized for expressing hatred and being intolerant of other religions. Indeed, a number of sayings by Ilyin contain keen criticism towards them and are not ethically acceptable. However, despite severe criticism of other religions and ideologies Yehowism is friendly to people practicing them. Ilyin repeatedly called on his followers to get along with all people regardless of their beliefs and perception. Ilyin's style is characterized by a certain degree of rudeness and straightforwardness. This might easily astonish and even shock readers, who have never read similar ideas. Disrespect to the Bible, Christian sacred objects and mysteries, the Talmud, and so on shown by Ilyin in his writings also might drive away and insult members of traditional religions.
