= Gotthard Johann von Knorring =

Russian general of Baltic German origin (1744–1825)

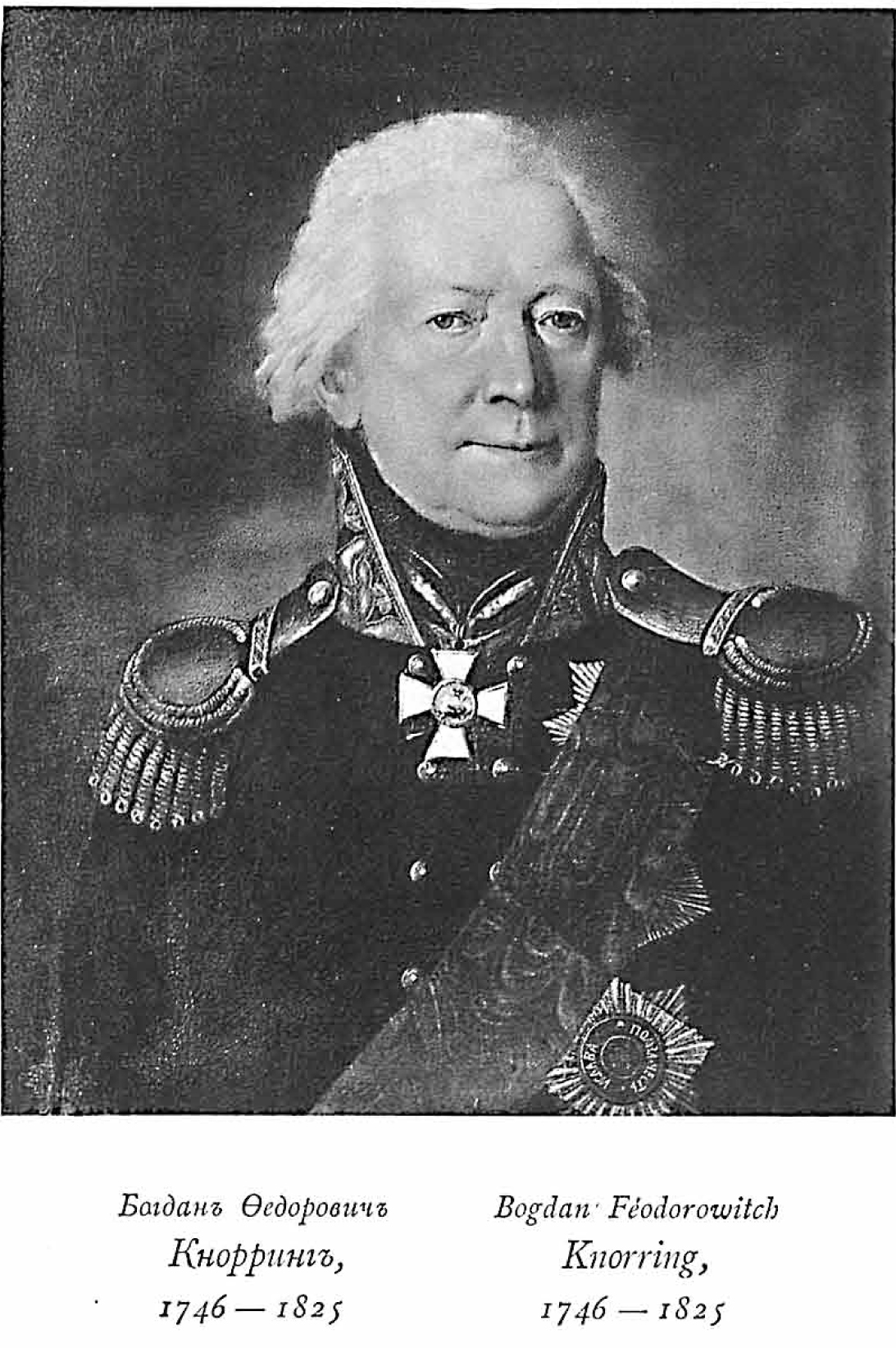
- Born: 1744 or 1746; Ervita
- Died: 17 December 1825; Dorpat
- Relatives: Karl Knorring (brother)
- Military career
- Rank: General
- Conflicts: Russo-Swedish War (1788–1790); Polish–Russian War of 1792

Gotthard Johann von Knorring (Russian: Богдан Фёдорович Кнорринг, romanized: Bogdan Fyodorovich Knorring; 1744/1746 – 17 December 1825) was a Russian general of Baltic German descent

== Biography ==
He was born in 1744 or 1746 into the Knorring family, as a member of the Baltic German nobility. Knorring grew up on Ervita manor, in the Governorate of Estonia. He was appointed general quartermaster in 1788 and had active duty during the war against Sweden (1788–1790). In 1792–1794, he participated in the campaigns in Poland–Lithuania (see Polish–Russian War of 1792 and Kościuszko Uprising). When Paul I started his reign, Knorring withdrew from the military for some years. He participated in the war against France in 1807 but was recalled due to disagreements with the commanding general, Levin August von Bennigsen. In December 1808 he was appointed commander of the Russian forces in Finland after Friedrich Wilhelm von Buxhoeveden, and under his command the Russian forces crossed the Gulf of Bothnia on the ice and invaded Sweden proper. Shortly after, in March 1809 the command of the Russian forces transferred to Michael Andreas Barclay de Tolly. He died in 1825.

== See also ==
There was another General Knorring, his brother Karl Knorring, who was involved in the Russian annexation of Georgia in 1801.
