= Campaign of Dobruja =

1809 military operations fought during the 1806-1812 Russo-Turkish War

- Part of the Russo-Turkish War (1806–1812)
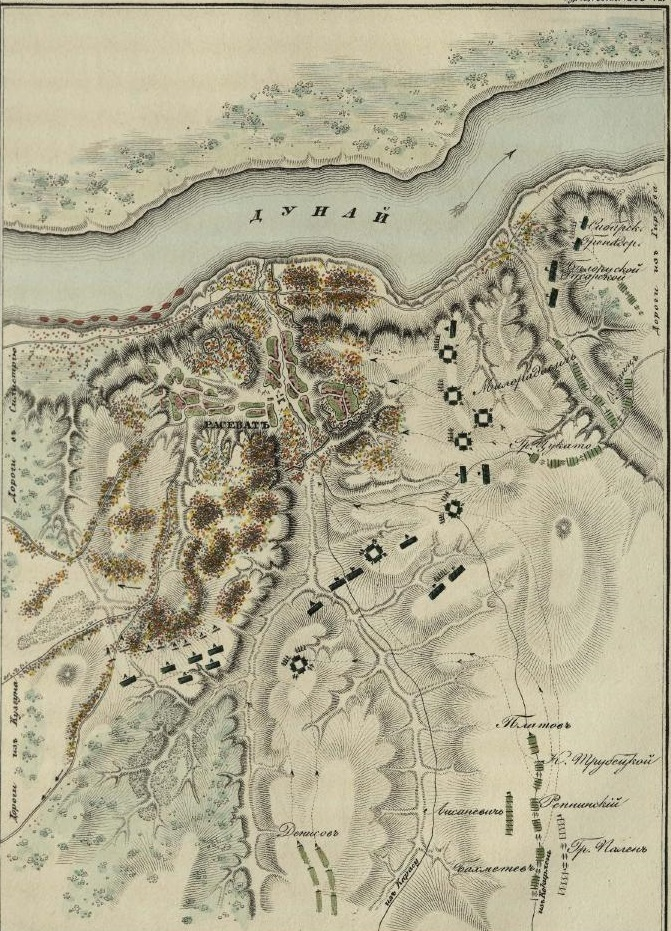
- Battle of Rassowa
Date	8 April 1809 – 4 September 1809
Location	Dobruja, Wallachia

Belligerents
Russian Empire	Ottoman Empire

Commanders and leaders
(Russian Empire) Mikhail Kutuzov (Russian Empire) Alexander Prozorovsky (Russian Empire) Pyotr Bagration	(Ottoman Empire) Mehmed Pasha (Ottoman Empire) Pehlivan Ibragim Pasha (Ottoman Empire) Seyyid Abdurrahman Pasha of Erzurum

Strength
42,000 soldiers	24,000 soldiers

Casualties and losses
2,229 killed 2,550 wounded or 9,000 total casualties	4,000 killed 1,000 captured

The Campaign of Dobruja was a conflict during the Russo-Turkish War, fought from April 8 to September 4, 1809, between the Russian Empire and the Ottoman Empire.

== Events ==
The Russian command's plan for the 1809 campaign was to capture Turkish fortresses in the lower reaches of the Danube, cross the Danube, and transfer hostilities to its right bank. The commander-in-chief of the Russian Moldavian Army, Alexander Prozorovsky, decided to take the fortresses by storm, but the assaults of Giurgiu and Brăila ended in heavy defeats.

Meanwhile, the Tsar demanded decisive action. However, the elderly and sick commander-in-chief confronted him with various reasons for the impossibility of crossing the Danube earlier in the fall. Pyotr Bagration was then sent to assist Prozorovsky.

At the end of July, the corps of General Grigory Zass crossed the Danube at Galați and then captured Isaccea and Tulcea without firing a single shot. The vanguard of Ataman M.I. Platov entered Babadag, after which the main forces moved to the right bank of the Danube. On August 9, Prince Prozorovsky died, and command of the army passed to Bagration. The ease of crossing the Lower Danube was explained by the small number of Ottoman troops stationed there, since the vizier moved his main forces to Serbia in early May. At that time, Prozorovsky recognized the possibility of separating only Isaev's three-thousand-strong detachment to help the Serbs, who were soon forced to return to Wallachia.

At this time, Serbia was subjected to a terrible defeat, and the inhabitants fled in droves to Austrian borders. After the main forces of Prince Bagration crossed the Danube, the corps of General A.F. Langeron was left in Greater Wallachia, and at Buzău the corps of P.K. Essen intended to support, if necessary, Russian troops in Bessarabia. Bagration, having ascertained the weakness of the enemy on the Lower Danube, decided to try to capture Silistra, towards which he began to advance on August 14, and a few days after that, the detachments of General Markov and Platov captured Măcin and Hârșova.

Meanwhile, subsidies from Britain significantly strengthened the Ottoman army, and Kör Yusuf, the Grand vizier, intended to take advantage of the removal of the main Russian forces to the Lower Danube, to invade Wallachia, capture Bucharest and thereby force Bagration to retreat to the left bank of the Danube. In the second half of August, he began to transport his troops near Giurgiu. Having learned about this Langeron decided, despite the insignificance of his forces, to go to meet the Ottomans and ordered General Essen, who had moved to Obilești, to join him. On August 29, 9.6 km (6.0 mi) from Giurgiu near the village of Frasine, they attacked the Ottoman vanguard and defeated it. Meanwhile, the vizier himself, receiving alarming news from near Silistra, did not move from Giurgiu.

== Siege of Brăila ==
On April 8, Infantry General M.I. Kutuzov's corps approached Brăila. On April 11, a river squadron of 22 ships under the command of Akimov arrived from Galați and, standing near Brăila, began bombarding him. The siege artillery arrived the same day. The castle was surrounded. During the night between April 12 and April 20, Russian troops built parallels, communication routes, trenches, redoubts, and batteries. The Russians began a bombardment of Turkish positions, but "[the Russian's] structures were so far away that the fire from our batteries could do nothing against the earthen hoards and huge rounds, each of which was nearly the size of a fortress."

On April 13, the Turks launched an offensive and attacked the right flank of the Russian positions, but the attack was repelled with heavy losses.

Deciding to attack Brăila, Prozorovsky instructed General Kutuzov to prepare a regulation, and Kutuzov handed over this matter to Lieutenant Colonel of the General Staff K.F. Toll for execution. The attack was supposed to be at night, and it would be a surprise to the enemy. The assault detachment (18 battalions, 7,000 soldiers in total) was divided into three columns. At 11 p.m. on April 20, the troops moved to the ramparts of the fortress. The column led by Prince V.V. Vyazemsky lost its way in the darkness, "almost all fell into the cellars of the burnt houses and, mistaking them for the moat of the fortress, began to shoot and became completely upset, not even reaching the moat. They began to put up ladders, but they turned out to be too short." Russian soldiers were subjected to devastating shooting by the besieged Turks. In the 13th Jaeger Regiment, out of 1,100 people, about 900 soldiers and officers were killed and wounded.

The attacking battalions of the remaining two columns, S. Y. Repninsky and N. Z. Khitrovo, having rushed forward, went down into the ditch and opened fire: "they shot in the air and at each other, wasting cartridges and stupidly shouting hurray!" On alarm, the Turks hastily took their places and, with volleys in the light of burning torches and tarred barrels, they met the assailants. The Russian attack faltered, the soldiers, "falling into deep ditches; they were not only unable to attack, but even to get out of the ditches; they died without being able to defend themselves or defeat their enemies." "General Essen 3rd was ordered to make a false attack on [the Russian] left flank, but he did not have ladders."

The assault ended only at 11 a.m., lasting 12 hours. "No one dared to tell Prozorovsky that he had to retreat; Finally, Kutuzov informed him that the assault had been repulsed. Prozorovsky ordered a retreat. To cover the retreat, he ordered fire from all batteries, so there was no pursuit. Only on the left flank did the Turks pursue Repninsky's column, but were repulsed." During the assault, Russian troops lost 2,229 killed and 2,550 wounded.

The unsuccessful assault caused a loss of morale among the troops. On May 7, Prozorovsky lifted the siege of Brăila and stopped active operations. Having sent the wounded and sick to the hospital and lifted the siege, the army retreated across the Siret River, where it set up camp; the main apartment was located in Galați.

== Rassowa ==
On September 2, Bagration set out for Cernavodă to unite with Miloradovich's troops, where Turkish troops were gathered at Rassevat (Rassowa). According to Bagration's attack plan, Miloradovich's corps was to launch a frontal attack, while Platov's corps was to cut off Hüsrev Pasha's road to Silistra.

On September 4, Russian troops approached Rassevat. The Turks did not expect large forces of the Russian army to approach here due to the terrain conditions. While Bagration deployed only the cavalry high against the Turkish camp, the main forces were looking for temporary solutions. The Turks discovered the Russian vanguard and opened artillery fire on them. At the same time, a significant mass of Turkish cavalry moved along the coastal road towards Chernovody to attack the flank of Miloradovich's corps. Advance Russian troops began to clash with the Turks, which involved the reorganization of the main forces. Miloradovich repelled the attack of the Turkish cavalry and turned into four squares. He stopped 400 fathoms – 2,400 ft (0.45 mi; 0.73 km) – from the Turkish positions and opened artillery fire on them. Bagration sent Denisov's detachment of 600 men to bypass the Turks' left flank to block the road to Silistra. The appearance of Denisov's detachment forced the Turks to hastily retreat; Bagration ordered his cavalry to pursue the Turks. Trubetskoy's square occupied the camp abandoned by the Turks, and the entire cavalry force was sent to pursue the Turks. The defeat of Hüsrev Pasha was complete, and the Russians pursued the fleeing Turks for 20 miles (32 km).

The vizier sent 15,000 men to aid the Turkish troops, but when the Turks learned of the defeat, they turned back.

== See also ==
- Siege of Brăila
- Black Sea
- Danube Delta

== Sources ==
- Записки графа Ланжерона. Война с Турцией 1806—1812 г.г. «Русская Старина», март 1908 года
- А. Н. Петров. Война России с Турцией 1806—1812 гг. Том II. Тип. В. С. Балашева. — СПб. 1887, 587 с.
- Хронологический указатель военных действий русской армии и флота, 1801—1825 гг. Т. II. — СПб.: Тип. «Бережливость», 1909.
- Андрей Николаевич Петров. Война России с Турцией 1806-1812 гг. Том II. Тип. В.С. Балашева. — СПб. 1887, 587 с.
- Хронологический указатель военных действий русской армии и флота, 1801–1825 гг. Т. II. — СПб.: Тип. «Бережливость», 1909.
- Andrei Nikolaevich Petrov, Война России с Турцией 1806-1812 гг. Том II. стр. 354—359
- Alexander Mikhailovsky-Danilevsky, Описание Турецкой войны в царствование императора Александра, с 1806 до 1812 года: [В 2-х ч.] / по высочайшему повелению сочиненное генерал-лейтенантом и членом Военного совета Михайловским-Данилевским. — СПб.: Тип. Штаба отд. Корпуса внутренней стражи. 1843. — Ч. 2. — 1843. — [4], 279 c.; 17 л. карт, план. стр. 201—205
- "Рассеват". Brockhaus and Efron Encyclopedic Dictionary: In 86 Volumes (82 Volumes and 4 Additional Volumes) (in Russian). St. Petersburg: F. A. Brockhaus. 1890–1907.
