= Konstantin Mikhailovich Bazili =

Nineteenth century Russian historian

- Константи́н Миха́йлович Бази́ли
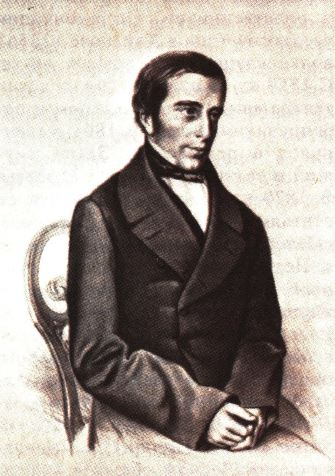
- Born: 3 or 15 February 1809; Istanbul
- Died: 10 or 22 February 1884; Odesa

Konstantin Mikhailovich Bazili (Russian: Константи́н Миха́йлович Бази́ли; 3 February 1809 – 10 February 1884) was a Russian historian, writer and Orientalist of Greek origin.

K. Basili finished his book "Syria and Palestine Under Turkish Rule" in Saint Elias Monastery in Lebanon, where he used to spend his time on holidays.
