= Nikolai Ilyin (Yehowist) =

Nikolai Sazontovich Ilyin (also spelled Il'in) (1809–1890) – a Russian retired military officer, writer and religious thinker, in the 1840s founded and led an apocalyptic millenarian movement of Yehowists (Russian: Еговисты), or Yehowists-Ilyinites that has survived in parts of the former Soviet Union up to this day.

== Ilyin's Early Years ==
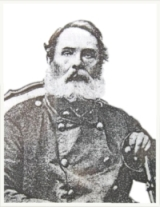
Nikolai Ilyin (1809—1890)

Ilyin was born in 1809 in Astrakhan, South Russia. He was educated in a Jesuit college and a military school in St. Petersburg. By 1840 Nikolai Ilyin became an active correspondent for a new magazine called Maiak (The Lighthouse). The magazine maintained to a certain degree the mystical tendencies of the famous Sionsky Vestnik (The Herald of Zion) published by Aleksandr Labzin (1776-1825), a freemason and mystic. The Herald of Zion was published during the reign of Alexander I, a monarch known for his liberal and lenient politics towards religious free thought and dissent. Nikolai Ilyin read Sionskii Vestnik and the ideas of the universal brotherhood of all men, a mystical core common to all faiths and the focus on personal spirituality as opposed to external forms, appealed to him. Ideas of the German mystic Johann Heinrich Jung also played a very important role in shaping Ilyin’s worldview.

Ilyin, as many other Christian mystics, turned to the most symbolic text of the New Testament, the Book of Revelation, and thoroughly studyied commentaries on the text. This caused Ilyin to revise his views on church and Christianity and ultimately led to his decision to leave Orthodoxy. Deep personal experiences and insights of religious nature gradually led him away from the strictly Orthodox way of thinking, and his initially eclectic world view evolved into a specific doctrine.

In 1846 Ilyin was transferred to Ekaterinburg and, in the following year, to the nearby settlement of Barancha. Around 1850 Ilyin began to write his first decidedly non-Orthodox book, Sionskaia vest’ (The Message of Zion). The book that Ilyin called his Good News (Благовест, Blagovest), contained a teaching of a coming battle between God and Satan and the division of people between “those of the right hand” and “those of the left hand”, an allusion to verses of Matthew (25:32, 33). The essence of the true religion, according to Ilyin, was Love alone, not any external forms of worship or rituals. The law of Love, common for the ancient Hebrew prophets and the teachings of Jesus Christ, would be a foundation for the unification of faiths. Although Ilyin primarily strove for the unification of Christians and Jews, his call for unity was likewise directed to Muslims, who are also descendants of Abraham. Desnoe Bratstvo (literally “Brotherhood of those of the Right Hand”, sometimes translated by Western researches as The Righteous Brotherhood) became an initial name of their group used by Ilyin and his friends.

== Imprisonment (1859–1879) ==
The civil and ecclesiastical authorities became aware of the new dissenter movement. Nikolai Ilyin and his followers were arrested and came to trial in 1859. As a result, Ilyin was found guilty and sent to Solovetsky Monastery in the North of Russia “for the purposes of spiritual correction”. A number of Ilyin’s friends and sympathizers were demoted, transferred to remote areas or rebuked for their association with the heresy.

Ilyin’s sojourn in the monastery did not differ much from imprisonment. Although the Solovki was the largest site of monastic confinement in Russia, more than a dozen monasteries throughout the country were used as places of the “spiritual correction”. Prugavin wrote, quoting one of the former prisoners of the Solovki, that the Solovki prison was a truly unbearable place. Windows would not open and it was hard to breathe; food was very bad and the prisoners were happy when they were given fresh bread. Inmates could not use candles even during long northern nights. The internal policies of the prison forbade any contacts between inmates and outsiders without explicit permission of the abbot (arkhimandrit). Any letter exchange, parcel delivery, or money delivery was also forbidden, among other restrictions.

Ilyin could not leave the monastery, receive visitors (even family members), interact with other inmates, deliberately choose books for reading, or freely exchange correspondence with anyone. He was required to listen to the admonitions the monks gave him in order to make him repent. After many unsuccessful petitions Ilyin’s daughter Natalia received permission to visit her father in 1868. After a week’s stay in the monastery with the father, the young woman returned with gray hair.

Although the access of visitors to the inmates of the Solovki monastic prison was forbidden, a British journalist, historian, and traveller William Hepworth Dixon managed to arrange for a short meeting with Nikolai Ilyin some time in the 1860s on his extensive travel across Russia. This is how Dixon describes Ilyin: “An aged, handsome man, like Kossuth in appearance, starts astonished from his seat; unused, as it would seem, to such disturbance of his cell. A small table, a few books, a pallet bed, are the only furnishings of his room, the window of which is ribbed and crossed with iron… A table holds some scraps of books and journals; the prisoner being allowed, it seems, to receive such things from the outer world, though he is not permitted to send out a single line of writing.”

Dixon even attempted petitioning on behalf of the prisoner, but his plea was turned down upon examining Ilyin’s dossier by the Russian Ministry of Interior, who replied to Dixon: “Yet men like Nicolas Ilyin are the salt of the earth; men who will go through fire and water for their thought; men who would live a true life in a dungeon rather than a false life in the richest mansions of the world!”

In 1873 Ilyin was transferred to Spaso-Evfimiev Monastery in Suzdal, which was the second largest monastic prison in Russia, because his health was deteriorating quickly in the very cold and humid climate of Solovki. Ilyin spent a total of 20 years (1859–1879) in monastic confinement. In spite of the strict control, he used every opportunity to write and communicate with his followers and continued writing when he could. A major work written by Nikolai Ilyin in the monastery is called Luch sveta dlia rassveta (A Ray of Light for the Dawn). The book consists of nine parts and is devoted to a wide range of doctrinal and practical questions, from apocalyptic prophecies to the internal structure and code of conduct for the members of the Righteous Brotherhood. In fact, it was from about the time of his transfer from Suzdal that Ilyin began calling his fellow-believers Yehowists.

Towards the end of the 1870s, Ilyin's health deteriorated. He suffered from severe headaches and nervous exhaustion. Once a nurse applied a leech so close to Ilyin’s eye that the eye flew out. Under those circumstances, Ilyin’s family and friends resumed petitioning on his behalf, and, finally, in July 1879, Ilyin was set free and ordered to settle in a village called Palangen in the predominantly Lutheran Kurland province (now Latvia) with the specific purpose to prevent Ilyin from spreading his views among the Orthodox population. A little later Ilyin got the permission to move to the town of Mitau (now Jelgava, Latvia) of the same province.

== Last Years of Ilyin (1879 – 1890) ==
Liberation of the leader led to a certain revival among the Yehowists in the Urals. New pamphlets were coming to Barancha, Nizhnii Tagil and other Ural towns, while money gathered by the Yehowists was being sent to Mitau as Ilyin’s financial situation after his liberation was critical. Letters of Ilyin to his followers in different places of the Empire show that the amount of single-time donations sent to Mitau ranged anywhere from modest two rubles to fifty rubles (an average monthly salary of a factory worker at that time) depending on the size and material well-being of the Yehowist group that made donations. Ilyin tried to re-distribute money flows so that isolated and poor Yehowists could get subsistence. He also urged local leaders to create monetary trusts and common treasuries to help the neediest of the brethren.

Ilyin continued writing books and sending them to his followers in the Urals and to a number of actual and potential readers throughout the Empire and abroad. Many of his writings of that time concluded with invitations to contact the author with any questions or should readers need more copies. Already in Ilyin’s lifetime communities of Yehowists were founded in the North Caucasus (Pyatigorsk) and Transcaucasian regions, while isolated families and individual believers could be found in many provinces of the Russian Empire. His followers were fervently distributing the booklets, making converts among the factory workers and others, and annoying local authorities.

A new trial of the Yehowists-Ilyinites began in Ekaterinburg in 1886. In 1887, Ilyin was arrested again and sent to Ekaterinburg to appear before the court, since all other convicts resided in that area. About two months later, on August 30, 1887, Ilyin was set free on bail. He took advantage of his unexpected freedom and went to Nizhnii Tagil and Barancha to visit and encourage his friends. This sudden visit led to an outburst of joy and optimistic expectations among the followers of Ilyin, quite depressed by the trial and arrests of many of their number. Yehowists hoped their brethren would be freed soon. In fact, however, Ilyin was arrested again on September 13 as the authorities knew he was encouraging the sectarians and holding meetings with them, and he was put back into the Ekaterinburg prison.

Nikolai Ilyin underwent a medical checkup in January 1888, and was found not fit for any further court proceedings. The trial was suspended until his recovery. Ilyin was sent back to Mitau early in 1889 and immediately put under strict police surveillance. Upon his return to Kurland Ilyin resumed writing and mailing out his brochures in spite of his fragile health. No recovery followed, though. Nikolai Ilyin died in Mitau on July 3, 1890. The place of his burial is unknown.

== The Yehowist Movement After Ilyin ==
The religious movement of Yehowists is still active in parts of the former USSR. They continue distributing the message of Nikolai Ilyin through printed and electronic media. The latter, for instance, include a multi-language Yehowist website.
