= Åland Offensive =

1809 battle of the Finnish War

- Part of the Finnish War
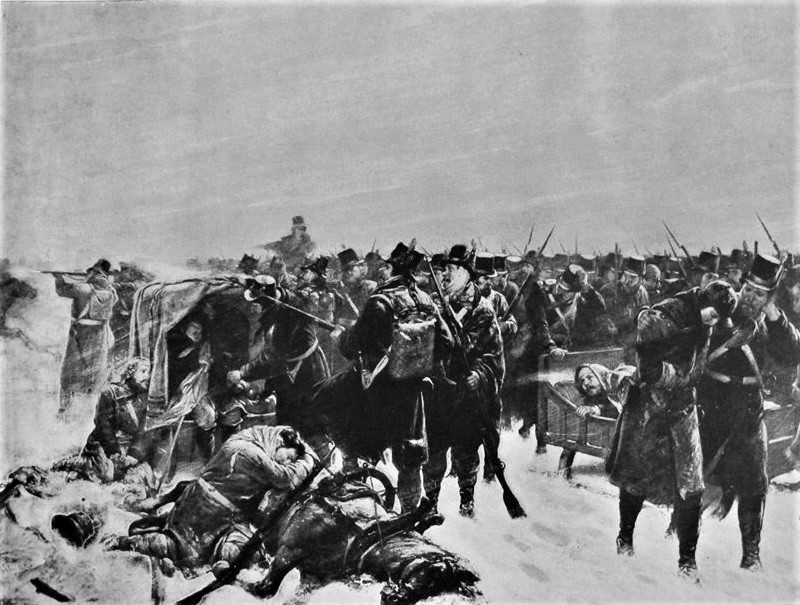
- The Swedish retreat from Åland, by August Malmström
| Date | 10–21 March 1809 |
| Location | Åland, Swedish Finland |
| Result | Convention of Åland (See Aftermath) |

Belligerents
| Sweden | Russian Empire |

Commanders and leaders
| Georg Carl von Döbeln | (Russian Empire) Gotthard Johann von Knorring |

Strength
| 6,000 (including many sick soldiers) | 17,000 |

Casualties and losses
| 1,750 captured (including around 1,150 sick and frostbitten, who were left behind in the retreat) | 20–30 killed or wounded |

The Åland Offensive was part of a threefold attack on native Sweden by the Russian Empire during the Finnish War, to force Sweden into the Continental System and to give up Finland. Åland was to be used for an immediate attack on Stockholm. Only minor skirmishes occurred when Gotthard Johann von Knorring launched his Åland offensive on 10 March 1809, since the Swedes under Georg Carl von Döbeln quickly withdrew over the ice to Stockholm. Although suffering heavy casualties, the Swedish army had escaped destruction. The concluding Convention of Åland not only brought an end to the Russian offensive, but led to their withdrawal from the islands.

== Background ==
After the Russian conquest of Finland, the Swedish king Gustav IV Adolf was deposed in a coup, while the Russians planned a large offensive against native Sweden to enforce peace; Sweden would enter the Continental System and accept the Russian annexation of Finland. Accordingly, the Russian emperor Alexander I of Russia ordered a threefold attack that would go over the ice to Åland and Stockholm, over the ice of Kvarken, and over the Torne. The Swedes had just over 6,000 men (including sick) under general Georg Carl von Döbeln defending Åland and the path to Stockholm, while the Russians under supreme commander Gotthard Johann von Knorring mustered about 17,000 men in their offensive of the islands.

== Offensive ==
The first Russian columns started moving on 10 March and reached Kumlinge on the 13th. The Cossacks attacked a Swedish outpost on Vårdö the next day. Döbeln was initially determined to face the Russians on the islands, but changed his mind after receiving words of the coup the same day; the great disparity in numbers between the two forces was a contributing factor. On 16 March, after a few minor skirmishes and fruitless negotiations, with the Russians advancing over Vårdö and the Föglö archipelago to encircle the Swedes, von Döbeln decided to retreat. The Swedish vanguard set out from Eckerö towards Stockholm already the same day, bringing with them a transport of sick soldiers.

The bulk of the army marched out the next day, during a blizzard, with the battalions formed into squares in which the baggage and sick soldiers were escorted. A lot of supplies, provisions and sick soldiers were left behind due to the lack of horses. The Russians advanced rapidly during this time; a cavalry attack by Yakov Kulnev was repulsed by the Swedish rearguard-division. However, the Södermanland battalion at Signilskär (475 men) and 87 Fleetwood jägers who were ordered to fight a delaying action, were cut-off and forced to surrender. On 18 March, the bulk of the Swedish forces reached Grisslehamn on the Swedish mainland after having marched for 45–50 km (28–31 mi).

== Aftermath ==
The Swedish army had managed to avoid destruction, but at a very high cost; about 1,750 men were lost—almost all captured—of which more than 1,100 sick and frostbitten were left behind on the islands and on the march towards Grisslehamn. The Russians had suffered no more than 20–30 killed and wounded. Since the Swedish army still posed a threat, the Russians disregarded an immediate offensive towards Stockholm to enforce peace as planned. Instead, only a small cavalry-division under Kulnev went after the Swedes as demonstration. The two sides soon entered negotiations, in which von Döbeln asked von Knorring to cease with further attacks as to not disrupt any peace talks.

On 21 March, the Convention of Åland was signed which, under the circumstances, was in favor of Sweden; it resulted not only in the abrupt end to the Russian offensive—against the wishes of Alexander I—but also in a general Russian withdrawal from Åland to Finland on 25 March, while von Döbeln promised not to re-occupy the islands. Following the summer campaign in Västerbotten, the war was concluded in the September Treaty of Fredrikshamn, with Åland and the rest of Finland being ceded to the Russian Empire.

== Sources ==
- Generalstaben, Krigshistoriska avdelningen (1921). Sveriges krig åren 1808 och 1809, Volume 8 (in Swedish). Stockholm: Kongl. boktryckeriet P. A. Norstedt & söner.
- Hornborg, Eirik (1955). När riket sprängdes: fälttågen i Finland och Västerbotten, 1808-1809 (in Swedish). Stockholm: P. A. Norstedts och Söners Förlag.
