= Hemvärnsmusiken =

Division of the Home Guard

- HvMus Emblem
- Active: 1940; 85 years ago
- Country: Sweden
- Branch: Swedish Armed Forces
- Type: Military department
- Role: The sponsorship of military bands
- Size: 25 bands (circa 1,200 musicians)
- Part of: Home Guard
- Headquarters: Stockholm
- Nickname(s): HvMus
- March: Home Guard March (Hemvärnets marsch) - Helge Damberg
- Anniversaries: Defense Music Day in May

Hemvärnsmusiken (English: Home Guard Music) is a division of the Home Guard that heads all 25 bands. It is led by the Home Guard's central music council and performs at 600-700 events each year. There are over 1,000 active musicians in the division. 17 bands are qualified for performance at state ceremonies, royal visits and festivities. Aside from the official bands, Home Guard Bugle Bands also are in service within their respective areas.

== History ==
The Home Guard was formed in 1940 and in May of that year. The first Home Guard Band was formed in Leksand. The number of bands grew gradually. At least about 15 bands operated during the Second World War. There was no formal status for home guard bands, with those bands often being composed of civilians. In 1943, the Stockholm Home Guard Band was formed, being the first official military band. In 1945, the first attempts were made to organize the bands, with provisions being made the provision of uniforms among others. It was not until 1974 that it was decided to form a central body to oversee the interests of the bands. This was manifested into the Home Guard's Central Music Committee (CMN).

== Goals ==
The division has to perform service music at the Home Guard and other Armed Forces activities, festivals and ceremonies as well as official state ceremonies. It is designed to promote and perpetuate Swedish military music traditions.

== Home Guard Central Music Council ==
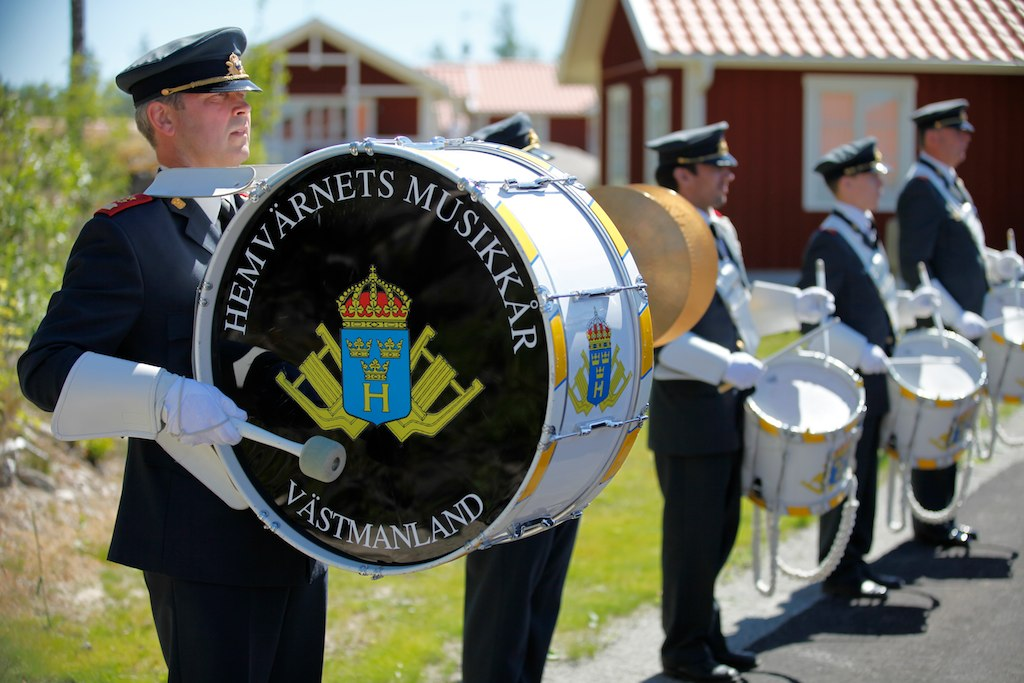
The Västmanland Home Guard Band at the opening of the Skedvistrand Holiday Village in June 2011.

The Home Guard's Central Music Council (CMR) is a permanent committee attached to the National Home Guard Council and serves as a liaison body between the National Home Guard Chief and the division. It works mainly on educational and organizational issues and also collaborates with the military hierarchy on budgetary and regulatory issues and conducts certain project activities. The CMR consists of six members elected by a Home Defense Music Meeting, as well as a member appointed by the National Chief of Home Guard.

== Symbols ==
=== Emblem ===
The division emblem was established in 1986 and is worn by all home defense musicians as a trade mark over the right chest pocket of the uniform. It is also found on sheet music ornaments and trumpet tabs. It consists of the standard weapon of the Home Guard in front of two oblique lyres in gold.

=== Uniform ===
Uniform m/1987 is the general uniform of the Home Guard. Some personnel uniforms also have a civilian design with a different name and uniform in parallel with their military function. The Uniform 90 is also worn on certain occasions. Uniforms are regulated by the Armed Forces regulations of 2015. A distinction for the uniforms of Home Guard musicians are the red shoulder flap sleeves along with the shoulder ornament.

== Organization of bands ==
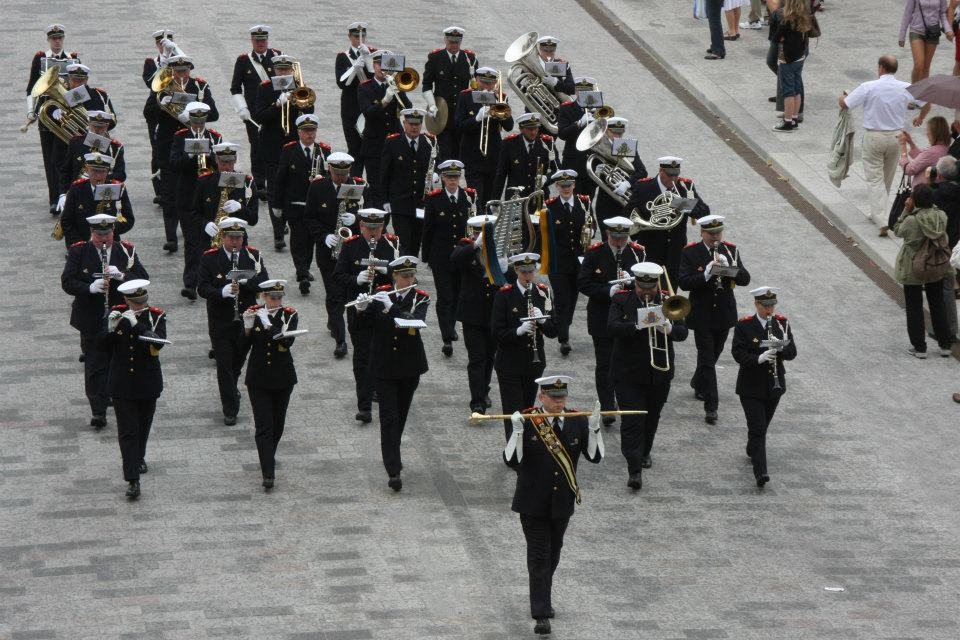
Swedish Home Guard Band of Uppsala on parade by the Royal Palace in Stockholm.

The division consists of the following units:

- Södertörn Home Guard Band
- Borås Home Guard Band
- Borlänge Home Guard Band
- BohusDal Home Guard Band
- Blekinge Home Guard Band
- Ängelholm Home Guard Band
- Ystad Home Guard Band
- Östergötland Home Guard Band
- Västmanland Home Guard Band
- Uppsala Home Guard Band
- Umeå Home Guard Band
- Skaraborg Home Guard Band
- Norrbotten Home Guard Band
- Kristianstad Home Guard Band
- Lycksele Home Guard Band
- Lund Home Guard Band
- Eksjö Home Guard Band
- Eslöv Home Guard Band
- Guldsmedshyttan Home Guard Band
- Gävle Home Guard Band
- Göteborg Home Guard Band
- Halland Home Guard Band
- Jämtland Home Guard Band
- Jönköping-Huskvarna Home Guard Band
- Kalmar län Home Guard Band

== See also ==
- Conscript Band of the Finnish Defence Forces
- Forsvarets musikk
- Swedish Armed Forces Music Corps
- Royal Life Guards Music Band (Denmark)

== Bibliography ==
- Sandberg, Bo (2007). Försvarets marscher och signaler förr och nu: marscher antagna av svenska militära förband, skolor och staber samt igenkännings-, tjänstgörings- och exercissignaler (in Swedish) (New ed.). Stockholm: Militärmusiksamfundet med Svenskt marscharkiv. ISBN 978-91-631-8699-8. SELIBR 10413065.
