= Mattias Ardin =

Swedish major general (born 1969)

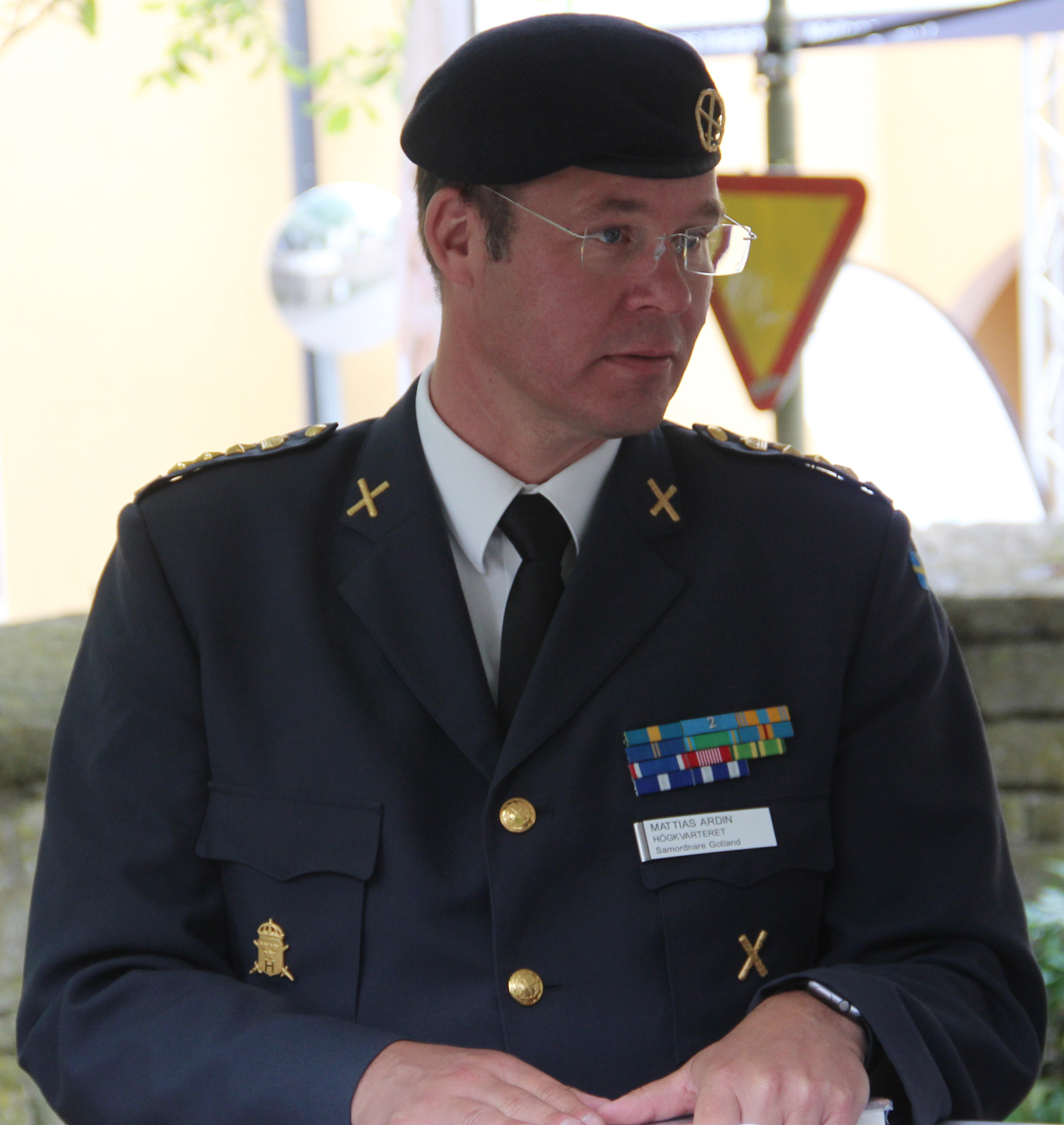
- Ardin in 2016.
- Born: Nils Tomas Mattias Lundkvist; 29 May 1969 (age 57); Stockholm, Sweden
- Military career
- Allegiance: Sweden
- Branch: Swedish Army
- Service years: 1991–present
- Rank: Major General
- Commands: Gotland Regiment; Central Military Region; Deputy Chief of Home Guard; Chief of Home Guard
- Conflicts: Post-Kosovo War (KFOR); War in Afghanistan (ISAF)

Major General Nils Tomas Mattias Ardin, né Lundkvist (born 29 May 1969) is a Swedish Army officer who has held a series of senior command and staff positions both in Sweden and on international missions. After commissioning in 1991, he spent the 1990s serving with the Gotland Anti-Aircraft Battalion, rising to the rank of captain.

In the 2000s, he gained extensive operational experience abroad, serving in Kosovo in 2004 and in Afghanistan from 2005 to 2006, including as chief of staff of the British-Swedish Provincial Reconstruction Team in Mazar-i-Sharif and later as commander of the Swedish contingent. He then held key operational staff roles at the Swedish Armed Forces Headquarters, primarily within the operations (G3) functions.

Promoted to colonel, Ardin went on to lead the National Home Guard Department from 2012 to 2016 and played a central role in the re-establishment of Swedish military presence on Gotland. He commanded the re-established Gotland Regiment from 2018 and later served as commander of the Central Military Region from 2022. In 2023, he was appointed Deputy Chief of Home Guard and promoted to brigadier general. In 2026, he became Chief of Home Guard and was promoted to major general.

== Early life ==
Ardin was born on 29 May 1969 in Skärholmen Parish in Stockholm. Ardin grew up in Visby and completed his conscript service at the Gotland Anti-Aircraft Battalion (Lv 2) in Visby. He graduated from the Military Academy Karlberg in 1991 and was commissioned that same year as a second lieutenant at the Gotland Anti-Aircraft Battalion.

== Career ==
Ardin served at the Gotland Anti-Aircraft Battalion (renamed the Gotland Anti-Aircraft Corps in 1994) for the remainder of the 1990s. He was promoted to lieutenant in 1994 and to captain in 1996. He served as head of the Planning Section on the brigade staff of the Swedish Kosovo Force in 2004, at which time he was promoted to lieutenant colonel. He was chief of staff of the British-Swedish Provincial Reconstruction Team in Mazar-i-Sharif from 2005 to 2006 during the Swedish mission in Afghanistan.

In 2006, he was head of the Swedish mission in Afghanistan, and subsequently head of the Operations Management Department (Insatsledningsavdelningen, G3) in the Army Command within the Operational Unit (Operativa enheten, OpE) at Headquarters from 2006 to 2007, and head of Ground 3 Command (G3) in the Land Component Command within the Joint Forces Command (JFC) (Insatsledningen, INS) at Headquarters from 2007 to 2008. He then served as head of the International Training Unit (Internationella utbildningsenheten, Int Utb E) at the Life Guards.

After being promoted to colonel, he served from 2012 to 2016 as head of the National Home Guard Department (Rikshemvärnsavdelningen) in the Training and Procurement Staff (Produktionsledningen) at Headquarters. Ahead of the Swedish Armed Forces re-establishing units on Gotland, Ardin served as coordinator for Gotland at the Army Department in the Training and Procurement Staff at Headquarters from 1 July to 30 September 2016, and from 1 October 2016 to 31 December 2017 as head of the "Forward Command Function Gotland."

On 1 January 2018, Ardin assumed command of the re-established Gotland Regiment. On 31 March 2022, he took up the position as commander of the Central Military Region. On 1 March 2023, he assumed the role of Deputy Chief of Home Guard and was simultaneously promoted to brigadier general. On 9 January 2026, Ardin became Chief of Home Guard and was promoted at the same time to major general.

== Dates of rank ==
- 1991 – Second lieutenant
- 1994 – Lieutenant
- 1996 – Captain
- ? – Major
- ? – Lieutenant colonel
- ? – Colonel
- 1 March 2023 – Brigadier general
- 9 January 2026 – Major general

== Awards and decorations ==
=== Swedish ===
- (Sweden) Swedish Armed Forces Conscript Medal
- (Sweden) Swedish Armed Forces International Service Medal (award numeral 2)
- (Sweden) Home Guard Medal of Merit
- (Sweden) Home Guard Bronze Medal (11 October 2014)
- (Sweden) Home Guard Petri Medal
- (Sweden) Gotland Regiment Medal of Honour
- (Sweden) Life Guards Medal of Merit III
- (Sweden) Roslagen Anti-Aircraft Corps (Lv 3) Commemorative Medal
- (Sweden) Dala Brigade Medal of Merit (Dalabrigadens förtjänstmedalj)

=== Foreign ===
- (Denmark) Home Guard Medal of Merit
- NATO Non-Article 5 medal for Kosovo
- NATO Non-Article 5 medal for ISAF

Military offices
Preceded by None	Gotland Regiment; 2018–2022	Succeeded by Magnus Frykvall
Preceded by Thomas Karlsson	Central Military Region; 2022–2023	Succeeded by Magnus Lüning
Preceded by ?	Deputy Chief of Home Guard; 2023–2026	Succeeded by ?
Preceded by Laura Swaan Wrede	Chief of Home Guard; 2026–present	Succeeded by Incumbent
