= Northern Military Region (Sweden) =

- Norra militärregionen
- Active: 2013–present
- Country: Sweden
- Allegiance: Swedish Armed Forces
- Branch: Joint
- Type: Military region
- Role: Operational, territorial and tactical activities
- Part of: Swedish Armed Forces Headquarters (Note: In the years 2013–2019, the military region staff was subordinate to the commander of Norrbotten Regiment, and since 2020 its directly subordinate to the Chief of Home Guard.)
- Garrison/HQ: Boden Garrison

Commanders
- Current commander: COL Magnus Ståhl

The Northern Military Region (Swedish: Norra militärregionen, MR N) is a Swedish military region within the Swedish Armed Forces. Established in 2013, the military region staff in based in Boden Garrison. The military region includes Norrbotten County, Västerbotten County, Jämtland County and Västernorrland County.

== History ==
The Northern Military Region was formed on 1 January 2013 as Military Region North, as one of four military regions in Sweden. The military region includes Norrbotten County, Västerbotten County, Jämtland County and Västernorrland County. The region's staff is located in Boden Garrison with the task of leading surveillance and protection tasks, implementing civil-military cooperation and support to society. The Northern Military Region is also responsible for leading the production of the training groups and the Home Guard units in Norrland. The responsibility involves both training personnel for the Home Guard units and leading them in operations. The Northern Military Region's Home Guard battalions are seven in number. On 1 October 2018, a separate command position was appointed for Military Region North. From 2019, the name Northern Military Region was adopted. From 1 January 2020, all military regions are independent units subordinate to the Chief of Home Guard. In doing so, the regions also take over the command in peacetime from the training groups with their Home Guard battalions. Each military region has production management responsibility. This meant that five training groups were transferred to the Northern Military Region. In a government's bill, however, the Swedish government emphasized that the military regional division could be adjusted, depending on the outcome of the investigation Ansvar, ledning och samordning inom civilt försvar ("Responsibility, leadership and coordination in civil defense").

== Units ==
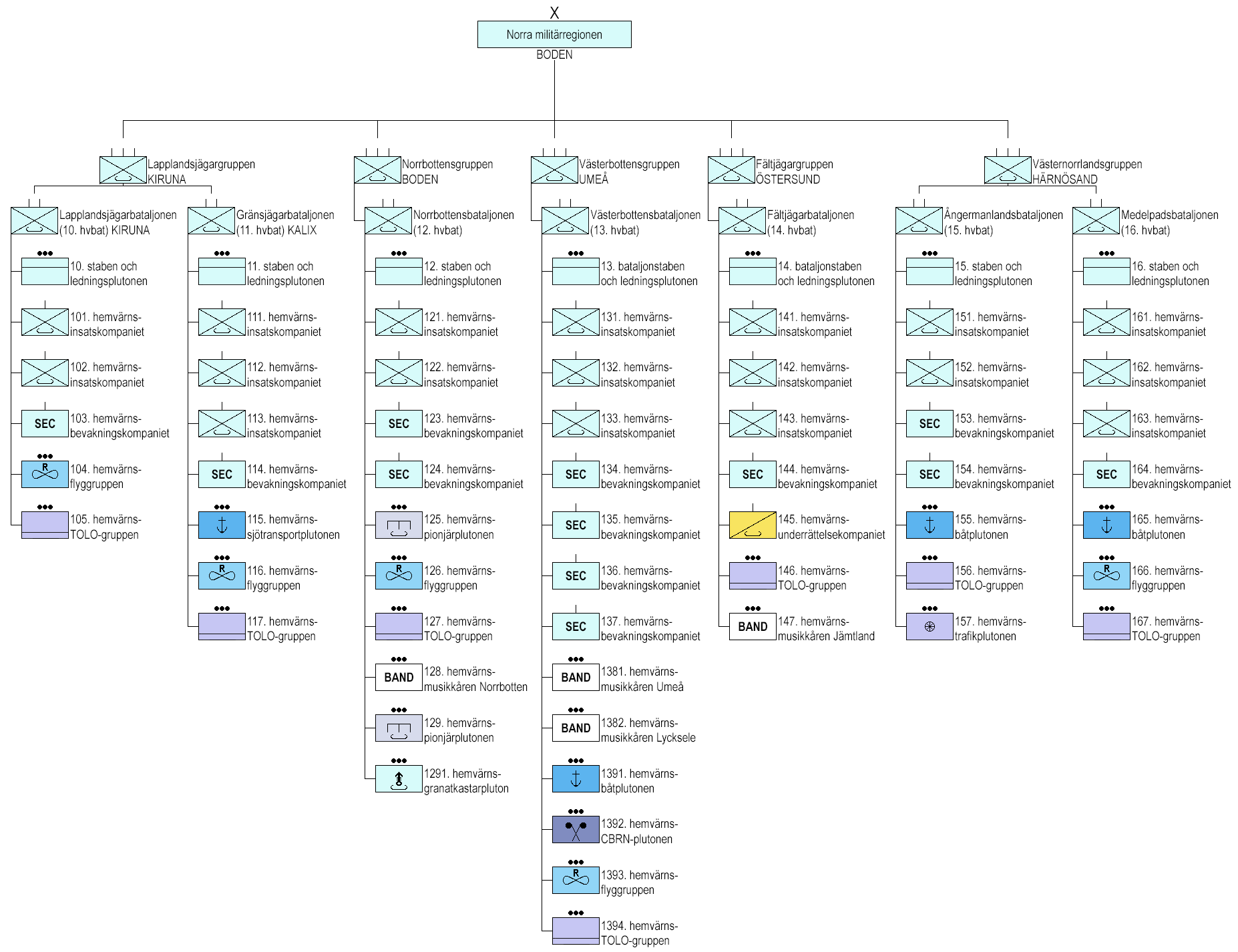
Northern Military Region organization as of April 2026 (click to enlarge)

- Lapplandsjägargruppen (LJG)
  - 10th Home Guard Battalion/Lapplandsjägar Battalion
  - 11th Home Guard Battalion/Gränsjägar Battalion
- Norrbottensgruppen (NBG)
  - 12th Home Guard Battalion/Norrbotten Battalion
- Västerbottensgruppen (VBG)
  - 13th Home Guard Battalion/Västerbotten Battalion
- Fältjägargruppen (FJG)
  - 14th Home Guard Battalion/Fältjägar Battalion
- Västernorrlandsgruppen (VNG)
  - 15th Home Guard Battalion/Ångermanland Battalion
  - 16th Home Guard Battalion/Medelpad Battalion

== Heraldry and traditions ==
=== Coat of arms ===
The coat of arms of the Northern Military Region was previously used by the Northern Military District (Milo N) from 1994 to 2000 and the Northern Military District (MD N) from 2000 to 2005. Blazon: "Azure, the provincial badge of Västerbotten, a reindeer courant, armed gules, followed by a mullet, both argent. The shield surmounted an erect sword or."

== Commanding officers ==
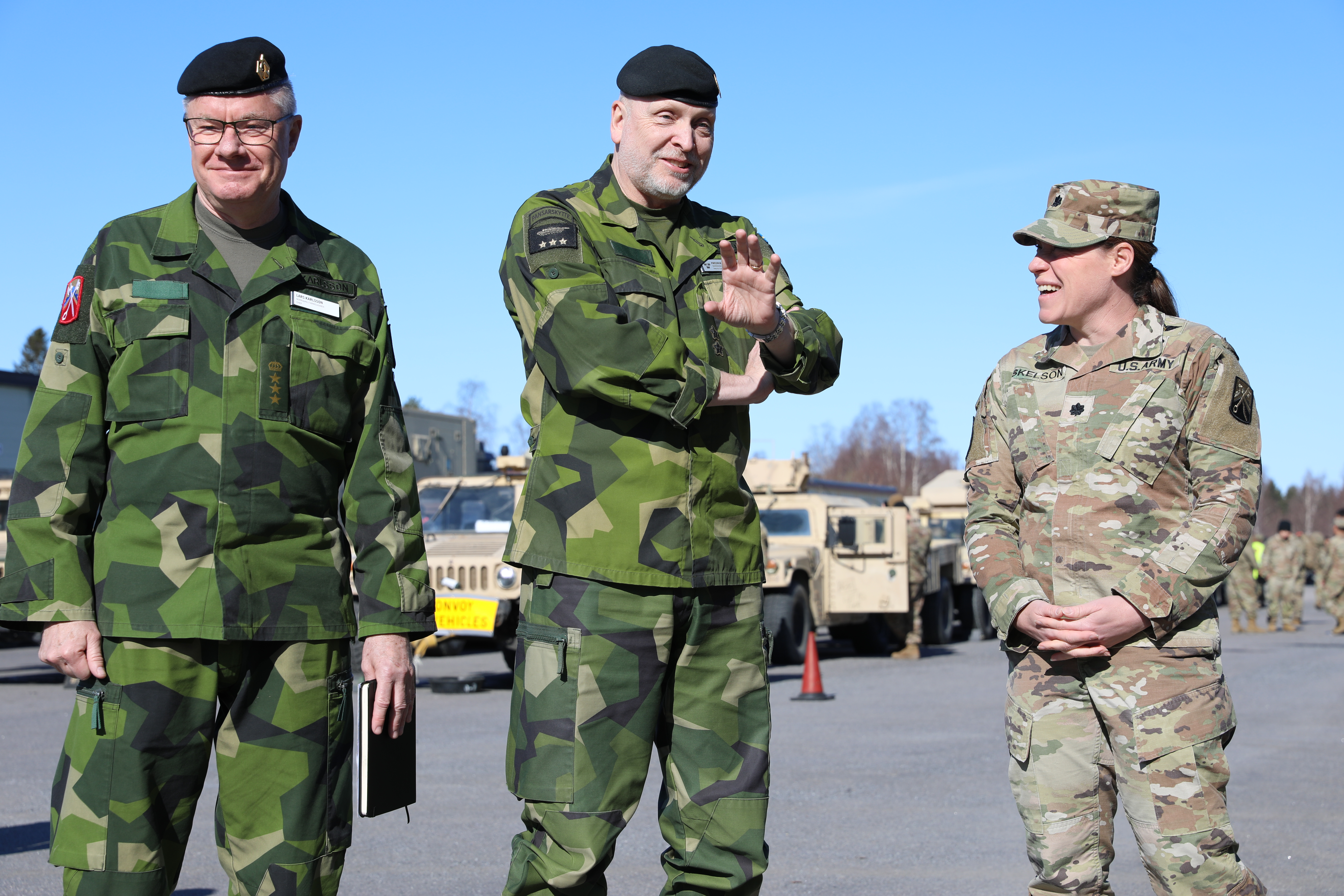
Colonel Lars Karlsson (left) as commander of the Northern Military Region, together with Major General Fredrik Ståhlberg.

From 2013 to 2017, the military region commander was also commander of the Norrbotten Regiment. From 2018 to 2020, military region commander was subordinate to the Chief of Joint Operations in territorial activities as well as in operations. Furthermore, the military region commander has territorial responsibility over his own military region and leads territorial activities as well as regional intelligence and security services. From 1 January 2020, all military region commanders are subordinate to the Chief of Home Guard.

- 2013–2014: Colonel Olof Granander
- 2014–2017: Colonel Mikael Frisell (Note: Frisell took over as commander on 10 December 2014, with an appointment no later than 30 September 2018.)
- 2018–2018: Colonel Ulf Siverstedt (Note: Siverstedt took over as commander on 1 January 2018, with an appointment no later than 30 September 2018.)
- 2018–2021: Colonel Ulf Siverstedt (Note: Siverstedt left I 19 and took over as commander of MR N with a new appointment on 1 October 2018, until no later than 31 March 2021.)
- 2021–2025: Colonel Lars Karlsson (Note: Lars Karlsson took over as commander on 29 March 2021 with an appointment no later than 31 January 2025.)
- 2025–20xx: Colonel Magnus Ståhl (Note: Magnus Ståhln took over as commander on 1 February 2025 with an appointment no later than 31 March 2029.)

== Names, designations and locations ==
Name	Translation	From		To
Militärregion Nord	Military Region North	2013-01-01	–	2018-12-31
Norra militärregionen	Northern Military Region	2019-01-01	–	
Designation		From		To
MR N		2013-01-01	–	
Location		From		To
Boden Garrison		2013-01-01	–	

== See also ==
- Northern Military District (Milo N)
- Northern Military District (MD N)
