= Northern Military District =

Northern Military District may refer to:

- 1st Brigade (New Zealand), formerly part of the Northern Military District
- Northern Military District (Milo N), a Swedish military district from 1993 to 2000
- Northern Military District (MD N), a Swedish military district from 2000 to 2005
- Northern Military District (Russia), until January 2021 known as the Northern Fleet Joint Strategic Command
- Northern Military District (Soviet Union)
- Northern Theatre Command (India), Indian Armed Forces
