= Lapland Ranger Group =

- Lapplandsjägargruppen
- Active: 2000–present
- Country: Sweden
- Branch: (Sweden) Home Guard
- Part of: Northern Military Region
- Headquarters: Kiruna
- Mottos: In omnia paratus ("Ready for everything")
- Beret colour: Khaki
- March: "Friska tag"

Commanders
- Commander: LtCol Jonas Brobakken

The Lapland Ranger Group (Note: Swedish: Lapplandsjägargruppen) (LJG) is a training group of the Swedish Home Guard based in Norrbotten County. It has been active since 2000. It is headquartered in Kiruna.

== History ==
In preparation for the Defence Act of 2000, the government proposed in its bill to the Riksdag that the tactical level should be reduced by disbanding the distribution and defence area staffs, as well as the naval commands and air commands. This was to create an army tactical, naval tactical and air tactical command, respectively, which would be co-located with the operational command. The proposal meant that all defence area staffs would be disbanded.

As part of the Defence Act of 2000, the defence and military areas were abolished on 30 June 2000 and, from 1 July 2000, military districts were organised in their place. This meant that, among other things, the Norrbotten Defence Area (Fo 63) was abolished. The new military districts corresponded geographically to the old military areas. The major difference was that the military districts were the lowest level where the commander was territorially responsible. Within the military districts, military district groups were organised, usually one for each county. In Norrbotten County, three military district groups were organised on 1 July 2000, the Norrbotten Border Ranger Group, the Norrbotten Group and the Lapland Ranger Group, which were subordinate to the Northern Military District (MD N).

=== Organisation ===
The Lapland Ranger Group is responsible for the training of two Home Guard Battalions.

- Lapland Ranger Group
  - 10th Home Guard Battalion
    - 10th Staff and Headquarters Platoon
    - 101st Rapid Response Company
    - 102nd Rapid Response Company
    - 103rd Rapid Response Company
    - 104th Flight Group
    - 105th Supply Group
  - 11th Home Guard Battalion
    - 11th Staff and Headquarters Platoon
    - 111th Rapid Response Company
    - 112th Rapid Response Company
    - 113th Rapid Response Company
    - 114th Rapid Response Company
    - 115th Naval Transport Company
    - 116th Flight Group
    - 117th Supply Group

== Traditions ==
The unit's heritage derives from the Lapland Ranger Regiment, including the group march "Friska tag" by Hjalmar Modéer, officially adopted on 27 November 2002.

Soldiers of the unit wear khaki berets, in common with the wider Home Guard, with the exception of those serving in the Swedish Armed Forces Music Corps, who wear red berets.

== Sources ==
- Riksdag (25 November 1999). "Det nya försvaret (Proposition 1999/2000:30)". riksdagen.se. Riksdag.
- Sandberg, Bo (2007). Försvarets marscher och signaler förr och nu. Gävle: The Swedish Military Music Society. ISBN 978-91-631-8699-8.
- Försvarsmakten (2015). "Uniformsbestämmelser 2015" (PDF). Reglemente (in Swedish). Stockholm: Swedish Armed Forces.
- Johansson, Thommy (13 October 2021). "Nu rycker värnpliktiga in i Kiruna igen – utbildas till skyttesoldater". Sveriges Television (in Swedish).
- Lindkvist, Elin (25 October 2024). ""Operation Mälardalen" har stärkt Lapplandsjägarna i Kiruna". Sveriges Television (in Swedish).
- Försvarsmakten (4 March 2026). "Lapplandsjägargruppen". forsvarsmakten.se (in Swedish).
