= Home Guard Medal of Merit =

Home Guard Medal of Merit may refer to:

- Norwegian Home Guard Medal of Merit, a medal of Norway
- Swedish Home Guard Medal of Merit, a medal of Sweden
