= Swedish Volunteer Air Corps =

Voluntary aviation auxiliary of the Swedish Home Guard

Swedish Voluntary Flying Corps
- Frivilliga Flygkåren
- Coat of arms of the Voluntary Flying Corps.
- Founded: 1961; 65 years ago
- Country: Sweden
- Allegiance: Swedish Armed Forces
- Role: Total defence
- Size: 2,400

Commanders
- Current commander: Hans Spets

The Swedish Volunteer Air Corps (Swedish: Frivilliga Flygkåren, FFK) is a voluntary defence organization of some 2,400 members (2013) distributed throughout Sweden. The pilots receive their initial training either through privately funded pilot licenses, through the Armed Forces or with bigger schools. Pilots in the FFK perform on a voluntary basis, assignment for Swedish authorities and the Armed Forces. FFK's headquarters are located at Stockholm Västerås Airport.

The FKK is part of Sweden's Total Defence policy, and as such operate in both civilian and military capacities. The aircraft used are largely externally privately owned or joint venture in the Swedish aviation clubs and consist mainly of general utility aircraft, such as the Cessna 172 and Piper PA-28.

== Flight Missions ==
In 2013 the FFK carried out air missions at regional and national level. FFK's civil air groups conducted missions including power line control after storm damage and searching for missing persons with the police.

== Young Pilots ==
The FFK conducts youth activities focusing on flying experiences for young people within the organization 'Young Pilots'. Business and recruitment is carried out mainly through the summer in different places across Sweden. Organizational activities during the remainder of the year are held in the regional and youth-led associations.

== See also ==
- Home Guard
- Swedish Auxiliary Naval Corps
- Swedish Voluntary Radio Organization
