= Swedish Auxiliary Naval Corps =

Voluntary naval auxiliary of the Swedish Navy

- Sjövärnskåren
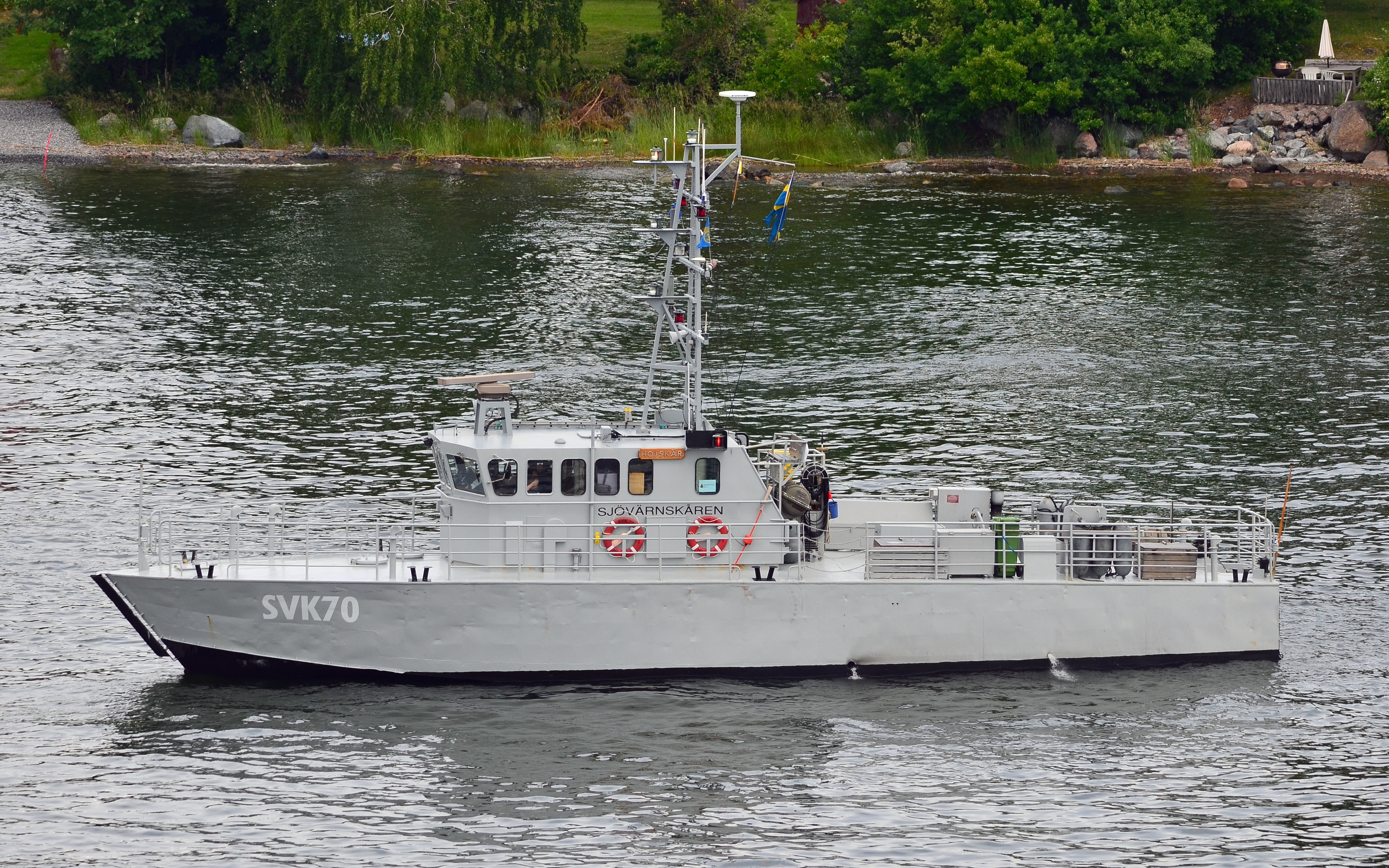
- HSwMS Hojskär (SVK70) in 2013, used by the Swedish Auxiliary Naval Corps
- Founded: 1915
- Country: Sweden
- Allegiance: Swedish Armed Forces
- Type: Coastal and Inland Waterway defence
- Role: Seamanship Training; Officer Training; Conscript Training
- Size: 4,000

Commanders
- Current commander: Anders Johansson (Chairman)

The National Association of Naval Volunteer Corps (Swedish: Sjövärnskårernas Riksförbund, SVK RF), commonly known as the Swedish Auxiliary Naval Corps (Note: Translated as the Swedish Auxiliary Naval Corps or the Swedish Naval Volunteer Reserve.) (Swedish: Sjövärnskåren, SVK) is a Swedish auxiliary defence organization that cooperate with the Swedish Armed Forces.

== Task ==
The task of SNV is to give further education to seamen and officers of the Swedish Navy, to provide personnel to the marine parts of the Swedish Home Guard and to introduce young people to the work in the Navy and other maritime professions through their youth organization known as the Swedish Sea Cadet Corps (SSCC). SNV is also a part of the International Sea Cadet Association through the SSCC.

== Swedish Sea Cadet Corps ==
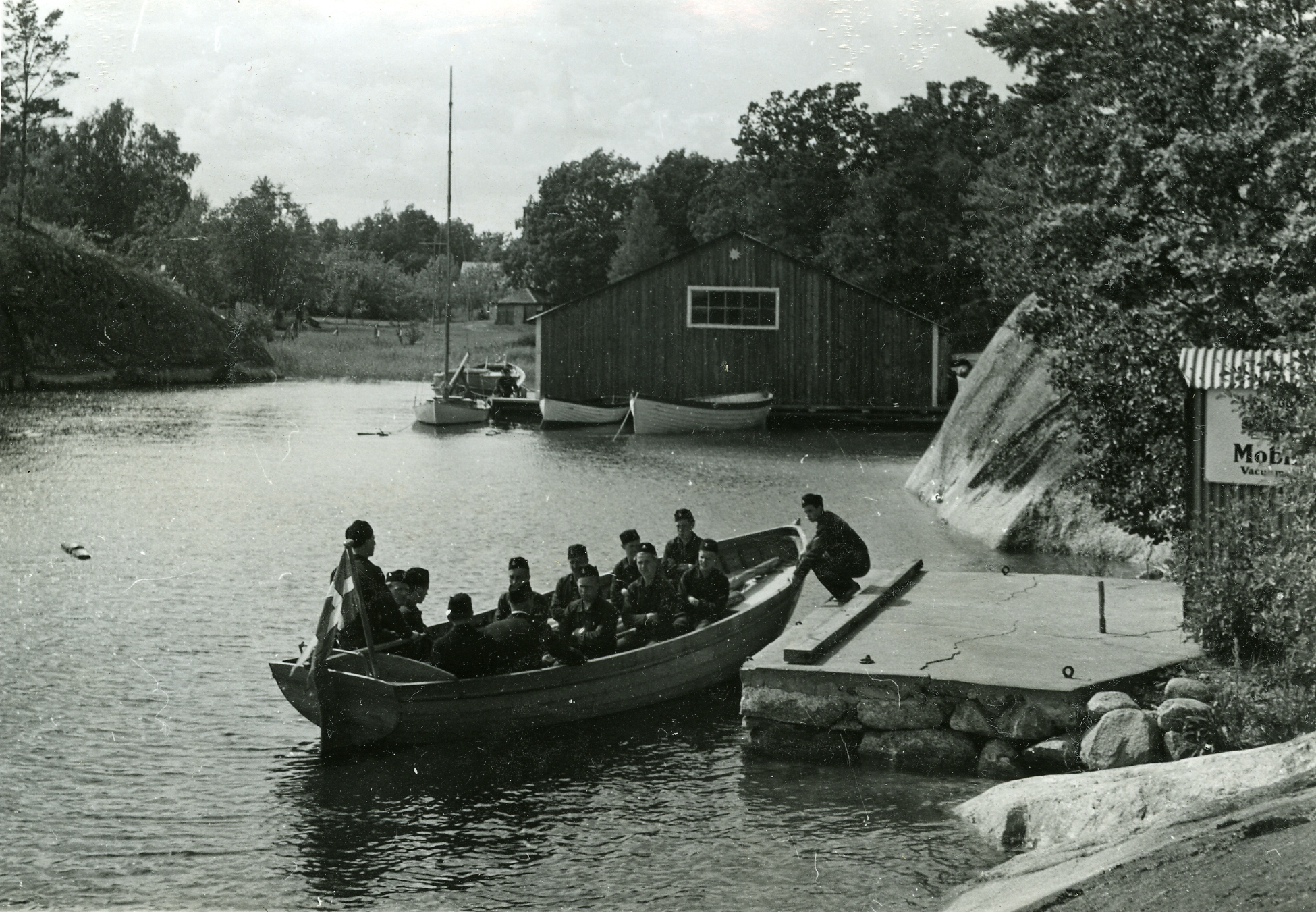
Rowing Exercise of the Aspirant School Finnhamn in 1942.

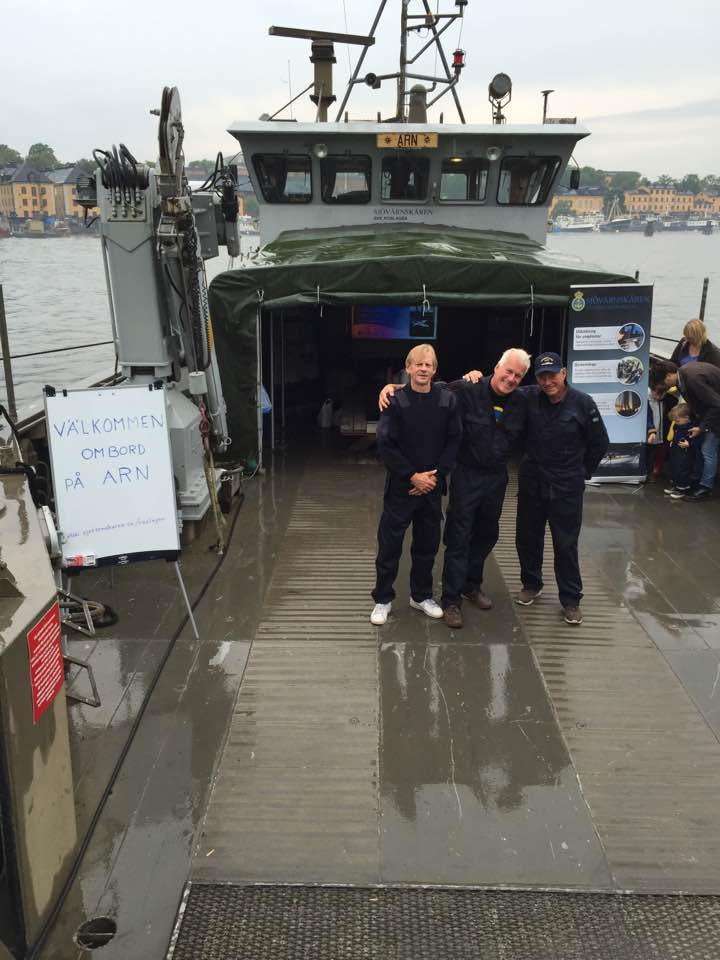
Members of Roslagens Sjövärnskår, Dan Koehl, Thomas Olheden and Roland Forsberg, onboard Trossbåt typ 600, SVK 655 Arn at Galärvarvet in 2016.

The Swedish Auxiliary Naval Corps run summer schools for young people aged 15–19 years. On the three-week-long summer schools, cadets are taught about seamanship, navigation, first aid, sailing, military demeanour, military history, defence knowledge, friendship, and everything else a navy man or woman is expected to be.

In their first summer cadets go on the Basic Course (Grundkurs), in their second summer cadets go on the Advanced Course (Fortsättningskurs) that provides advanced sailing skills, and in their third summer cadets go on the Internship Course (Praktikkurs), which provides practical knowledge in operating and working on larger vessels. There is also the possibility in their fourth summer for cadets to attend the Leadership Course (Ledarkurs) which trains Cadets to act as assistant instructors, who can then teach younger students.

During the winter cadets have the chance to improve their knowledge of what they have learned during the summer courses. Emphasis is placed on navigation, and cadets are expected to have passed the Inshore Yachtmaster Diploma and Coastal Yachtmaster Diploma before they have completed their three years. In the summer months as well as attending the summer schools Cadets have the opportunity to sail with the SNV fleet schooners HSwMS Gladan or HSwMS Falken and participate in exchanges under the International Sea Cadet Association (ISCA).

== Local units ==
- Blekinge Sjövärnskår
- Sjövärnskåren Stockholm
- Sjövärnskårsdivision Syd
- Gotlands Sjövärnskår
- Gävleborgs Sjövärnskår
- Göteborgs Sjövärnskår
- Kalmarsunds Sjövärnskår
- Nordvästra Skånes Sjövärnskår
- Norra Smålands Sjövärnskår
- Norrbottens Sjövärnskår
- Roslagens Sjövärnskår
- Sydöstra Skånes Sjövärnskår
- Södermanlands Sjövärnskår
- Södertörns Sjövärnskår
- Västernorrlands Sjövärnskår
- Öresunds Sjövärnskår
- Östergötlands Sjövärnskår

== See also ==
- Home Guard
- Swedish Voluntary Flying Corps
- Swedish Voluntary Radio Organization
