= Association of Home Guard Officers Merit Badge =

Swedish medal

- Type: Category L medal (Note: Category L includes merit badges or remembrance instituted by the Swedish Armed Forces' organizational units (units, centers and schools), the Home Guard and voluntary defense organizations. The category also includes previously granted carrying permits for e.g. officers 'unions (equivalent) and military associations (kamratföreningar) as well as other badges that have been approved by Swedish Armed Forces Headquarters.)
- Awarded for: Meritorious members of the Association of Home Guard Officers
- Country: Sweden
- Presented by: Association of Home Guard Officers
- Eligibility: Swedish personnel
- Status: Currently awarded
- Established: 1991
- Ribbon bar

Precedence
- Next (higher): Association of Home Guard Officers Royal Medal

The Association of Home Guard Officers Merit Badge (Swedish: Hemvärnsbefälets Riksförbunds förtjänsttecken, HBRGFt) is a Swedish merit badge established in 1991 by the Association of Home Guard Officers (Hemvärnsbefälets Riksförbund, HBR). It is awarded to members for meritorious active contributions within HBR's area of activity.

== History ==
Ahead of the Association of Home Guard Officers (Hemvärnsbefälets Riksförbund, HBR) 50th anniversary in 1991, the board decided to establish a merit badge. Permission was obtained from the Swedish Armed Forces to wear it on a uniform. Such consent was obtained in 1991. Statutes were adopted by the board on 24 August 1991.

== Appearance ==
=== Medal ===
The merit badge, which is of the 8th size, is of elliptical shape and occupies on the side a shield with Three Crowns and the letter H (for Home Guard below and HBR above. Everything is wrapped around a wreath. The reverse is smooth. The merit badge is embossed in gilded oxidized bronze. The merit badge is also available as a miniature medal.

=== Ribbon ===
The ribbon is of green moiré pattern with five evenly divided yellow stripes.

== Criteria ==
The merit badge is awarded to members for meritorious active contributions within HBR's area of activity. The merit badge can also be awarded to personnel within the Swedish Armed Forces and voluntary organizations, as well as others who have made a meritorious contribution to the association 's development. The number of merit badges awarded each year is determined by HBR's national board. The merit badge is accompanied by a printed diploma. The right to make proposals belongs to the national board and the associations' boards. The application on the approved form is submitted to the national board and submitted to the association's medal administrator. If several people from the same association are proposed at the same time, priority must be stated. The application must be accompanied by a copy of the association board's minutes or a certified transcript of the decision. An application rejected by the association board can be appealed to the association. To assist in the valuation of the applicants, the national board has applied an established valuation scale. According to this, the proposed candidate must achieve at least 20 points. Decisions on allocation are made by HBR's national board or its working committee. The decision cannot be appealed.

== Presenting ==
The merit badge with a diploma should be awarded during a ceremony, such as the annual meeting of the association, etc. The national board registers the merit badges awarded. They are numbered in consecutive number order. The numbering is entered on the diploma with award year/serial no. Through the proposer's care, number, name and award year are engraved on the reverse of the merit badge. The costs for the merit badge are disputed by the proposer (the board of the association). The national board provides merit badges in cases, medal ribbons, miniatures and printed diplomas.

== Wearing ==
The merit badge may be worn on Swedish uniform in accordance with the Supreme Commander's regulations FFS 1996:14 and UniR A.

== See also ==
- Association of Home Guard Officers Royal Medal
