= Central Military Region (Sweden) =

- Mellersta militärregionen
- Active: 2013–present
- Country: Sweden
- Allegiance: Swedish Armed Forces
- Branch: Joint
- Type: Military region
- Role: Operational, territorial and tactical activities
- Part of: Swedish Armed Forces Headquarters (Note: In the years 2013–2019, the military region staff was subordinate to the commander of the Life Guards, and since 2020 its directly subordinate to the Chief of Home Guard.)
- Garrison/HQ: Kungsängen

Commanders
- Current commander: COL Gustaf Dufberg

The Central Military Region (Swedish: Mellersta militärregionen, MR M) is a Swedish military region within the Swedish Armed Forces. Established in 2013, the military region staff in based in Kungsängen. The military region includes Dalarna County, Gotland County, Gävleborg County, Stockholm County, Södermanland County, Uppsala County and Västmanland County.

== History ==
The Central Military Region was formed on 1 January 2013 as Military Region Central, as one of four military regions in Sweden. The military region includes Dalarna County, Gotland County, Gävleborg County, Stockholm County, Södermanland County, Uppsala County and Västmanland County. The region's staff is co-located with the Life Guards in Kungsängen with the task of leading surveillance and protection tasks, implementing civil-military cooperation and support to society. The military region was also responsible for leading the production of the training groups and the Home Guard units in East Middle Sweden. The responsibility involves both training personnel for the Home Guard units and leading them in operations. The Central Military Region's Home Guard battalions are eleven in number. On 1 October 2018, a separate command position was appointed for Military Region Central. From 2019, the name Central Military Region was adopted. From 1 January 2020, all military regions are independent units subordinate to the Chief of Home Guard. In doing so, the regions also take over the command in peacetime from the training groups with their Home Guard battalions. Each military region has production management responsibility. This meant that five training groups were transferred to the Central Military Region. In a government's bill, however, the Swedish government emphasized that the military regional division could be adjusted, depending on the outcome of the investigation Ansvar, ledning och samordning inom civilt försvar ("Responsibility, leadership and coordination in civil defense").

== Units ==
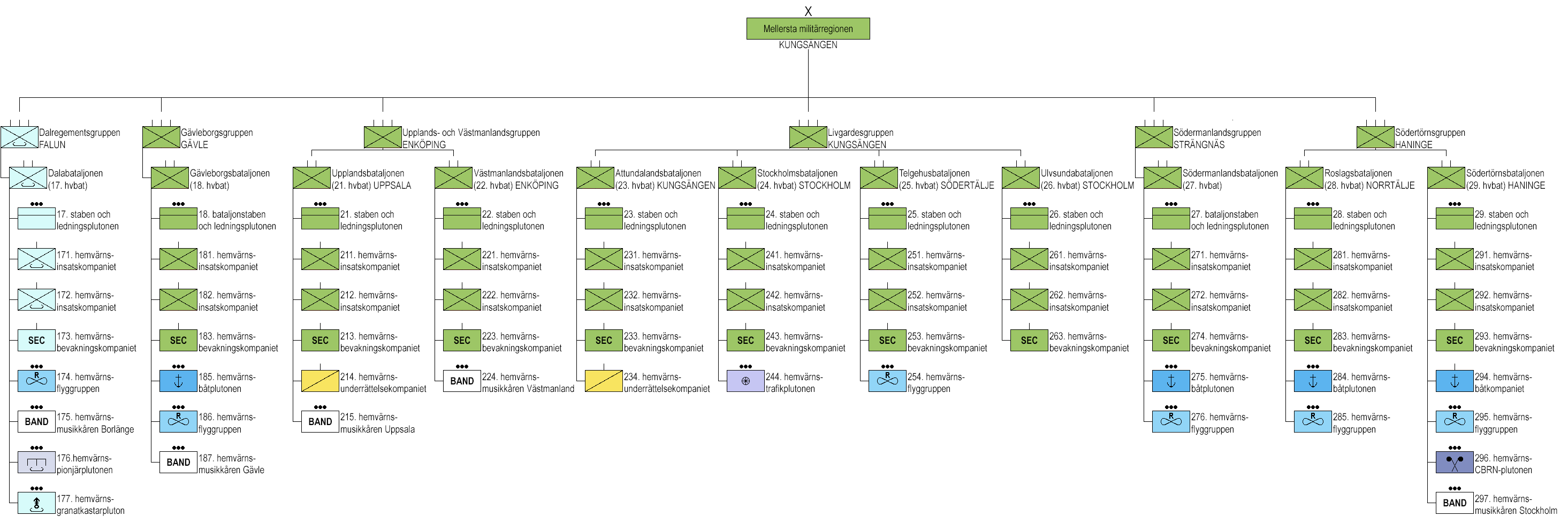
Central Military Region organization as of April 2026 (click to enlarge)

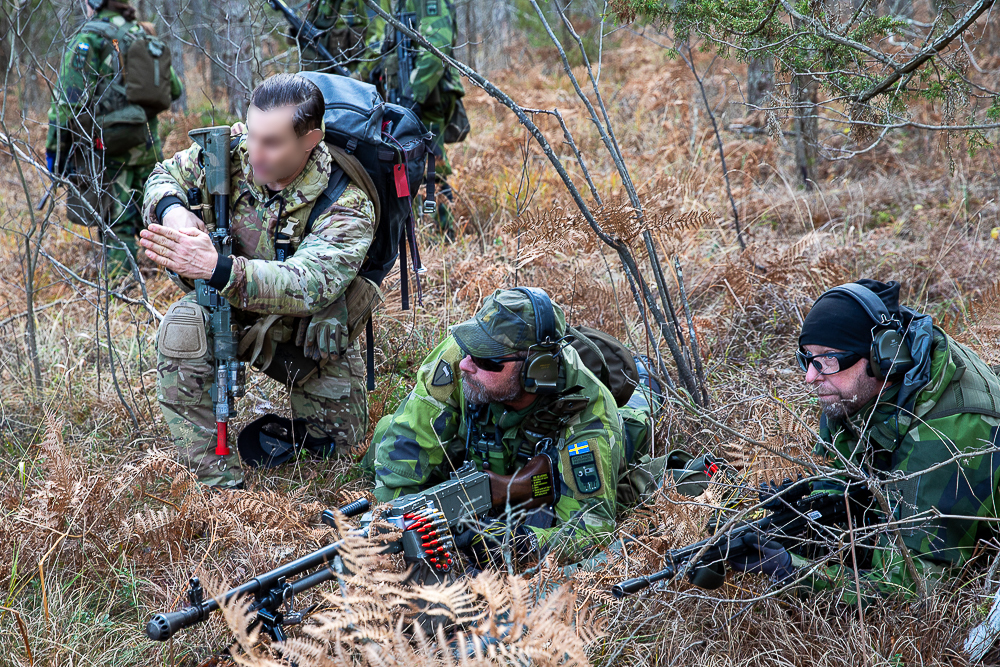
Gotland home guard

- Dalregementsgruppen (DRG)
  - 17th Home Guard Battalion/Dalarna Battalion
- Gävleborgsgruppen (GBG)
  - 18th Home Guard Battalion/Gävleborg Battalion
- Upplands- och Västmanlandsgruppen (UVG)
  - 21st Home Guard Battalion/Uppland Battalion
  - 22nd Home Guard Battalion/Västmanland Battalion
- Livgardesgruppen (LGG)
  - 23rd Home Guard Battalion/Attundaland Battalion
  - 24th Home Guard Battalion/Stockholm Battalion
  - 25th Home Guard Battalion/Telgehus Battalion
  - 26th Home Guard Battalion/Ulvsunda Battalion
- Södertörnsgruppen (STG)
  - 28th Home Guard Battalion/Roslagen Battalion
  - 29th Home Guard Battalion/Södertörn Battalion
- Gotlandsgruppen (UGG) (Note: Partly subordinate to the commander of the Gotland Regiment (P 18).)
  - 32nd Home Guard Battalion/Gotland Battalion
- Södermanlandsgruppen (SMG)
  - 45th Home Guard Battalion

=== Former units ===
- Forward Command Gotland (Framskjuten ledning Gotland, FLG) was formed on 1 October 2016. It was part of the regional staff in the Central Military Region.

== Heraldry and traditions ==
=== Coat of arms ===
Blazon of the coat of arms of the Central Military Region: "Or, the provincial badge of Uppland, an orb azure, banded and ensigned with a cross crosslet, on a chief azur three open crowns fesswise or. The shield surmounting an erect sword or."

== Commanding officers ==
From 2013 to 2017, the military region commander was also commander of the Life Guards. From 2018 to 2020, military region commander was subordinate to the Chief of Joint Operations in territorial activities as well as in operations. Furthermore, the military region commander has territorial responsibility over his own military region and leads territorial activities as well as regional intelligence and security services. From 1 January 2020, all military region commanders are subordinate to the Chief of Home Guard.

- 2013–2014: Colonel Håkan Hedlund
- 2014–2017: Colonel Christer Tistam
- 2017-11-08 – 2022-03-31: Colonel Thomas Karlsson (Note: Thomas Karlsson took office on 8 November 2017. In 2020, he received an extended appointment until 31 March 2022.)
- 2022-04-01 – 2023: Colonel Mattias Ardin
- 2023-06-19 – 2026: Captain (N) Magnus Lüning
- 2026-09-01 – present: Colonel Gustaf Dufberg

== Names, designations and locations ==
Name	Translation	From		To
Militärregion Mitt	Military Region Central	2013-01-01	–	2018-12-31
Mellersta militärregionen	Central Military Region	2019-01-01	–	
Designation		From		To
MR M		2013-01-01	–	
Location		From		To
Kungsängen		2013-01-01	–	

== See also ==
- Middle Military District (Milo M)
