= Home Guard Service Medal =

- Type: Category I medal (Note: Category I includes other official medals that are instituted or approved by the King in Council, from 1975 by the Swedish government, and/or are awarded by government agencies and royal academies.)
- Awarded for: Home Guard service
- Country: Sweden
- Presented by: Home Guard
- Eligibility: Home Guard personnel
- Status: Currently awarded
- Established: 1 January 2019
- Ribbon bar

The Home Guard Service Medal (Swedish: Hemvärnets tjänstgöringsmedalj, HVtjgSM/GM/GMmemalj) is a service medal awarded by the Swedish Home Guard. The award is given to Home Guard soldiers, Home Guard musicians and volunteer staff with a valid Home Guard contract and to those who remain in the Home Guard as a Home Guard veteran. The medal is made of three denominations: silver (silver-plated bronze alloy), gold (gilded bronze alloy) and gold with enamel (gilded bronze alloy with the shield enamelled in blue and with red in the royal crown).

== History ==
The National Home Guard Council (Rikshemvärnsrådet) noted that the Swedish Armed Forces had introduced a service medal for GSS (Note: GSS stands for gruppbefäl ("squad leader"), soldiers and seaman, who are military personnel who do not have officer training.) and the award committee investigated whether the Home Guard's service badge should be discontinued in favor of a system with service medals. The Home Guard Department (Rikshemvärnsavdelningen, PROD RIKSHV) in the Swedish Armed Forces Headquarters submitted the award committee's proposal to the Training Department (Produktionsledningens utbildningsavdelning, PROD UTB) for preparation, after which the matter was returned to PROD RIKSHV. The award committee's proposal was that the service badge (Tjänsteårstecken m/43) in bronze and silver was proposed to be retained for youth activities (3 and 5 years, respectively, the 5 year badge is also used for adults). Other service badges would be discontinued. The Home Guard Service Medal was introduced with the service badge as a model for the medal. The medal was considered to appear in three different denominations and years of service are marked in accordance with previous service badges.

The National Home Guard Council's proposal was judged to be mainly in line with the development of merit badges that were in place at the time. The Chief of Home Guard affirmed that years of Tjänsteårstecken m/43 in bronze and silver (3 and 5 years for youth activities, etc.) were retained and that other service badges were to be phased out. The medal was designed with previous service badges in gold as a model. Custom is that the denominations bronze (exceptional cases), silver and gold are used. The award committee's proposal to use enamelled design in the two higher awards was met in this case with a division into: silver, gold and gold with enamel. The medal clasps are used on the Swedish Armed Forces International Service Medal and may also be used on awards for other missions. The Home Guard Service Medal should therefore instead be provided with additional signs in the form of digits in the middle of the medal ribbon and the ribbon bar, respectively.

From 1 January 2019, the Swedish Armed Forces decided to introduce the Home Guard Service Medal in silver, gold and gold with enamel with numerical additions 15, 25, 40, 50, 60, 70 and 75. The award is a state official award in category I (other state awards). The medal is allowed to be carried on the Swedish Armed Forces' uniforms in accordance with the uniform regulations in force at any given time. In connection with the medal's establishment, the Home Guard's service badges were discontinued, except for 3 and 5 years, respectively. The decision in this case was made by General Micael Bydén. The Secretary of the National Guard Council, Major Mats Jonsson, and the Chief of Home Guard, Major General Stefan Sandborg, participated in the final handling of the case.

== Appearance ==
=== Medal ===
The medal have three denominations: silver (silver-plated bronze alloy), gold (gilded bronze alloy) and gold with enamel (gilded bronze alloy with the shield enamelled in blue and with red in the royal crown). The award is made in the 8th size (33 mm high). The obverse shows an open laurel wreath around the Home Guard's heraldic arms. The reverse is smooth (engraved). The organizational unit that awards the medal has the reverse engraved with the Home Guard battalion's name in short form and the year in which the award was awarded.

Example of engraving: 13.hvbat ("13th Home Guard Battalion") 2018

Additional characters consist of silver-plated digits 1 and 5 and gilded numbers 0, 2, 3, 4, 5, 6 and 7, similar to the additional characters/digits that are already in use in the Swedish Armed Forces (on the Swedish Armed Forces International Service Medal). The medal includes a diploma in the form of the Home Guard's diploma with the Chief of Home Guard's signature in facsimile and a place for a countersignature by the assigned commander.

=== Ribbon ===
The medal ribbon is yellow with a blue stripe in each edge and in the middle (1/10/13/10/1). Additional digits are attached to the middle field.

== Criteria ==
The Home Guard Service Medal is an award given to a Home Guard soldier, Home Guard musician and volunteer staff with a valid Home Guard contract and to those who remain in the Home Guard as a Home Guard veteran. Each individual awarding must be decided in writing by the head of the organizational unit. Anyone who has previously received the Home Guard service badge shall be awarded the service medal with a numerical supplement corresponding to the year of service badge held. The award therefore applies retroactively.

== Acquisition ==
Medal and medal ribbon in case, diploma and additional marks (silver-plated / gilded digits) are procured by the respective organizational unit and ordered in accordance with the applicable agreement. The award is awarded by the head of the organizational unit and is awarded by the same, or appointed by the same, in solemn forms.

== Presenting ==
=== Silver medal (HVtjgSM) ===
Awarded after 10 contractual years of service. After 15 contractual years of service, silver digits are awarded as additional marks "15" for mounting on medal ribbon and medal bar on existing medals. A new diploma is issued and awarded together with the digits.

=== Gold medal (HVtjgGM) ===
Awarded after 20 contractual years of service. After 25 years of service in accordance with the agreement, gilded digits are awarded as an additional mark "25" for mounting on a medal ribbon and ribbon bar on an existing medal. A new diploma is issued and awarded together with the digits.

=== Gold medal with enamel (HVtjgGMmemalj) ===
Awarded after 30 contractual years of service. After 40, 50, 60, 70 and 75 years of contractual service (corresponding to the Home Guard veteran), gilded digits are awarded as additional marks for mounting on a medal ribbon and medal bar on an existing medal. A new diploma is issued and awarded together with the digits.

=== Retroactive awarding ===
In the case of a retroactive awarding, only the highest denomination that the recipient can receive is awarded.

=== Lost medal and acquisition at own expense ===
Lost medals are repurchased through the care of the individual at no additional cost to the Swedish Armed Forces. Individuals who meet the criteria for the award can obtain the medal at their own expense. Anyone who obtains a medal at their own expense does not receive a diploma.
