= Home Guard (Sweden) =

Reserve force of the Swedish Armed Forces

Home Guard – National Security Forces
- Hemvärnet – Nationella skyddsstyrkorna
- Coat of arms of the Home Guard – National Security Forces.
- Founded: May 29, 1940; 86 years ago
- Country: Sweden
- Branch: Swedish Armed Forces
- Type: Motorised light infantry
- Role: Support of Mobilisation; Rapid countermeasure Surveillance; Disaster relief Search and rescue
- Size: 21,200 (40 battalions)
- Garrison/HQ: Stockholm
- March: "Hemvärnets marsch" (Home Guard March) - Helge Damberg
- Anniversaries: May 29th

Commanders
- Chief of Home Guard: Major general Mattias Ardin
- Notable commanders: Major general Gustaf Petri

The Home Guard – National Security Forces (Swedish: Hemvärnet – Nationella skyddsstyrkorna) is a military reserve force of the Swedish Armed Forces. It was formally established on May 29, 1940, during World War II upon popular demand. While originally composed of former militia groups, today it comprises half of the Swedish Army, thus constituting the basis of the territorial defence of Sweden.

The Home Guard consists mainly of local rapid response units, numbering 17,000 of the 22,000 total Home Guard strength, organised in 40 battalions, with 23 associated auxiliary defence organisations. Most soldiers maintain a civilian job while serving the army part-time. Rapid response units were formed in the early 2000s in parallel to the Swedish government's abolishment of conscription to the Swedish Armed Forces; small-scale conscription has since been reintroduced.

The Chief of Home Guard is the commanding officer of the Home Guard, representing 40,000 present and veteran soldiers, reporting directly to the Chief of Defence.

== History ==
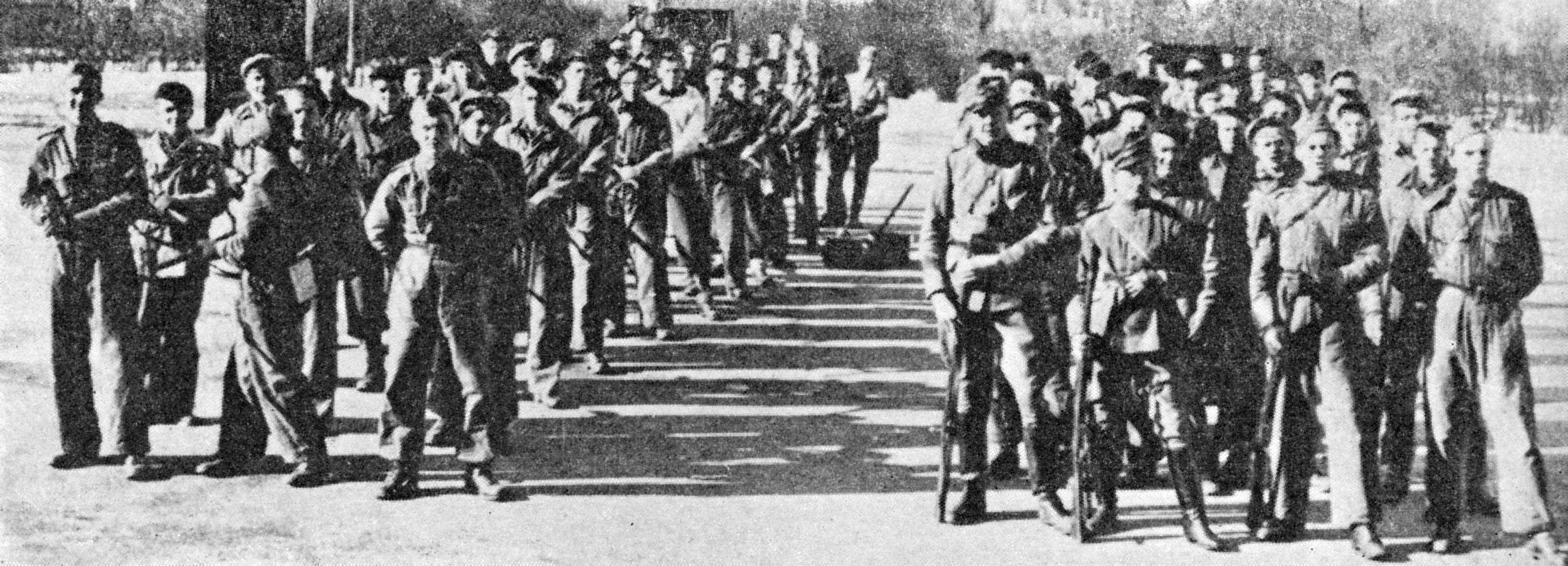
Home Guard soldiers in Lund, Scania, in 1940

The establishment of the Home Guard was passed into law by the Riksdag on May 29, 1940, after the beginning of World War II, however, units had already been formed by the military before this. Home Guard units were groups of usually eight to 15 men that were to serve as defence units in case of war, located in towns and in both private and state-owned factories, throughout all of Sweden. Members of these small units usually consisted of former professional military men who were equipped with rifles, machine guns, ammunition, medicine, uniforms, and had the option of buying additional materials such as skis, sweaters and marching boots. An additional group, called the Swedish Women's Voluntary Defence Organization, helped with additional tasks that the Home Unit was unable to perform themselves. The Swedish Women's Voluntary Defence Organization helped provide the home unit with additional items such as socks, scarves and gloves as well as performing all administrative work that the unit could not afford to do themselves. In case of war, and in case the Home Guard was unable to utilize local hospitals, the Swedish Red Cross was prepared to set up first aid stations for its use.

== Organisation ==
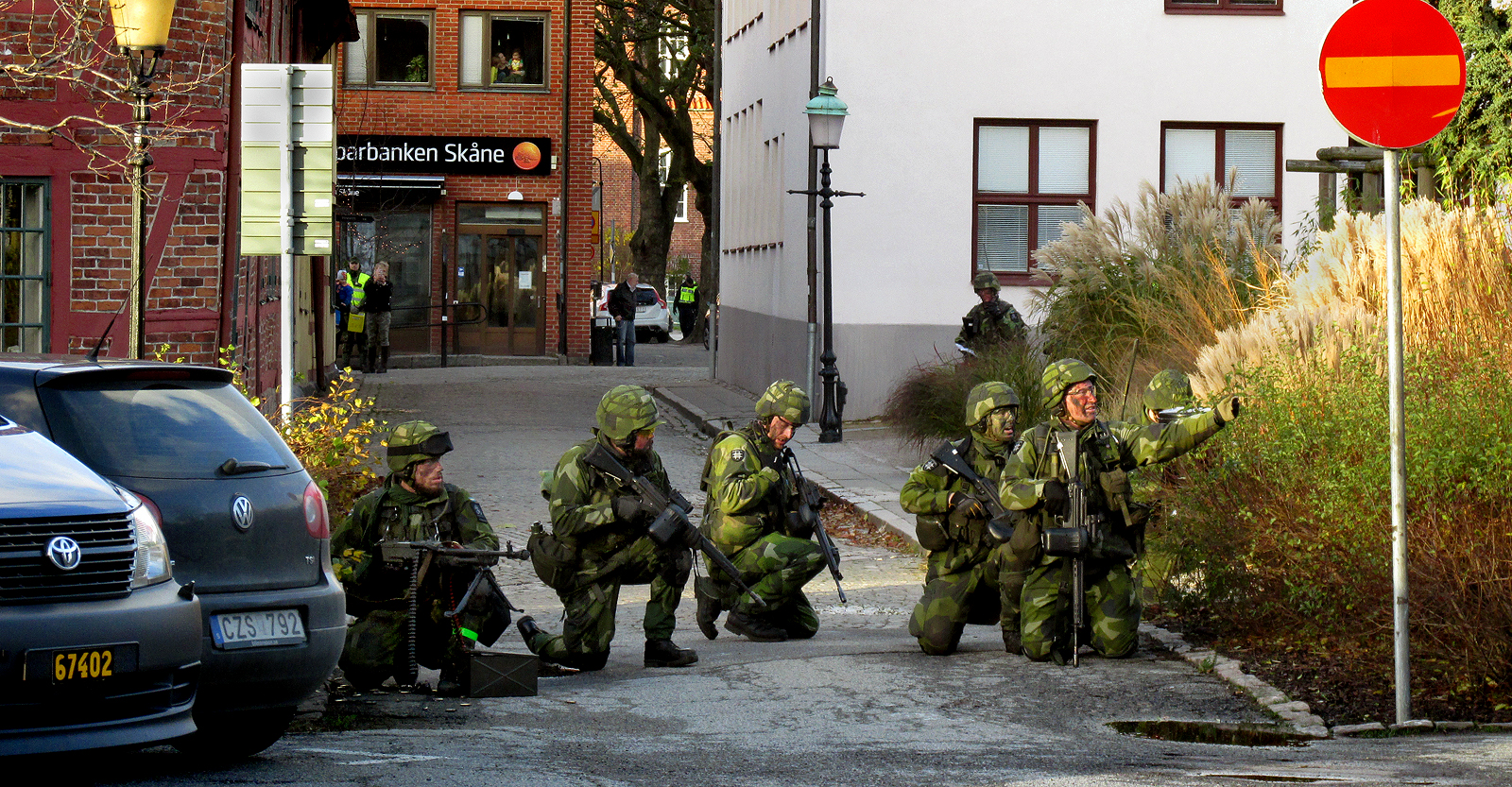
Home Guard soldiers in Ystad during an exercise

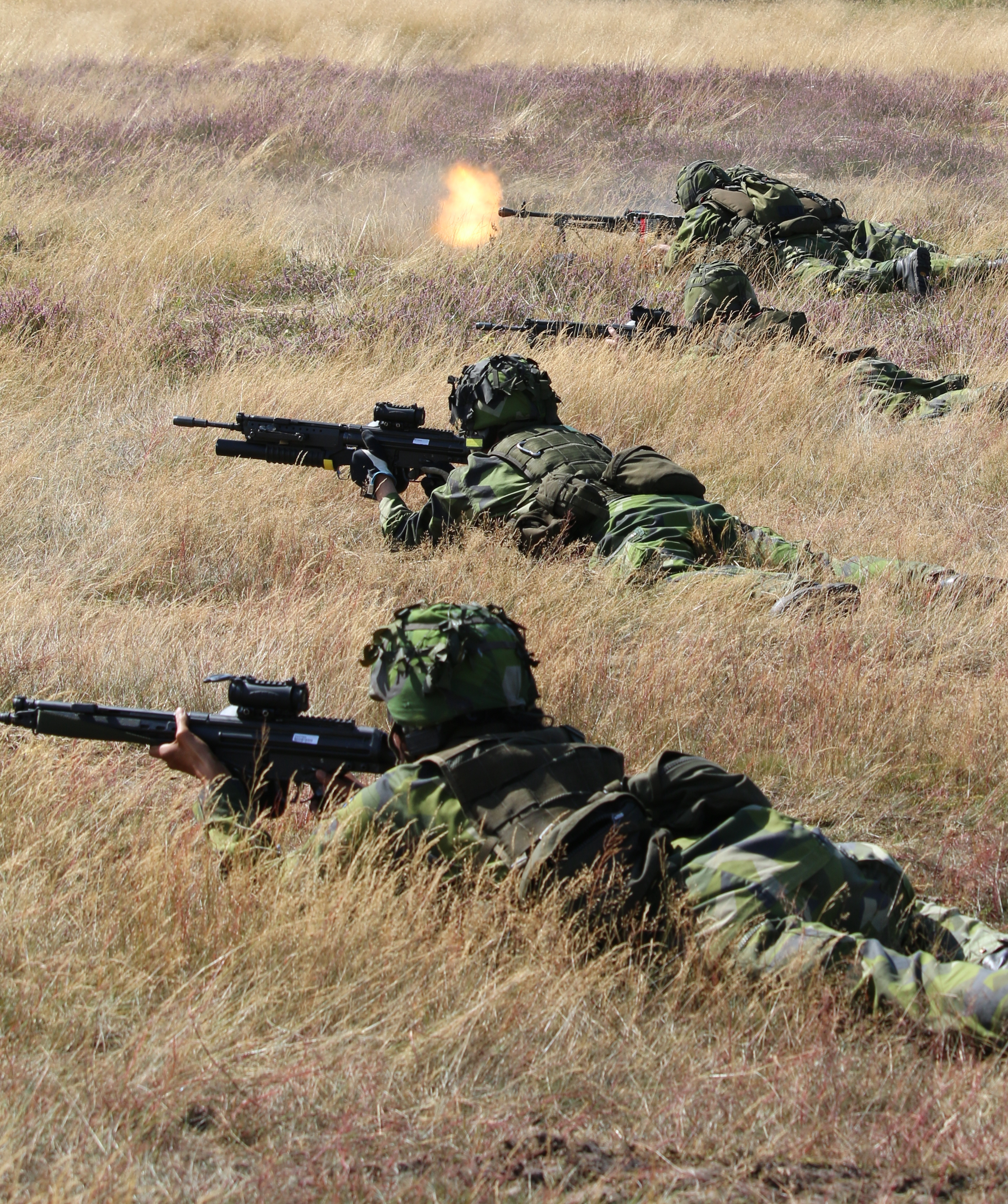
Swedish Home Guard soldiers

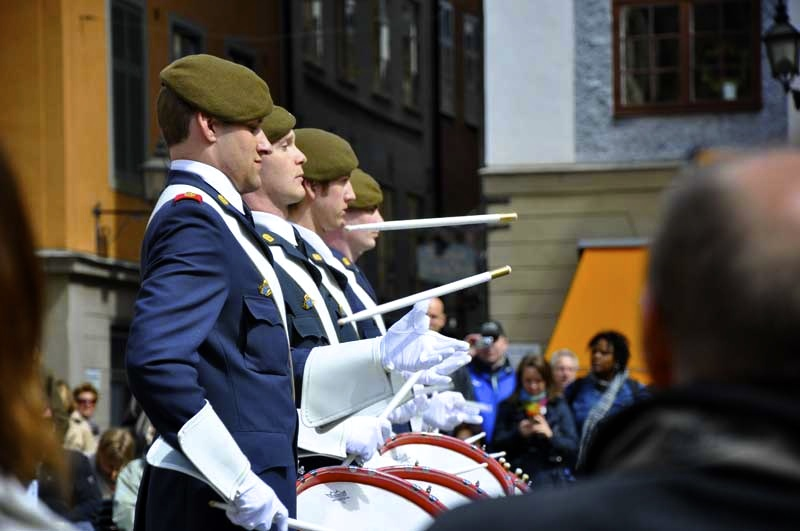
Drummers of the Home Guard Band of Eslöv at the Royal Palace in Stockholm

The Home Guard with the national security forces are part of the Swedish Armed Forces' mission-based organization. The Home Guard is a unit and constitutes the basis for the protection of Sweden. It has the task of operating over the entire conflict scale, from societal support during great strains in peacetime to armed combat in times of war.

The units of the Home Guard have a response capability that is measured in hours, as opposed to days or weeks. The personnel is made up of locally recruited volunteers and consists largely of experienced soldiers and officers with a background in mission-based units.

When the Armed Forces are called in to help with forest fires, flooding or missing person searches, it often falls to Home Guard units to support the police and Rescue Services. Territorial surveillance, base security, escort duties, transport protection, target identification and artillery spotting are other typical Home Guard duties.

In addition to personnel who have completed their national service or Basic Military Training, the Home Guard includes a large proportion of specialists, for example, paramedics, motorcycle orderlies and dog handlers, that are recruited and trained by voluntary defence organizations.

=== Territorial organisation ===
Sweden is divided into four military regions:

- Northern Military Region (MR N) comprises Norrbotten, Västerbotten, Jämtland and Västernorrland counties. The regional command is located at Norrbotten Regiment (I 19) headquarters in Boden.
- Central Military Region (MR M) comprises Stockholm and Gotland, Södermanland, Uppsala, Västmanland, Dalarna and Gävleborg counties. The regional command is located at the Life Guards (LG) headquarters in Stockholm.
- Western Military Region (MR V) comprises Västra Götaland, Halland, Örebro and Värmland counties. The regional command is located at Skaraborg Regiment (P 4) headquarters in Skövde.
- Southern Military Region (MR S) comprises Skåne, Blekinge, Kronoberg, Jönköping, Kalmar and Östergötland counties. The regional command is located at South Scanian Regiment (P 7) headquarters Revinge.

Home Guard battalions are supported for administration, training and logistics by 22 Training Groups (Swedish Utbildningsgrupp). The Training Groups are for the most parts the descendants of disbanded regiments and most Home Guard battalions carry the colours and traditions of its antecedent regiment, e.g. the 17. Dalabataljonen which carries the colours and traditions of the Dalarna Regiment (raised 1628 and disbanded in 2000). Usually, each Training Group supports 1-2 battalions but some have four battalions. The Training Groups in turn belong to a regular regiment. Uniform guidelines and materials for courses are determined centrally by the National Home Guard Combat School.

=== Units ===
As of 2012, the Home Guard consists of 22,000 soldiers (down from 42,000 in 2001) organized into 40 light infantry battalions (down from 69 in 2001) of 300-700 personnel.

In 2001, the Rapid Response units numbered around 5,000 soldiers of the total of 42,000. Rapid Response units have more combat tasks compared to the rest of the Home Guard, including escort duties. Some battalions located near the coast also have marine companies equipped with Combat Boat 90.

As of 2014, the majority of the force, 17,000 out of 22,000 soldiers will be in Rapid Response units. The decrease in number of troops comes with an equal increase in quality and modern equipment.

The designation "hvbat" is an abbreviation of "Hemvärnsbataljon", or "Home Guard Battalion".

Designation	Unit (Swedish)	Unit (English)	Training Group	Comments
10. hvbat	Lapplandsjägarbataljonen	Lapland Rifles Battalion	Lapplandsjägargruppen	Arctic, includes an aircraft troop
11. hvbat	Gränsjägarbataljonen	Border Rifles Battalion	Lapplandsjägargruppen	Arctic, includes an aircraft troop and a boat platoon
12. hvbat	Norrbottensbataljonen	North Bothnia Battalion	Norrbottensgruppen	Arctic, includes an aircraft troop, a pioneer platoon and a logistics (fuel and ammunition) platoon
13. hvbat	Västerbottensbataljonen	West Bothnia Battalion	Västerbottensgruppen	Arctic, includes an aircraft troop, a logistics (fuel and ammunition) platoon, a boat platoon and a CBRN platoon
14. hvbat	Fältjägarbataljonen	Light Infantry Battalion	Fältjägargruppen	Arctic, includes a logistics (fuel and ammunition) platoon and a reconnaissance company
15. hvbat	Ångermanlandsbataljonen	Ångermanland Battalion	Västernorrlandsgruppen	Arctic, includes a logistics (fuel and ammunition) platoon, a traffic platoon and a boat platoon
16. hvbat	Medelpadsbataljonen	Medelpad Home Guard Battalion	Västernorrlandsgruppen	Arctic, includes an air troop, a logistics (fuel and ammunition) platoon and a boat platoon
17. hvbat	Dalabataljonen	Dalarna Home Guard Battalion	Dalregementsgruppen	Arctic, includes an aircraft troop and a mortar platoon
18. hvbat	Gävleborgsbataljonen	Gävleborg Battalion	Gävleborgsgruppen	Includes an aircraft troop and a boat platoon
19. hvbat	Värmlandsbataljonen	Värmland Home Guard Battalion	Örebro och Värmlandsgruppen	Includes an aircraft troop
20. hvbat	Sannahedsbataljonen	Sannahed Home Guard Battalion	Örebro och Värmlandsgruppen	Includes an aircraft troop and a pioneer platoon
21. hvbat	Upplandsbataljonen	Uppland Home Guard Battalion	Uppland/Västmanlandsgruppen	Includes a reconnaissance company
22. hvbat	Västmanlandsbataljonen	Västmanland Home Guard Battalion	Uppland/Västmanlandsgruppen	
23. hvbat	Attundalandsbataljonen	Attundaland Home Guard Battalion	Livgardesgruppen	Includes a reconnaissance company
24. hvbat	Stockholmsbataljonen	Stockholm Home Guard Battalion	Livgardesgruppen	Includes a traffic platoon
25. hvbat	Telgehusbataljonen	Telgehus Home Guard Battalion	Livgardesgruppen	Includes an aircraft troop
26. hvbat	Ulvsundabataljonen	Ulvsunda Home Guard Battalion	Livgardesgruppen	
27. hvbat	Södermanlandsbataljonen	Södermanland Home Guard Battalion	Södermanlandsgruppen	Includes an aircraft troop and a boat platoon
28. hvbat	Roslagsbataljonen	Roslagen Home Guard Battalion	Södertörnsgruppen	Includes an aircraft troop and a boat platoon
29. hvbat	Södertörnsbataljonen	Södertörn Home Guard Battalion	Södertörnsgruppen	Includes an aircraft troop and a CBRN platoon and a boat company
30. hvbat	Första livgrenadjärbataljonen	1st Life Grenadier Battalion	Livgrenadjärgruppen	
31. hvbat	Andra livgrenadjärbataljonen	2nd Life Grenadier Battalion	Livgrenadjärgruppen	Includes 2 boat platoons
32. hvbat	Gotlandsbataljonen	Gotland Battalion	Gotlandsgruppen	Includes an aircraft troop and a boat platoon
33. hvbat	Norra Smålandsbataljonen	North Småland Battalion	Norra Smålandsgruppen	Includes an aircraft troop and a pioneer platoon
34. hvbat	Kalmarbataljonen	Kalmar Battalion	Kalmar och Kronobergsgruppen	
35. hvbat	Kronobergsbataljonen	Kronoberg Battalion	Kalmar och Kronobergsgruppen	Includes a reconnaissance company
36. hvbat	Blekinge västra bataljon	West Blekinge Battalion	Blekingegruppen	Includes an aircraft troop
37. hvbat	Blekinge östra bataljon	East Blekinge Battalion	Blekingegruppen	Includes a boat company
38. hvbat	Kinnebataljonen	Kinne Home Guard Battalion	Skaraborgsgruppen	Includes an aircraft troop and a traffic platoon
39. hvbat	Kåkindbataljonen	Kåkind Home Guard Battalion	Skaraborgsgruppen	Includes an aircraft troop
40. hvbat	Bohusbataljonen	Bohusläns Home Guard Battalion	Bohusdalgruppen	Includes an aircraft troop and a boat company
41. hvbat	Göteborgs södra bataljon	South Gothenburg Home Guard Battalion	Elfsborgsgruppen	Includes a reconnaissance company with an aircraft troop.
42. hvbat	Göteborgs norra bataljon	North Gothenburg Home Guard Battalion	Elfsborgsgruppen	Includes a CBRN platoon
43. hvbat	Göteborgs skärgårds bataljon	Gothenburg Archipelago Battalion	Elfsborgsgruppen	Includes a boat company
44. hvbat	Älvsborgsbataljonen	Älvsborg Home Guard Battalion	Elfsborgsgruppen	
45. hvbat	Hallandsbataljonen	Halland Battalion	Hallandsgruppen	Includes an aircraft troop
46. hvbat	Södra skånska bataljonen	South Scania Battalion	Skånska gruppen	Includes a CBRN platoon
47. hvbat	Malmöhusbataljonen	Malmöhus Battalion	Skånska gruppen	Includes a traffic platoon
48. hvbat	Skånska dragonbataljonen	Scania Dragoon Battalion	Skånska gruppen	Includes a reconnaissance company
49. hvbat	Norra skånska bataljonen	North Scania Battalion	Skånska gruppen	Includes a mortar platoon

=== Swedish Home Guard organization graphic ===
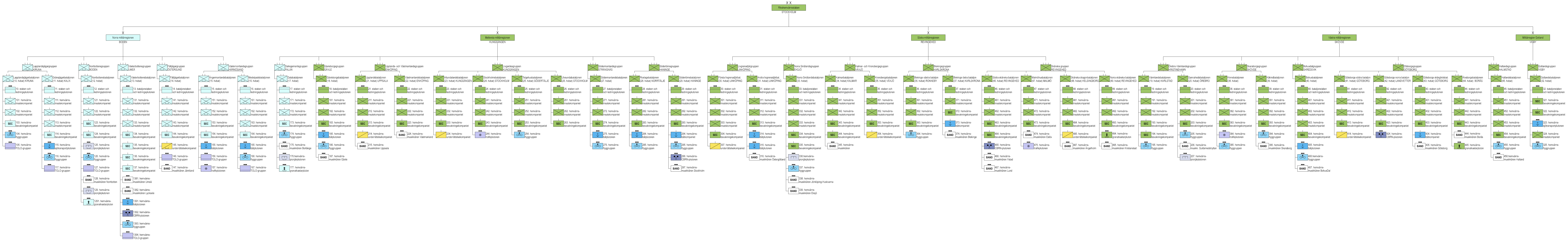
Swedish Home Guard organization as of April 2026 (click image to enlarge)

== Doctrine of Defence ==
There are two main ways to form a doctrine for defence: static and dynamic.

A static defence could for example be stationing coastal missile batteries on Gotland. No warning is needed, the equipment and staff is already in place and can hold the area. A dynamic defence could for example be stationing a coastal missile battery in conjunction with an air transport and airborne troops ready to be transported to any area if warning is given. The current doctrine MSD 16 includes elements of both strategies in synergy.

According to MSD 16 the National Security Forces are to have an increased integration with the Swedish Defence. National Defensive Force operators are stationed in the area where they live. This means they know the terrain and can more easily spot unusual activity. They will also be the first on site, with the role of detecting, reporting and if possible denying an intruder freedom of action. As first responders to any given region, they are also required to support the mobilisation of the specialised, dynamic defence.

The current organisation of the Swedish defence has highly specialised units which requires time to assemble. During this period, there would be no opposition for a forward operating resource such as an aerial troop landing. However the National Defensive Forces are stationed in the area where they live. In case of a surprise attack, the National Security Forces Handbook states that the National Defensive Forces are to become an integrated part of the dynamic response of the Swedish defence. Since each operator is stationed in the area they live in, they know the terrain, they notice when something is out of place and thus will likely be the first to detect and respond to an incursion. By using knowledge of terrain they are to deny, delay or harass the opposing force until friendly specialised units have been mobilised to the given theatre. They can also aid with this knowledge to achieve synergy in the counteroperation.

The current role of the National Security Forces is dynamic, first acting as the spearhead, first on site. After the more specialised troops have been mobilised and deployed, the role shifts to either aiding the unarmed civilian defence force and securing food, medical care and infrastructure for civilians, or fighting the invading force using asymmetric warfare and local knowledge.

== Key Tasks ==
- Assist/protect mobilisation of specialised units (Swedish Defence)
- Early intelligence
- Make use of forward operating forces difficult or impossible
- Protect key assets from sabotage and theft by qualified or unqualified actors
- Contingency: Free War Doctrine

== Protection and assistance of mobilisation of specialised units ==
The Swedish Defence units are highly specialised, but operators may live far from the given base. Mobilisation during a surprise attack could take several days. The National Defence Force (Hemvärnet) is composed of less specialised units, and each operator is assigned to a unit near their home. This makes Hemvärnet the first qualified force on site, anywhere within the national borders of Sweden. With this in mind, one of the primary roles are to protect the mobilisation of the specialised units as well as assisting through local knowledge.

The lower degree of specialisation of the National Defence Force is here a significant strength, as they are by default able to function well in the random groups that would be formed during the initial phases of a surprise attack. Each unit is expected to practice this.

== Early Intelligence ==
During the initial phases of a surprise conflict, confusion may be significant. With local knowledge, and being the first assembled force on site, the National Defence Force can provide centralised command posts with accurate intelligence. This in turn allows for a more synergistic allocation of resources, and gives a more robust situational awareness to allow for decisions. A secondary effect of accurate intelligence is giving political leaders a correct and reliable strategic situational image.

== Against Qualified Hostile Forward Operating Resource ==
- Detect and report activity to give central command accurate situation intelligence.
- Denial of Access.
- Denial of Freedom of Action.
- Denial of freedom of movement.
- Delaying field work.
- Detection of hostile forward operating elements using dogs, alarm systems, alarm mines and local knowledge.
- If opforce is detected within a key asset, certain National Security Force units have the task to re-take the key asset.
- If possible, elimination of hostile forward operating elements.
- Covert reconnaissance.
- Force reconnaissance.
- Protection of key assets from sabotage or attack.
- Destruction of key assets if undefendable. If excessive explosive loads are used for example on a concrete harbour, only gravel will be left, easily overcome by landing crafts. Destruction is in this case designed to transform the asset into large blocks forming delaying obstacles. For this purpose, special destruction tubes have been built into certain key assets.
- Protection of civilians

== Against Unqualified Opportunistic Actors ==
- Guarding key assets
- Noticing when situation deviates from normal activity, possibly indicating imminent sabotage or theft.
- Protection of civilians

For clarification: Unqualified opportunistic actors are usually divided into two groups. Criminals and political, with varying overlap.

Criminal gangs, "gangs of war", are actors who want to steal things for monetary gain. Perhaps they want weapons so they can extort locals, or perhaps they want to steal food deliveries to sell them for extremely high prices.

Politically motivated actors, who may seek to aid the invader, or seek to cause so much chaos that they're free to (for a short time) reign over an area and do whatever pleases them.

Though motivations of these may be seen as the polar opposites of each other, their modus operandi are very similar.

== Contingency ==
If all contact with friendly forces is lost, National Security Forces are to follow the "Free War" doctrine. This gives broad authority to the ranking officer and has three goals:

- Engage, delay or harass hostile forces at own discretion.
- Use any means to rejoin or contact friendly forces for synergistic effect.
- Protection of civilians

== Method of operation ==
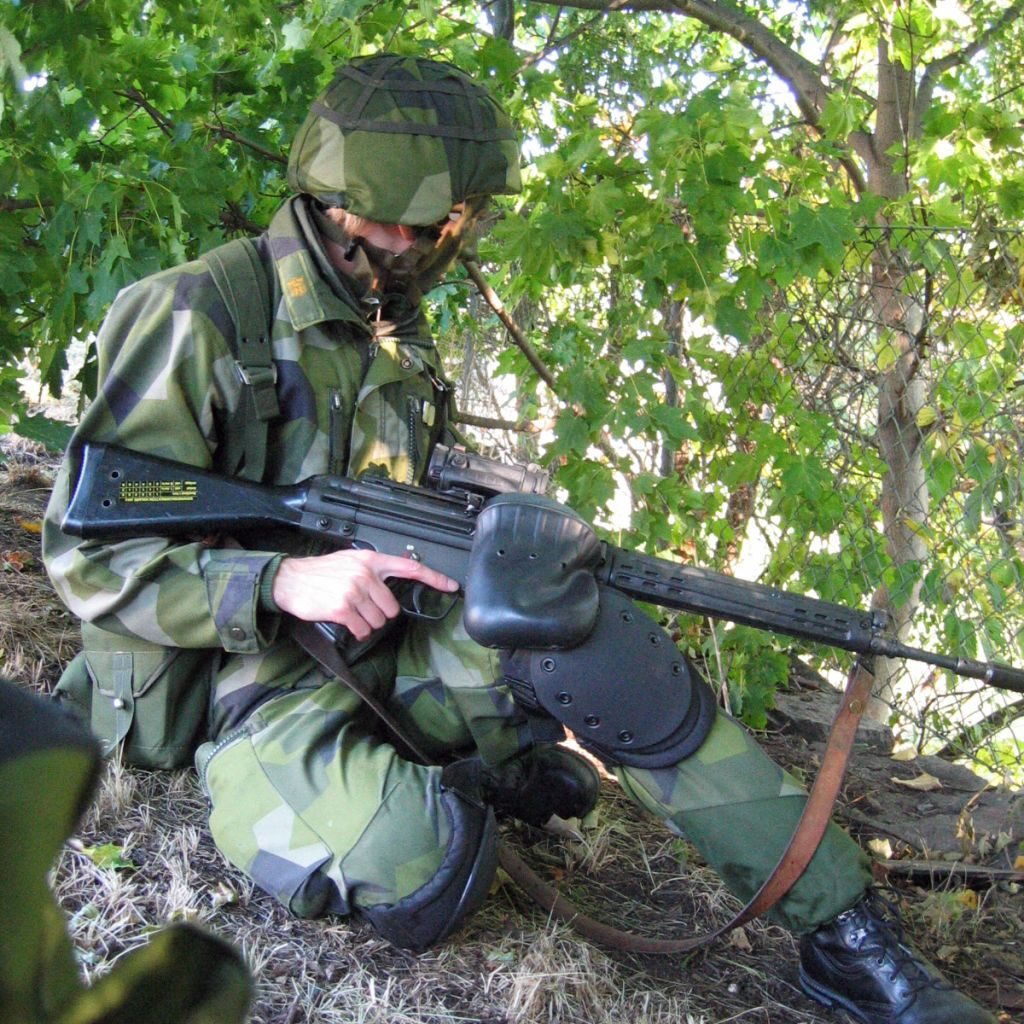
A Swedish Home Guard soldier with an Automatkarbin 4 battle rifle (Swedish-made variant of the H&K G3) with Aimpoint sight mounted

The Home Guard units are trained to be local combat units (primarily infantry but also signal troops). Although current doctrine states that Home Guard units can act anywhere within the country, local knowledge is one of the strengths of the organization. Training focuses on guard duties and weapons proficiency.

In peacetime the Home Guards main task is to help with search and rescue operations, and to provide assistance to civil society in cases of severe emergencies such as natural disasters and the like.

== Requirements ==
The Home Guard soldier must fulfill the following requirements in order to be object to admittance:

- Swedish citizenship
- Minimum 85 days of basic military training (2 weeks for specialists such as signalists, drivers, dog handlers etc. in addition to their role specific training)
- Approval of personal appraisal - personal examination by the Military Intelligence and Security department, the police and the municipal authorities - and otherwise be suitable for service
- Availability for duty in the Home Guard
- Approved "disposition right". A person who is "war placed" at another institution is required to be at that institution during an emergency or war. If, for example, a police officer applies to the National Security Forces, the unit will be denied disposition right for this applicant. The officer can still hold a peacetime role, but can not be assigned a war time placement.

Troops are trained regularly and conditions of suitability abilities tested continually.

== Training ==
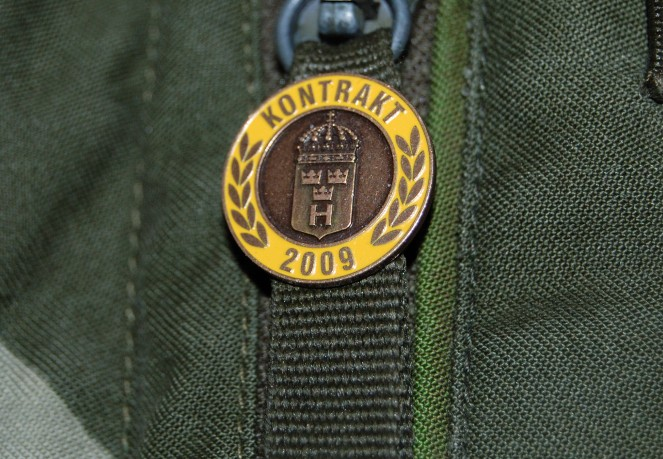
Yearmark of the Swedish Home Guard (2009)

Contractually a member of the Home Guard must train four days (before 2010 20 hours) per year up to eight days for the Rapid Response units, although the time requirement varies according to role. A prerequisite for joining the Home Guard is to have received at least 85 days of basic military training for combat roles and two weeks for certain specialist roles such as signalists, field cooks, nurses and dog handlers. The level of training varies widely, from basic military training to Ranger school.

The training is centered around two 4-day-long battalion exercises per year for the Rapid Response units and one 4-day exercise for the support units. These exercises are mandatory for all personnel. Apart from the mandatory training, the companies organize their own exercises, often up to ten weekend-long exercises a year.

== Home Guard Bands ==
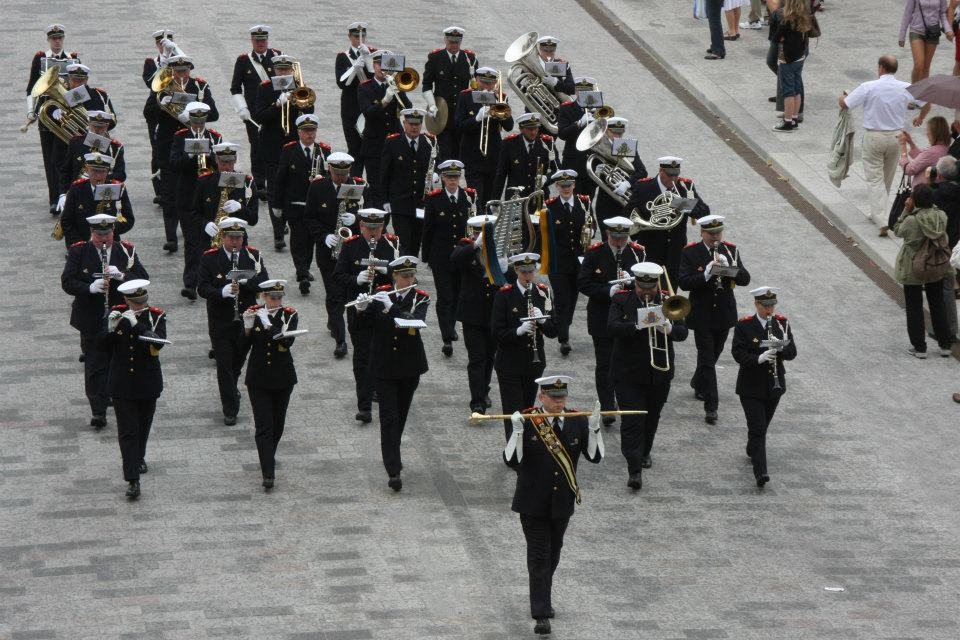
Swedish Home Guard Band of Uppsala on parade by the Royal Palace in Stockholm

Military traditions are strongly connected with military bands and marches, etc. The bands, with diverse military musicians, fulfil the task to replace professional military bands. Throughout Sweden, there are about 32 Home Guard bands which total more than 1,500 members, such as Södertörn Home Guard Band. 17 bands are qualified for performance at state ceremonies, royal visits and festivities. Aside from the bands, Home Guard Bugle Bands also are in service within their respective areas, doing tasks formerly done by the now defunct drum and bugle corps of the Armed Forces.

== Home Guard Cadets ==
The Home Guard Cadets (hemvärnsungdomar) is a youth section consisting of young girls and boys aged 15–20, typically recruited at age 15–16. The Cadets receive military training that includes base building, first aid, communications, physical training, orienteering, defence studies, basic firearms training (with .22 long rifle up to age 16 and AK4 B with red dot sight from age 17) and from age 17 and up also patrolling and leadership training (group and platoon). At 18, a Cadet is allowed to undergo battle training. Despite this they are not officially called soldiers.

Although there is no rank system for Cadets, the training consists of 4 1-year-long blocks named Basic Course, Continuation Course, Leadership Course Level 1 and Leadership Course Level 2 (Grundkurs, GK; Fortsättningskurs, FK; Ledarskapskurs 1, LK1; and Ledarskapskurs 2, LK2. LK1 and LK2 are sometimes called Practical Course, PK, and Instruktörskurs, IK which means Practical Course and Instructor Course). After 4 years as a Cadet, the 19- to 20-year-old has received military training equivalent to 85 days of basic military training, plus basic commander training.

Typically, the Cadets train one day or evening every or every other week, with 10-12 weekends per year spent in the field. The Home Guard Cadets is the "unit" who spend the most time out on the field in the whole Home Guard. During training they wear the same type of uniform and equipment as the regular forces, although it may vary between the sections depending on local budget and resources. From 2008, a Cadet at least 18 years of age who has completed at least the first three blocks of training is welcome to take a course to repeat and improve learned skills in order to serve in the regular Home Guard at age 20. This is very valuable to many of them, since many of them will not be needed in the Army, Navy or Air Force but are still eager to do military service.

== Associated organisations ==
Coat of arms of the Voluntary Flying Corps

The Home Guard also includes staff from eight voluntary organisations, so-called contractual organisations:

- Swedish Voluntary Flying Corps (FFK) – reconnaissance and transport
- Swedish Air Force Volunteers Association (FVRF) – support for the Swedish Air Force
- Swedish Parachute Association (Svenska Fallskärmsförbundet, SFF)
- Swedish Voluntary Motorcycle Corps (Frivilliga Motorcykelkåren, FMCK) – despatch riders and reconnaissance
- Swedish Voluntary Radio Organization (FRO) – Radio and telephone connection
- Swedish Working Dog Club (Svenska Brukshundklubben, SBK) – service dogs, and Crawl, searching
- Swedish Central Federation of Motor Transport Corps (Sveriges Bilkårers Riksförbund, SBR) – Transport and drivers
- Swedish Women's Voluntary Defence Organization (SLK) – rope and staff procedures
- Swedish Auxiliary Naval Corps (SVK) – Water Transport in and defence of the archipelago
- Swedish Civil Defence League (Civilförsvarsförbundet) – Educating people on how to handle various crisis situations
- Swedish Federation for Voluntary Defence Education and Training – healthcare professionals and CBRN staff
- Swedish Pistol Shooting Association (Svenska pistolskytteförbundet, SPSF)
- Swedish Shooting Sport Federation (SvSF)

== Heraldry and traditions ==
=== Colours, standards and guidons ===
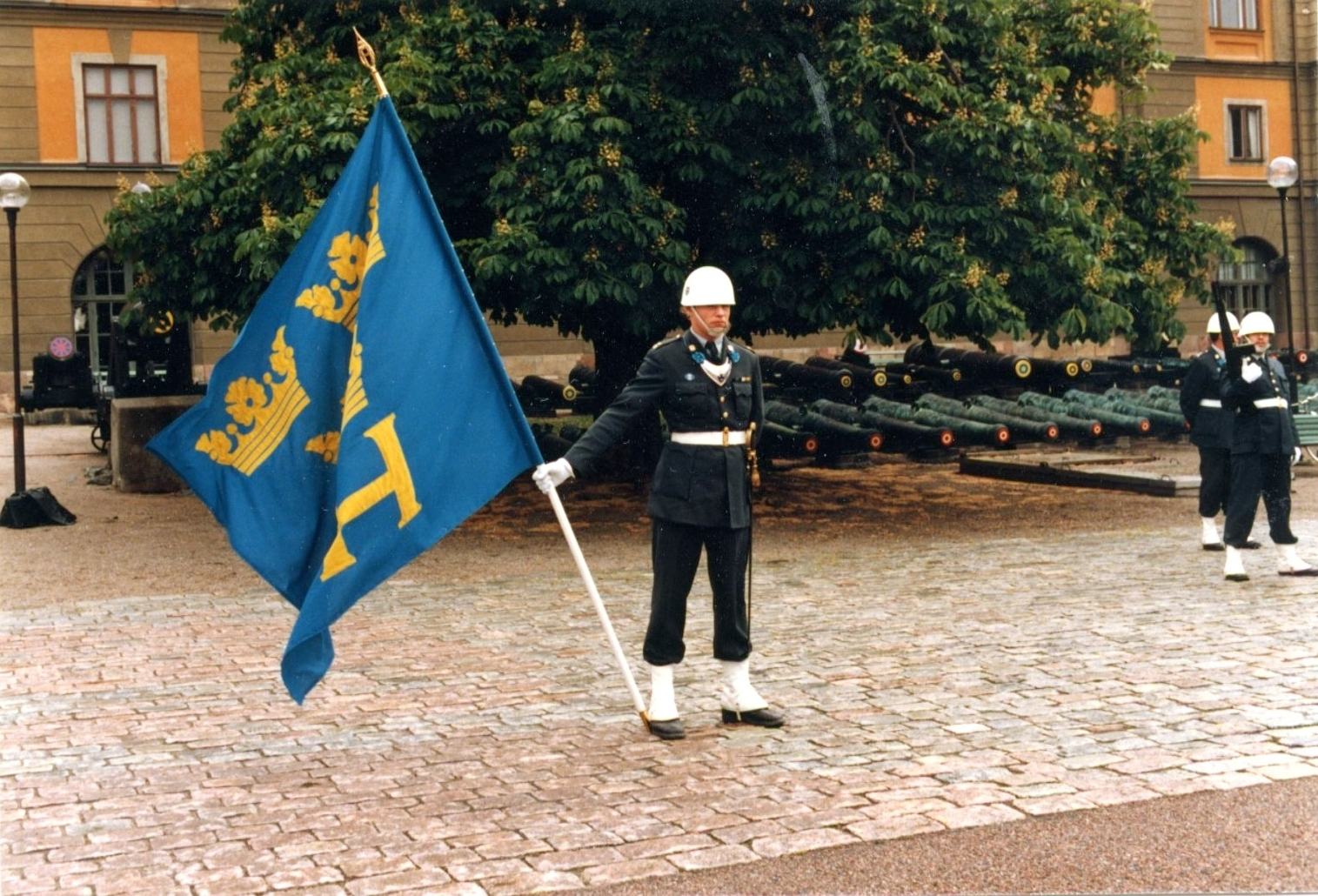
Home Guard colour in Jönköping in 1984

The first colour of the Home Guard is drawn by Ingrid Lamby and manufactured with appliqué technique by the Engelbrektsson Flag factory. The colour was presented by His Majesty the King Carl XVI Gustaf in 1995. Blazon: "On blue cloth in the centre the badge of the National Home Guard; the letter H under three open crowns placed two and one, all in yellow". The second colour of the Home Guard is a double swallow-tailed Swedish flag.

=== Coat of arms ===
The coat of the arms of the Home Guard since 1940. Blazon: "Azure, the letter H under three open crowns or, placed two and one, all or".

=== Medals ===
In 1947, the Home Guard Medal of Merit in gold (HVGM) of the 8th size was established. It was revised in 1951 and in 1974. The medal ribbon is of blue moiré with five evenly divided yellow stripes. The Home Guard Medal of Merit also comes in a silver issue (HVSM).

In 1951, the Home Guard Silver Medal (HvSM) of the 8th size was established. The reverse varies in the different defence districts or production-guards. The medal ribbon is of blue moiré with one yellow stripe on each side and two yellow stripes on the middle.

In 1996, the Hemvärnets Petrimedalj ("The Home Guard Petri Medal") in silver and bronze (HvPetriSM/BM) of the 8th size was established. It was revised in 2001. The medal ribbon is of green moiré with broad blue edges and with a yellow line in the middle of the blue fields. The ribbon is attached to a narrow pole carried by two slanting ornaments of leaves.

In 2006, the Home Guard Bronze Medal (HvBM) of the 8th size was established. The medal is exactly the same in design as the Home Guard Silver Medal, but is embossed in bronze. The ribbon of blue moiré pattern with two vertical yellow, two mm wide stripes in the middle. The number of awards is marked with metal stars on the ribbon and ribbon bar.

In 2019, the Home Guard Service Medal (HVtjgSM/GM/GMmemalj) of the 8th size was established. The award is given to a Home Guard soldiers, Home Guard musicians and volunteer staff with a valid Home Guard contract and to those who remain in the Home Guard as a Home Guard veteran. The medal is made of three denominations: silver, gold and gold with enamel.

In addition to these medals, the Association of Home Guard Officers (Hemvärnsbefälets Riksförbund, HBR) awards the Association of Home Guard Officers Royal Medal since 1996 (silver medal since 2018) and the Association of Home Guard Officers Merit Badge since 1991.

=== Other ===
On 4 November 1946, the march "Hemvärnets marsch" (Damberg) was adopted, that in connection with a prize competition.

== Chief of Home Guard ==
The Chief of Home Guard is the commanding officer of the Home Guard:

=== Hemvärnschefer ===
- 1940-07-01 – 1952-03-31: Gustaf Petri
- 1947-04-01 – 1948-06-30: Sven-Erik Allstrin

=== Rikshemvärnschefer ===
- 1948-07-01 – 1952-03-31: Sven-Erik Allstrin
- 1952-04-01 – 1955-09-30: Gunnar Brinck
- 1955-10-01 – 1968-09-30: Per Kellin
- 1968-10-01 – 1971-09-30: Karl Gustaf Brandberg
- 1971-10-01 – 1980-12-31: Fredrik Löwenhielm
- 1981-01-01 – 1983-09-30: Karl Eric Holm
- 1983-10-01 – 1988-03-01: Robert Lugn
- 1988-04-01 – 1988-09-30: Lars-Eric Wahlgren
- 1988-10-01 – 1994-03-31: Reinhold Lahti
- 1994-04-31 – 1997-09-30: Jan-Olof Borgén
- 1997-10-01 – 2000-06-30: Alf Sandqvist
- 2000-07-01 – 2002-09-30: Mats Welff
- 2002-10-01 – 2005-06-30: Anders Lindström
- 2005-07-01 – 2018-08-30: Roland Ekenberg
- 2018-09-01 – 2022-09-30: Stefan Sandborg
- 2022-10-01 – 2026-01-08: Laura Swaan Wrede
- 2026-01-09 – present: Mattias Ardin

== Names, designations and locations ==
Name	Translation	From		To
Hemvärnet	Home Guard	1940-05-29	–	
Designation		From		To
Hv		1940-05-29	–	
Location		From		To
Stockholm Garrison		1940-05-29	–	
