= Swedish Voluntary Radio Organization =

Voluntary signals auxiliary of the Swedish Home Guard

- Frivilliga radioorganisationen
- FRO coat of arms
- Abbreviation: FRO
- Formation: 1946; 80 years ago
- Region served: Sweden
- Website: fro.se

The Swedish Voluntary Radio Organization (Swedish: Frivilliga radioorganisationen, FRO) is a Swedish volunteer defense organization (a signals auxiliary) that aims to maintain and develop excellence in Communications and Information systems (Information Technology - and radio communication). FRO trains radio operators, technicians, squad leaders and communications staff for the Swedish Home Guard and civilian operators for the Swedish Civil Defence and Resilience Agency, the Swedish Transport Administration and the Svenska Kraftnät (the Swedish electricity and natural gas transmission system operator).

The organisation has a coat of arms with the following blazon: “The blue field is a forked flash of gold with the tips pointing at the shield head and foot.”

== See also ==
- Home Guard
- Swedish Voluntary Flying Corps
- Swedish Auxiliary Naval Corps
