= Södertörn Home Guard Band =

Military band in Sweden

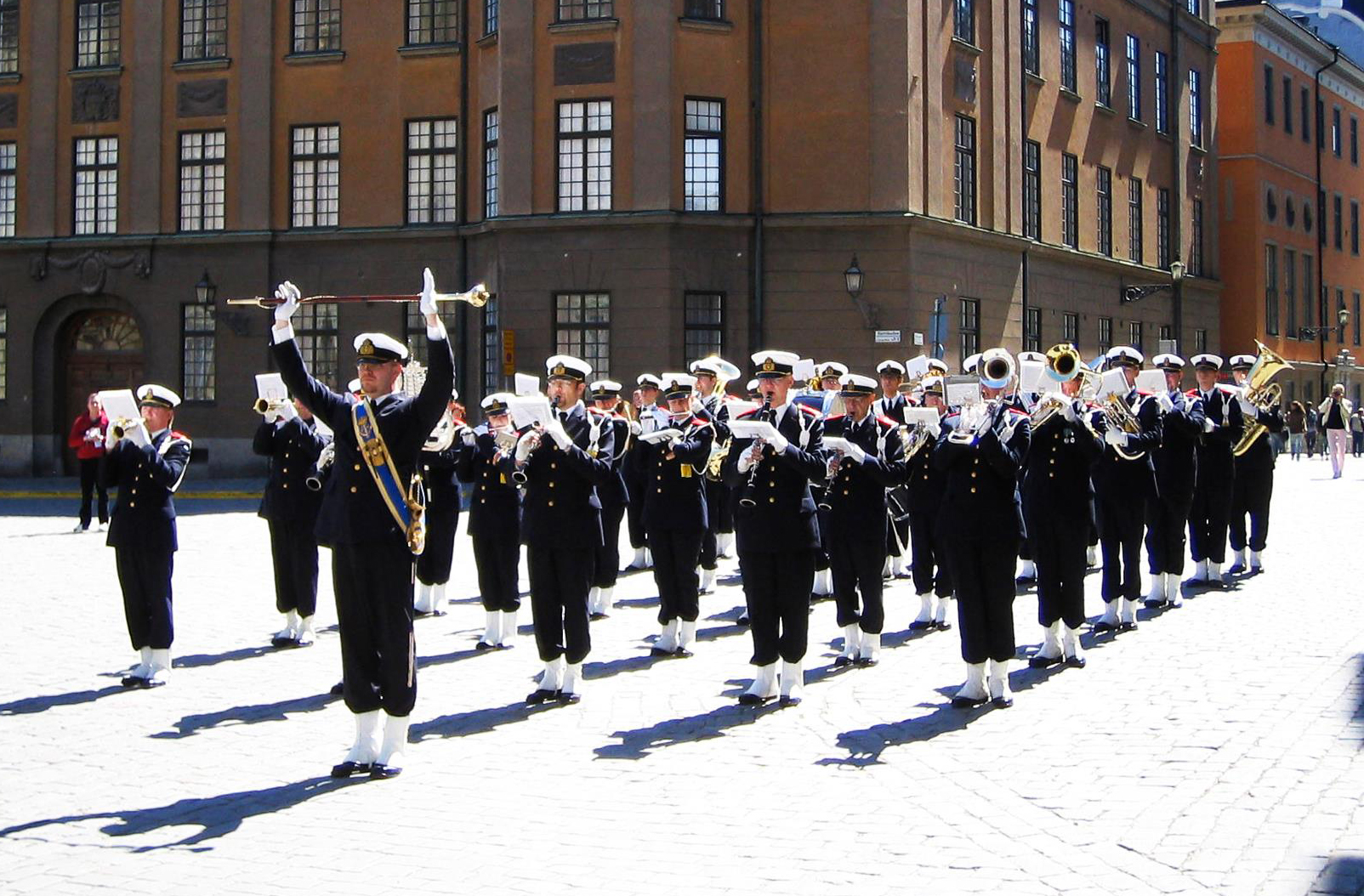
Södertörn Home Guard Band after the Changing of the Guard ceremony in Stockholm.

Södertörn Home Guard Band (Swedish: Hemvärnets musikkår Södertörn) is a military band in the Swedish Home Guard. It is affiliated with the 1st Marine Regiment based at Berga Naval Base outside Stockholm.

== History ==
A proposal was made in 1973 to have a Home Guard band in the Österhaninge Home Guard area. The establishment of this unit was supported by the Home Guard Department at the Vaxholm defense area including the Home Guard Staff. The original title was the Handen Home Guard Band (Sw: Hemvärnets Musikkår Handen). The first performance took place on 21 September 1973.

During the 1970s and 1980s the band's title changed to the Haninge Home Guard Band (Sw: Hemvärnets Musikkår Haninge), the Haninge Fleet Forces Band (Sw: Flottans musikkår Handen) and the Haninge Air Force Band (Sw: Flygvapnets musikkår Handen) during the 1980s. In 1994, the band's status changed from that of a Home Guard band to being the Sjövärnskårens musikkår (En: Band of the Swedish Naval Volunteers). From 1978-2002 the Bandmaster was Major Sverker Hållander. Under his leadership the band played at several military tattoos, where it became well known for innovative and distinctive figurative programs. Several well-received concerts and other performances took place outside Sweden.

On 14 December 2010 the Swedish Home Guard Chief Brigadier General Roland Ekenberg decided that the unit should resume the status of a Home Guard Band, after having participated in an inspection of the Armed Forces Music held at the Life Guards in Stockholm. The band received its new title of Södertörn Home Guard Band on 1 January 2011.

== Organization ==
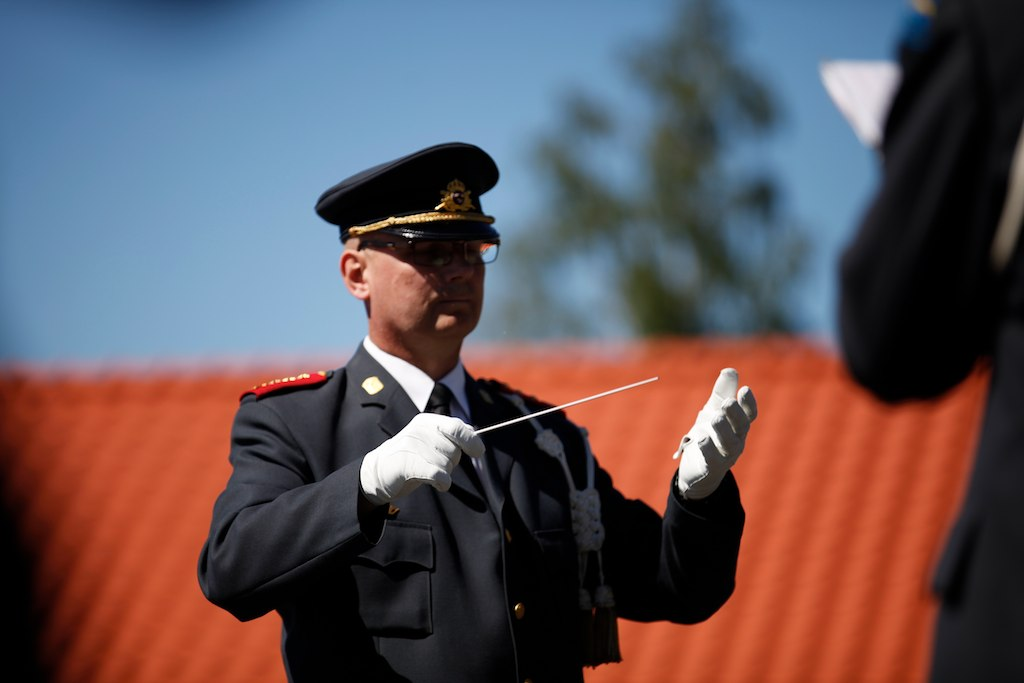

The band currently consists of 45 active musicians. On parade, the unit often consists of up to 30 musicians and can perform figurative programs. The band members are volunteers, including leisure musicians, music college students, music teachers, professional military musicians and former military music conscripts. The band maintains Swedish musical traditions, using Swedish instruments such as the E flat cornet, B cornet and valve trombone.

The band currently belongs to the 29th Home Guard Battalion at the Södertörn Training Wing, which is a part of the 1st Marine Regiment based outside Stockholm. At performances and representational functions the band wears a dress M1987 uniform, as authorized for the Amphibious Corps and including their rank insignia. It is the same uniform as that used by the 1st Marine Regiment except for the addition of red shoulder straps and a distinctive shoulder ornament. During parades, the band also wears white spats.

The band is authorized to play at the Changing of the Guards ceremony in Stockholm and during official functions both in Sweden and abroad. When not playing as a Home Guard Band, the unit is called Södertörn Symphonic Band. The present Music Director is Lieutenant Anders Alhbin.

=== Music Directors ===
- Sverker Hållander (1978–2002)
- Björn Ericsson (2002)
- Gustav Lundström (2002–2008)
- Anders Alhbin (2008-)

== Performances ==
The band has participated in the following events and tattoos:

- Stockholm Military Tattoo, Stockholm, Sweden (2010)
- Ystad International Tattoo, Ystad, Sweden (2011)
- Virginia International Tattoo, Norfolk, USA (2014)
- Musikschau der Nationen, Bremen, Germany (2015)
