= Association of Home Guard Officers Royal Medal =

Swedish medal

Association of Home Guard Officers Merit Badge
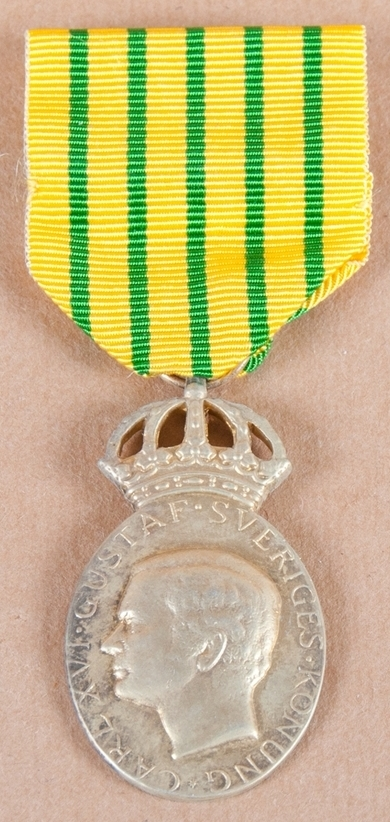
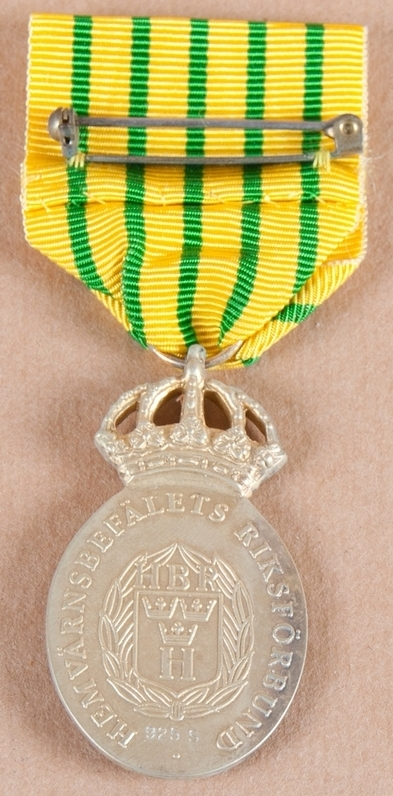
- Obverse Reverse The silver medal
- Type: Semi-official medal (Note: Category K of semi-official medals include, with His Majesty the King's permission established and with his approval, medals (badges) awarded by various organizations. The medals has often the king's image on the obverse.)
- Awarded for: Meritorious activities for the Association of Home Guard Officers
- Country: Sweden
- Presented by: Association of Home Guard Officers
- Eligibility: Swedish personnel
- Status: Currently awarded
- Established: 1996 (gold medal); 2018 (silver medal)
- Ribbon bar

Precedence
- Next (lower): Association of Home Guard Officers Merit Badge

The Association of Home Guard Officers Royal Medal (Swedish: Hemvärnsbefälets Riksförbunds kungliga medalj, HBRGM/ HBRSM) is a Swedish medal established in 1996 by the Association of Home Guard Officers (Hemvärnsbefälets Riksförbund, HBR). It is awarded for meritorious activities for the association and very glorious deeds for the association.

== History ==
The Association of Home Guard Officers Royal Medal in gold was established in 1996. In 2018, a new version in silver was established. The statutes for this were adopted on 30 September 2018.

== Appearance ==
=== Medal ===
The medals in gold and silver are oval (elliptical) in shape and are crowned with a royal crown and on the obverse provided with His Majesty the King's image and the text CARL XVl GUSTAF THE KING OF SWEDEN. On the reverse, there is a sign with three crowns and the letter H inside the wreath and the letters HBR (HBR's logo). Around this is the text HEMVÄRNSBEFÄLETS RIKSFÖRBUND ("Association of Home Guard Officers"). The medals are HBR's foremost medal in gold and the second foremost medal in silver.

The gold medal is minted in gold (gilded silver) is of a size corresponding to the 8th size. The silver medal is minted in silver is of a size corresponding to the 8th size.

=== Ribbon ===
The ribbon is of yellow moiré pattern with five evenly divided 2mm green stripes.

== Criteria ==
One can be awarded royal medal of merit in gold after a very meritorious active activity for the association and a particularly glorious deed for the association.

One can be awarded royal medal of merit in after very meritorious activity for the association and very glorious deed for the association.

To be awarded the gold medal of merit, the Association of Home Guard Officers Merit Badge should have been received approximately 3 years earlier.

== Presenting ==
The federal board of the Association of Home Guard Officers (HBR) decides on awarding, as does the number of merit medals that are awarded annually. As the medals are HBR's two highest awards, a restrictive awarding policy is applied. Over a period of ten years, an average of 5 gold medals/year and 8 silver medals/year is the guideline value for awarding. The right to make proposals belongs to members of the federal board and association boards. The application for an approved form is submitted to HBR's federal board and submitted to the association's medal administrator. If several people from the same association are proposed at the same time, the order of priority must be stated. The application must be accompanied by a copy of the association board's minutes or a certified extract from the minutes of the decision.

HBR's federal board has by His Majesty the King been authorized to decide on the awarding. The decision cannot be appealed. The medals are presented in solemn forms. The federal noard registers awarded medals.

== Wearing ==
The medals are worn on ribbons of yellow color with five vertical 2 mm greens stripes. The stripes are evenly distributed on the ribbon. The medal comes with a diploma. The medals of merit are also available in miniature. For those who have received the medal of merit in gold, a pin of the Association of Home Guard Officers Merit Badge will be added to mount on the ribbon bar.

== See also ==
- Association of Home Guard Officers Merit Badge
