= Home Guard Bronze Medal =

- Type: Category L-medal (Note: Category L includes merit badges or remembrance instituted by the Swedish Armed Forces' organizational units (units, centers and schools), the Home Guard and voluntary defense organizations. The category also includes previously granted carrying permits for e.g. officers 'unions (equivalent) and military associations (kamratföreningar) as well as other badges that have been approved by Swedish Armed Forces Headquarters.)
- Awarded for: Valuable service contributed to developing the Home Guard
- Country: Sweden
- Presented by: Home Guard
- Eligibility: Swedish personnel
- Status: Currently awarded
- Established: 2006
- Ribbon bar

The Home Guard Bronze Medal (Swedish: Hemvärnets bronsmedalj, HvBM) is a Swedish reward medal established in 2006 by the National Home Guard Council (Rikshemvärnsrådet). It is awarded for valuable service contributed to the development of the Home Guard.

== History ==
The Home Guard Bronze Medal was instituted in 2006 by the National Home Guard Council (Rikshemvärnsrådet). The Home Guard Bronze Medal is primarily instituted to encourage all personnel in the Home Guard to contribute to the Home Guard in addition to what is required in the service. It is the task of the Home Guard unit commander to annually evaluate the efforts made by individuals in the unit and propose suitable persons for the award. A person can receive the medal a maximum of three times.

== Appearance ==
The Home Guard Bronze Medal is exactly the same in design as the Home Guard Silver Medal, but is embossed in bronze and in a size corresponding to the eighth size. The ribbon of blue moiré pattern with two vertical yellow, two mm wide stripes in the middle. The number of awards is marked with metal stars on the ribbon and ribbon bar.

== Criteria ==
Awarded to those who through valuable service have contributed to developing the Home Guard, in addition to what the service requires.

== Quantity ==
There is no limit to the number of bronze medals that may be awarded. One and the same person can be awarded the medal a maximum of three times, with two stars on the medal ribbon for the second time and with three stars for the third time.

== Presenting ==
Decisions on awarding are made by the Home Guard Council (Hemvärnsråd). List of awarded medals and denominations are kept at the awarding unit (training group). The Central Music Council (Centrala musikrådet) decides on awardings for Home Guard musicians. Redeemed at cost price together with other costs for a bronze medal is paid by the relevant Home Guard Council or by gift funds according to a decision by the relevant Home Guard Council. The bronze medal is presented during a ceremony together with a diploma.
