= Swedish Home Guard Medal of Merit =

Swedish medal

Home Guard Medal of Merit
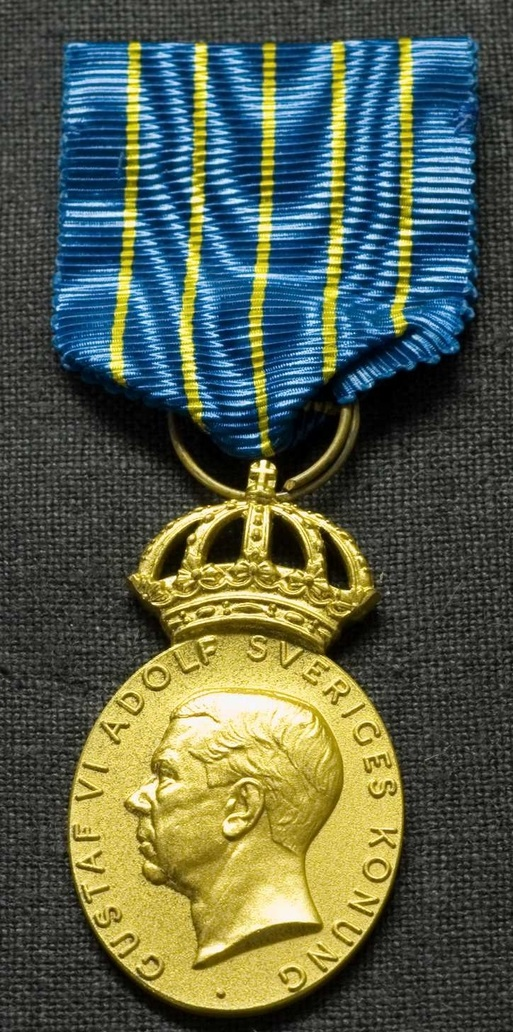
- The medal in gold.
- Type: Semi-official medal (Note: Semi-official medals include, with His Majesty the King's permission established and with his approval, medals (badges) awarded by various organizations. The medals has often the king's image on the obverse.)
- Awarded for: Particularly significant service
- Country: Sweden
- Presented by: Home Guard
- Eligibility: Swedish and foreign personnel
- Status: Currently awarded
- Established: 1947
- Ribbon bar

Home Guard Medal of Merit (Swedish: Hemvärnets förtjänstmedalj, HVGM & HVSM) is a Swedish reward medal established in 1947 by the National Home Guard Council. It is awarded to those who, through significant service, have contributed to developing the Home Guard in addition to what the service requires.

== History ==
The Home Guard Medal of Merit in gold was instituted in 1947 by the National Home Guard Council (Rikshemvärnsrådet) with His Majesty the King's approval. The Home Guard Medal of Merit in silver was instituted according to His Majesty the King's authorization by the National Home Guard Council.

== Appearance ==
The Home Guard Medal of Merit is issued in two designs, gold and silver. It has an oval shape and is of the 8th size. The ribbon is of blue moiré pattern with five evenly divided yellow stripes.

=== Gold medal ===
The gold medal has an oval (elliptical) shape and is crowned with a royal crown and on the obverse provided with His Majesty the King's image and on the reverse with the Home Guard emblem. The medal is minted in gold in a size corresponding to the 8th size.

=== Silver medal ===
The silver medal has an oval (elliptical) shape and is crowned with a royal crown and on the obverse provided with His Majesty the King's image and on the reverse with the Home Guard emblem. The medal is minted in a size corresponding to the 8th size.

=== Ribbon ===
The ribbon is of blue moiré pattern with five evenly divided two mm wide yellow stripes.

== Criteria ==
=== Gold medal ===
Awarded to those who, through particularly significant service has contributed to developing the Home Guard in addition to what the service requires.

=== Silver medal ===
Awarded to those who, through very significant service, have contributed to developing the Home Guard in addition to what the service requires.

== Presenting ==
The Home Guard Council (Hemvärnsråd) applies to the National Home Guard Council (Rikshemvärnsrådet) for the awarding of medals of merit. The application must be received by the National Home Guard Council annually no later than 1 July for a dividend next year, medals of merit in gold are awarded in connection with the National Home Guard Council every odd year. The National Home Guard Council decides individually in each individual proposal on the award of a medal of merit. The medal is presented during a ceremony together with a diploma. The National Home Guard Council is responsible for the costs.

The merit medal can also be awarded to a foreign citizen for special reasons.

== Wearing ==
The medal is a so-called semi-official medal of category K. A semi-official medal includes, with His Majesty the King's permission instituted and with his approval, medals (badges) awarded by various organizations. The medals has often the king's image on the obverse (in this case His Majesty the King Gustaf VI Adolf). These types of medals are worn after category J (semi-official orders of chivalry).
