= Northern Military District (MD N) =

- Norra militärdistriktet
- Active: 2000–2005
- Country: Sweden
- Allegiance: Swedish Armed Forces
- Branch: Joint service
- Type: Military district
- Role: Operational, territorial and tactical operations
- Part of: Swedish Armed Forces Headquarters
- Garrison/HQ: Boden
- Colors: Yellow and blue
- March: "Norrlandsfärger" (Widkvist) (Note: The march was adopted in 2000 and was established on 27 November 2002. It was previously used by the Northern Military District (Milo N) from 1994 to 2000.)

The Northern Military District (Swedish: Norra militärdistriktet, MD N) was a military district within the Swedish Armed Forces from 2000 to 2005. Its staff was located in Boden Garrison in Boden, Sweden. The military district included Västernorrland, Jämtland, Västerbotten and Norrbotten counties.

== History ==
Prior to the Defence Act of 2000, the Swedish government in its bill to the Riksdag proposed that the tactical level should be reduced by the decommissioning of divisional and defence district staffs as well as naval commands and air commands. This in order to design an Army Tactical Command, Navy Tactical Command and Air Force Tactical Command which would be co-located with the Joint Operations Command (Operationsledningen, OpL). The proposal meant that all territorial staffs would be disbanded, which meant, among other things, the decommissioning of military district staffs. Instead, on 1 July 2000, four military districts were formed, which in principle corresponded geographically to the former military districts (1966–1990s). The big difference was that the military district was the lowest level at which the commander was territorially responsible. In the military districts, military district groups (militärdistriktsgrupp) were organized after the previous division of defence district, which in the Northern Military District corresponded to seven military district groups.

Prior to the Defence Act of 2004, the Swedish government proposed to the ääRiksdagää, on a proposal from the Swedish Armed Forces, to reduce the number of military district groups, where the military district groups in Kalix and Sollefteå within the Northern Military District were proposed to be disbanded. According to the Swedish Armed Forces, fewer Home Guard units would be organized, but better trained and fulfilled units. The Defence Act meant that Norrbottens gränsjägargrupp and the Västernorrlandsgruppen were disbanded on 30 June 2005, and its tasks were taken over on 1 July 2005 by the Lapplandsjägargruppen and the Härnösandsgruppen, respectively. Furthermore, Gotland Military District (MD G) was also disbanded, which meant that the Gotlandsgruppen was transferred from 1 January 2005 to the Central Military District.

Prior to the Defence Act, the Swedish Armed Forces had proposed three alternatives to a changed military district organization. The first course of action was to maintain the military district organization. The second course of action would be to merge the military district staff with a training unit. The third course of action would be to disband the military district organization and transfer responsibility for the territorial operations to the Joint Forces Command (OPIL). That a change in the military district organization was necessary was shared by both the government, the Swedish Armed Forces and the Swedish Parliamentary Defence Commission (Försvarsberedningen). Both the government and the Defence Commission felt that the issue needed further consideration before a parliamentary decision was possible. The government's main alternative, however, was that the organization should be disbanded.

On 2 June 2005, the Swedish government presented its bill (2004/05:160) on the decommissioning of the military district organization. In the bill, the government referred to that "In the future "operational defence" (Swedish: insatsförsvar) and the decided operational organization, there is no longer a requirement or need for regional or territorial command that justifies a specific command organization". In this way, the government considered that the military district organization could be disbanded, which was also proposed by the Swedish Armed Forces in a petition to the government on 7 March 2005. Instead, four management groups for security service and collaboration would be set up, where the management groups would be located to Boden, Stockholm, Gothenburg and Malmö. On 16 November 2005, the Riksdag decided that the military district organization should be disbanded on 31 December 2005, which meant that the military district groups were reorganized into training groups (utbildningsgrupper) and subordinated to a training unit (utbildningsförband). As a result, all military district groups were transferred from the Northern Military District (MD N) and became subordinated from 1 January 2006 of the Norrbotten Regiment (I 19).

The disbandment was manifested through a ceremony on 21 December 2005. The ceremony was led by the commander of the Northern Military District, Major General Björn Anderson. During this ceremony, the responsibility for the Home Guard and volunteer activities was handed over to the commander of Norrbotten Regiment. The ceremony was attended by, among others, the Supreme Commander of the Swedish Armed Forces, General Håkan Syrén and the governors from the four northernmost counties. From 21 December 2005, the Chief of Operations at the Swedish Armed Forces Headquarters took over military territorial responsibility. From 1 January 2006, the Northern Military District transitioned to a decommissioning organization, which operated until 30 June 2006.

== Units ==
=== 2000–2004 ===
- Härnösandsgruppen, Härnösand
- Jämtlandsgruppen, Östersund
- Lapplandsjägargruppen, Kiruna.
- Norrbottensgruppen, Boden.
- Norrbottens gränsjägargrupp, Kalix.
- Västerbottensgruppen, Umeå.
- Västernorrlandsgruppen, Sollefteå.

=== 2005–2005 ===
On 1 January and 1 July 2005, a new organization was adopted, when the military district group in Kalix was disbanded on 31 December 2004 and the one in Sollefteå was disbanded on 30 June 2005. On 1 July the Härnösandsgruppen adopted the name Västernorrlandsgruppen.

- Västernorrlandsgruppen, Härnösand
- Fältjägargruppen, Östersund
- Lapplandsjägargruppen, Kiruna
- Norrbottensgruppen, Boden
- Västerbottensgruppen, Umeå

== Barracks ==
The staff was located at Norrbottensvägen 6 in Boden. In connection with the formation of the Northern Military District on 1 July 2000, the staff building erected in the 1960s was taken over by the then Upper Norrland Military District (Milo ÖN). The staff building is erected in direct connection with the Commandant's Building (Kommendantsbyggnaden), and erected in three composite wings. When the Upper Norrland Military District (Milo NN) and Lower Norrland Military District (Milo NN) were amalgamated, the property was taken over by the Northern Military District (Milo N). On 1 July 2000, the property was taken over by the Northern Military District. After the Northern Military District was disbanded and decommissioned in 2005, the property was taken over by, among other things, the Security and Cooperation Section of Boden (Säkerhets- och samverkanssektion Boden).

== Heraldry and traditions ==
=== Coat of arms ===
The coat of the arms of the Northern Military District Staff (Milo N) 1994–2000, and the Northern Military District Staff (MD N) 2000–2005. Blazon: "Azure, the provincial badge of Västerbotten, a reindeer courant, armed gules, followed by a mullet, both argent. The shield surmounted an erect sword or".

=== Colours, standards and guidons ===
The command flag of the commanding officer of the Northern Military District is drawn by Kristina Holmgård-Åkerberg and embroidered by hand in insertion technique by the company Libraria. Blazon: "On blue cloth an erect yellow sword; in the first corner a white reindeer at speed armed red, followed by a white mullet".

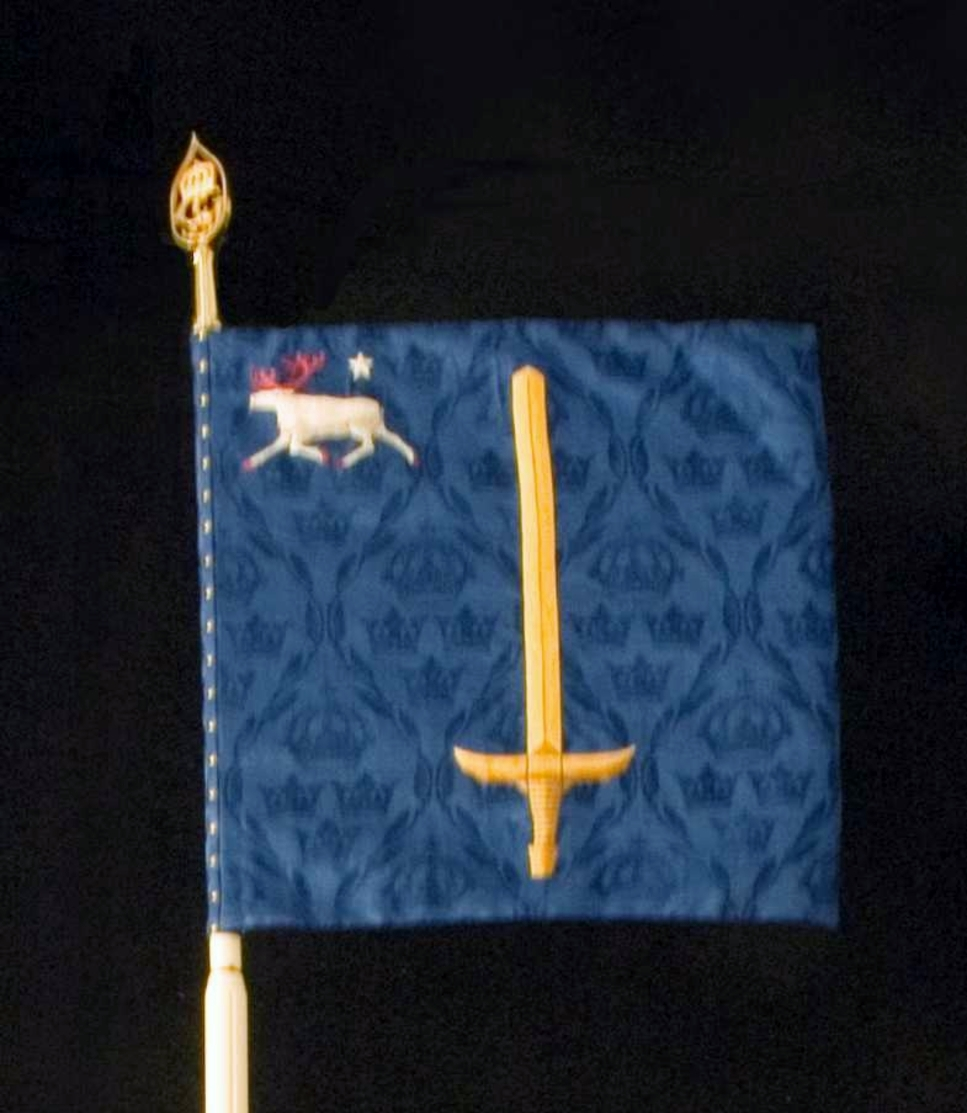
Command flag

=== Medals ===
In 2005, the Norra militärdistriktets minnesmedalj ("Northern Military District Commemorative Medal") in bronze (MDNMBM) of the 8th size was established. The medal ribbon is divided into blue and yellow. In the blue field three yellow lines and in the yellow field one blue line. A miniature of the coat of arms of the district is attached to the ribbon.

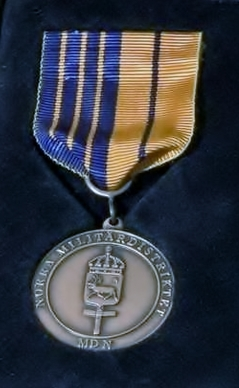
The Northern Military District Commemorative Medal.

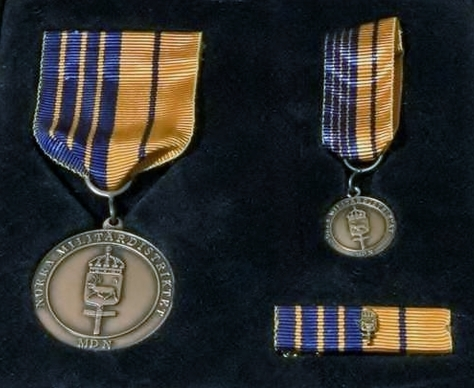
Medal, ribbon and miniature of the Northern Military District Commemorative Medal.

== Commanding officers ==
=== Military district commanders ===
- 2000–2002: Major general Jan Frank
- 2003–2005: Major general Björn Anderson

=== Chiefs of staff ===
- 2000–2004: Senior colonel Ulf Nordlander
- 2004–2005: Colonel Thommy Göransson

== Names, designations and locations ==
Name	Translation	From		To
Norra militärdistriktet	Northern Military District	2000-07-01	–	2005-12-31
Avvecklingsorganisation	Decommissioning Organisation	2006-01-01	–	2006-06-30
Designation		From		To
MD N		2000-07-01	–	2004-12-31
Location		From		To
Boden Garrison		2000-07-01	–	2005-12-31
