= Reinhold Lahti =

Swedish Army officer

- Born: 3 June 1930; Kukkola, Sweden
- Died: 20 March 2002 (aged 71); Stockholm, Sweden
- Military career
- Allegiance: Sweden
- Branch: Swedish Army
- Service years: 1954–1994
- Rank: Major General
- Commands: Gotland Artillery Regiment; Boden Artillery Regiment; Boden Defence District; Commendant in Boden; Chief of Home Guard

Major General Reinhold Lahti (3 June 1930 – 20 March 2002) was a Swedish Army officer. During his career, Lahti attended the Military Academy Karlberg and received his officer's commission in 1954. He continued his education at the Swedish Armed Forces Staff College, rising to the rank of captain and serving at various regiments. He then joined the General Staff Corps, completing additional training in the United States and eventually becoming a lieutenant colonel. Later, he was promoted to colonel and appointed as a regiment commander. In his role as Chief of Home Guard, he implemented significant changes, such as allowing women with military training to join, providing a free magazine to all personnel, and expanding the Home Guard's capabilities. He held this position until his retirement in March 1994.

== Early life ==
Lahti was born on 3 June 1930 in the village of Kukkola in Karl Gustav Parish, Norrbotten County, the son of Arvo Lahti and his wife Elsa (née Ojala). His father earned a living as a log driver during the summers. Reinhold was the eldest among 13 siblings and initially only spoke Finnish. He was nine years old when World War II broke out, and when the Finns, towards the end of the war, drove out the German troops who were burning and ravaging northern Finland, he witnessed the war on the other side of the Torne River. He chose the military path because it was his only chance to receive higher education. He became a volunteer at the Norrbotten Artillery Corps in Boden in 1946. On 12 May 1953, he passed the studentexamen at the Swedish Armed Forces School for Secondary Education in Uppsala.

== Career ==
Lahti attended the Military Academy Karlberg in Stockholm from 1953 to 1954. He was commissioned as an officer the same year. Lahti attended the Swedish Armed Forces Staff College technical program from 1961 to 1963, was promoted to captain in 1964, and then served at the Boden Artillery Regiment. He became a captain in the Swedish Army Ordnance Corps in 1965, served with the Technical Staff Corps (Tekniska stabskåren) from 1966 to 1968, and at his home regiment from 1969 to 1970. Lahti became a major in the Technical Staff Corps in 1970. After that, he worked as a teacher and course leader at the Swedish Armed Forces Staff College and was promoted to lieutenant colonel in 1972.

Lahti served in the General Staff Corps from 1965 to 1978, completed the Defence Management Systems Course in the United States in 1967, and became lieutenant colonel in the General Staff Corps on 1 October 1974. Lahti served as head of the Equipment Department in the Army Staff from 1976 to 1978 and attended the Swedish National Defence College in 1977. He was promoted to colonel and appointed commander of the Gotland Artillery Regiment on 1 October 1978. Lahti then served as commander of Boden Artillery Regiment and Defence District Commander of Boden Defence District (Fo 63) from 1980 to 1983, and attended the Swedish National Defence College's chief course in 1983. He was promoted to major general in 1983 and was appointed head of the main department for common technical matters at the Swedish Defence Materiel Administration, based at Karolinen in Karlstad.

He served as the Acting Chief of Home Guard from 1 July 1988, until September 1991, when he became the permanent chief. During his time as the Chief of Home Guard, several important decisions were made. These decisions included allowing women with military basic training to become members of the Home Guard. Additionally, all Home Guard personnel were provided with the magazine Tidningen Hemvärnet at no cost to the individual. The Home Guard Staff moved to new facilities near the Swedish Armed Forces Headquarters in Stockholm. The personnel strength of the Home Guard was established at 125,000 individuals, and the concept of "defence district aviation" was introduced. The Home Guard Museum at the National Home Guard Combat School was reopened, and Home Guard personnel began to receive the Uniform System 90. The Home Guard Council (Rikshemvärnsrådet) was formed, merging with the former Central Trustee Board of the Home Guard (Hemvärnets Centrala förtroendenämnd), and experimental training for women auxiliary personnel for the Home Guard was initiated. Lahti held this position until his retirement on 31 March 1994.

== Personal life ==
In 1955, Lahti married Ulla Mariette Hellhoff (1931–2009), the daughter of Robert Hellhoff and Märta (née Lindberg). They had two children: Jenny and Henrik. He was interred on 15 April 2002 at Skogskyrkogården in Stockholm.

== Dates of rank ==
- 1954 – Second lieutenant
- ???? – Lieutenant
- 1964 – Captain
- 1970 – Major
- 1972 – Lieutenant colonel
- 1 October 1978 – Colonel
- 1980 – Senior colonel
- 1983 – Major general

== Awards and decorations ==
- (Sweden) Knight of the Order of the Sword (6 June 1972)
- (Sweden) Swedish Women's Voluntary Defence Organization Royal Medal of Merit (March 1990)
- (Sweden) Swedish Women Drivers Association Medal of Merit in silver (Sveriges kvinnliga bilkårers riksförbunds förtjänstmedalj i silver) (November 1990)

Military offices
Preceded by Carl Areskoug	Gotland Artillery Regiment; 1978–1980	Succeeded by Helge Gard
Preceded by Sven Skeppstedt	Boden Artillery Regiment Boden Defence District; 1980–1983	Succeeded by Thure Wadenholt
Preceded by Lars-Eric Wahlgren	Chief of Home Guard; 1988–1994	Succeeded by Jan-Olof Borgén
