= Roland Ekenberg =

Swedish Army officer (born 1957)

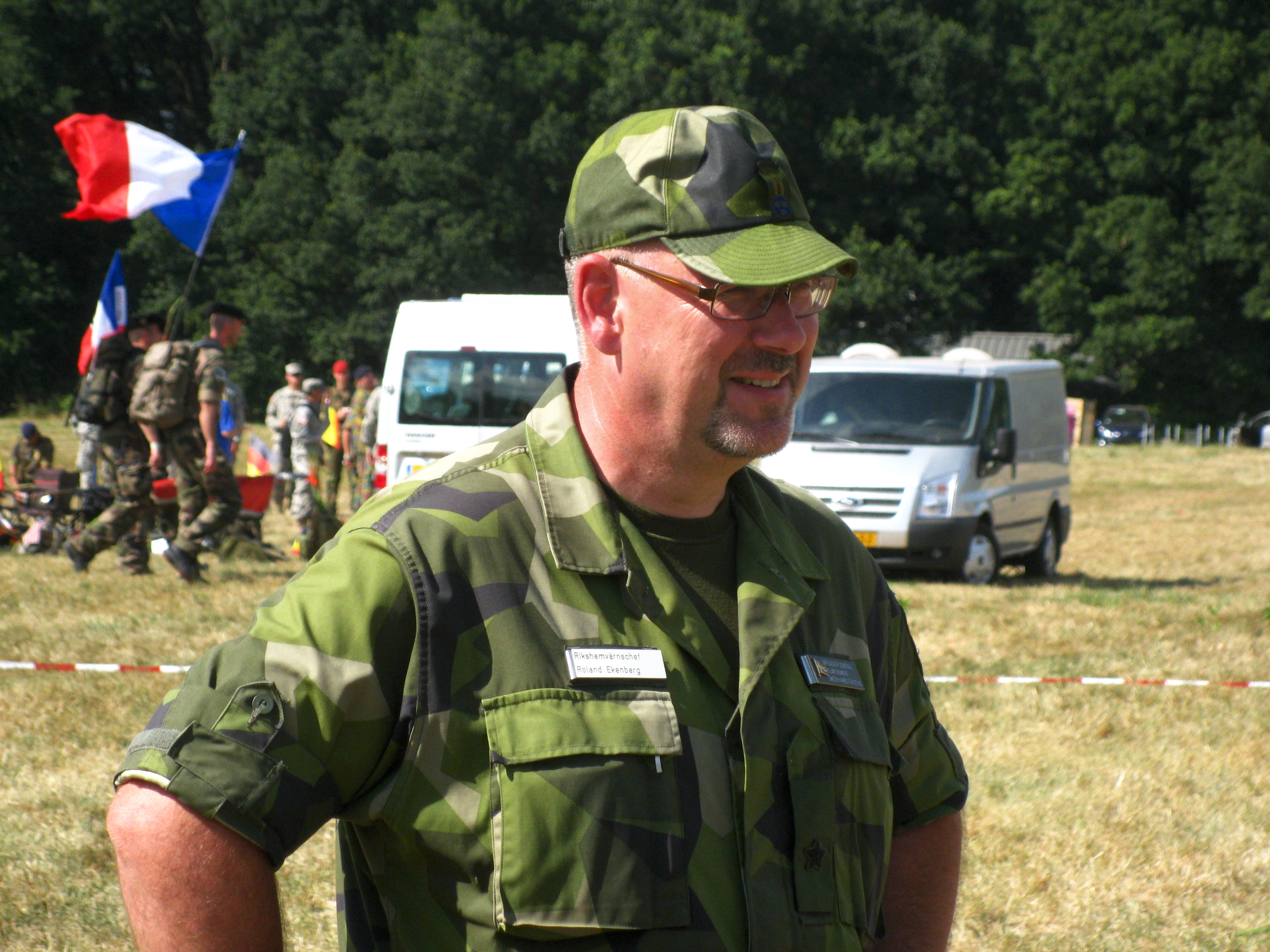
- Ekenberg in 2013.
- Born: Bo Göran Roland Arvidsson; 21 March 1957 (age 69); Jönköping, Sweden
- Military career
- Allegiance: Sweden
- Branch: Swedish Army
- Service years: 1979–2018
- Rank: Major General
- Units: A 6 (1979–85); UNFICYP (1984–85); A 9 (1985–87)
- Commands: Swedish Army Artillery School; Eastern Army Division; Chief of Home Guard
- Conflicts: Cyprus dispute

Major General Bo Göran Roland Ekenberg né Arvidsson (born 21 March 1957) is retired a Swedish Army officer. His senior commands include commanding officer of the Eastern Army Division (1999–2000) and the Chief of Home Guard (2005–2018).

== Career ==
Ekenberg graduated from the Military Academy Karlberg in 1979 and was commissioned the same year as a lieutenant in the Småland Artillery Regiment. He was promoted to captain in 1982 and to major in 1987. Ekenberg served as platoon leader and company commander from 1979 to 1987, first in Småland Artillery Regiment and then, after the regiment was disbanded in 1985, in the Bergslagen Artillery Regiment. He was deployed to Cyprus from 1984 to 1985, serving in the Swedish battalion of the United Nations Peacekeeping Force in Cyprus (UNFICYP). Ekenberg passed the staff course from 1987 to 1989 and then served in the Army Staff from 1989 to 1994. He was promoted to lieutenant colonel in 1994 and served at the Swedish Armed Forces Headquarters in 1994 and in the Middle Army Division from 1995 to 1996.

Ekenberg was commanding officer of the Swedish Army Artillery School (Artilleriets stridsskola) from 1996 to 1999 and was promoted to colonel in 1997. In 1999, he was promoted to senior colonel, after which he was appointed commanding officer of the Eastern Army Division. Ekenberg was then head of the Land Warfare Department (Markstridsavdelningen) in the Joint Forces Directorate (Krigsförbandsledningen) at the Swedish Armed Forces Headquarters from 2000 to 2001. He was promoted to brigadier general in 2002 and was appointed head of the Management Office (Ledningskansliet) at the Swedish Defence University in 2002.

On 1 July 2005, Ekenberg was appointed Chief of Home Guard. He was promoted to major general on 31 May 2017. Ekenberg retired on 31 August 2018 and was succeeded as Chief of Home Guard by Major General Stefan Sandborg. Ekenberg has also served as a Home Guard instructor and an active member of the Artilleribefälsföreningen ("Artillery Officer's Association") in Jönköping. Ekenberg has also been chairman for some time of the Swedish Women's Auxiliary Veterinary Corps (Svenska Blå Stjärnan) for Jönköping County.

== Personal life ==
Ekenberg is married to Christina Ekenberg and they have two children. He has been living in Linköping since 1994.

== Dates of rank ==
- 1979 – Lieutenant
- 1982 – Captain
- 1987 – Major
- 1994 – Lieutenant colonel
- 1997 – Colonel
- 1999 – Senior colonel
- 2002 – Brigadier general
- 2017 – Major general

== Awards and decorations ==
=== Swedish ===
- (Sweden) For Zealous and Devoted Service of the Realm
- (Sweden) Royal Swedish Academy of War Sciences's Medal of Reward in gold, 8th size (12 November 2013)
- (Sweden) Swedish Armed Forces Conscript Medal
- (Sweden) Home Guard Medal of Merit
- (Sweden) Home Guard Bronze Medal
- (Sweden) Association of Home Guard Officers Royal Medal in gold
- (Sweden) Swedish Women's Voluntary Defence Organization Medal of Merit in gold
- (Sweden) H. M. The King's Medal, (silver-gilt) medal worn around the neck on a blue ribbon (13 February 2019)
- (Sweden) Home Guard Petri Medal in gold (HvPetriGM)
- (Sweden) Swedish Air Force Volunteers Association Merit Badge
- (Sweden) Swedish Reserve Officers Federation Merit Badge in silver (Förbundet Sveriges Reservofficerares förtjänsttecken i silver)
- (Sweden) Eastern Army Division Commemorative Medal (Östra arméfördelningens minnesmedalj, ÖFördSMM)
- (Sweden) Psychologic Defence Associations of the Total Defence Medal of Merit (Totalförsvarets psykförsvarsförbunds förtjänstmedalj, TfpsykfbGM/SM) (Criscom)
- (Sweden) Swedish Working Dog Club Medal of Merit (Svenska Brukshundklubbens förtjänstmedalj) (2018)
- (Sweden) Commemorative Medal of the Nobel Prize to the UN Peacekeeping Forces (Medaljen till minne av Nobels fredspris till FNs fredsbevarande styrkor, NobelFNSMM)
- (Sweden) Ekenberg Medal in gold (2 April 2017)
- (Sweden) Swedish Voluntary Engineers Medal of Merit (Insatsingenjörernas Riksförbunds förtjänstmedalj) (23 March 2017)
- (Sweden) Swedish Women's Voluntary Defence Organization Royal Medal of Merit in gold (November 2018)
- (Sweden) Swedish Voluntary Radio Organization Medal of Merit in gold (Frivilliga Radioorganisationens förtjänstmedalj i guld) (2012)
- (Sweden) Frivilliga Skytterörelsen's Bernadotte Medal (Frivilliga skytterörelsens Bernadotte-medalj, FSRBernGM) (26 November 2018)
- (Sweden) Swedish CBRN Association's gold medal no 5 (Svenska CBRN-förbundets guldmedalj nr. 5) (26 November 2018)
- (Sweden) Swedish Working Dog Club, Skåne District Medal of Merit (SBK Skånes förtjänstmedalj) (31 August 2018)

=== Foreign ===
- (Denmark) Home Guard Badge of Merit (Hjemmevaernets fortjensttegn)
- United Nations Medal (UNFICYP; award numeral 2)
- etc

Military offices
Preceded by Ulf Henricsson	Eastern Army Division; 1999–2000	Succeeded by None
Preceded by Anders Lindström	Chief of Home Guard; 2005–2018	Succeeded by Stefan Sandborg
