= Stefan Sandborg =

Senior Swedish Army officer

- Born: Carl Nils Stefan Johansson; 25 March 1970 (age 56); Linköping, Sweden
- Military career
- Allegiance: Sweden
- Branch: Swedish Army
- Service years: 1993–present
- Rank: Major General
- Commands: Dep. CO, Life Guards; 2nd Brigade; Dep. CO, Skaraborg Regiment; Home Guard Department; Chief of Home Guard; Deputy Chief of Joint Operations
- Conflicts: War in Afghanistan

Carl Nils Stefan Sandborg né Johansson (born 25 March 1970) is a senior Swedish Army officer whose career has included key leadership roles within the Life Guards and at the Swedish Armed Forces Headquarters. After graduating from the Military Academy Karlberg in 1993, he rose through the ranks to major general and served as Chief of Home Guard from 2018 to 2022. He later held senior positions within the Defence Staff and, in November 2025, assumed the role of Deputy Chief of Joint Operations.

== Early life ==
Sandborg was born on 25 March 1970 in Linköping Saint Lawrence Parish in Linköping, Sweden.

== Career ==
Sandborg graduated from the Military Academy Karlberg in 1993 and was commissioned as an officer and appointed second lieutenant and was assigned to the Life Grenadier Brigade (Livgrenadjärbrigaden) in Linköping. He served there until the brigade was disbanded on 31 December 1997. From 1998 he served in the Life Guards Brigade (Livgardesbrigaden), where he was promoted to captain the same year. In the mid-2000s, he served as a major and commander of the Life company in the Life Guards in Kungsängen. In 2009, Sandborg graduated with a master's degree from Forsvarets stabsskole in Oslo, Norway where he enrolled as a foreign exchange student two years prior.

Later in his career, he was deputy commander of the Life Guards and has also held various positions at the Swedish Armed Forces Headquarters in Stockholm. On 16 November 2015, Sandborg took over as commander of the 2nd Brigade (Andra brigaden) and also as deputy commander of the Skaraborg Regiment in Skövde (with appointment no later than 30 September 2019). From 1 January 2018, Sandborg was head of the Home Guard Department (Rikshemvärnsavdelningen) at the Swedish Armed Forces Headquarters (with appointment no later than 31 July 2018). In the summer of 2018, Sandborg was promoted to major general and appointed Chief of Home Guard and on 1 September 2018, he succeeded Major General Roland Ekenberg to the post. He in turn was succeeded by Major General Laura Swaan Wrede on 1 October 2022. Sandborg was made available to the Chief of Armed Forces Training & Procurement, Lieutenant General Johan Svensson from 1 October until 31 December 2022. Sandborg was appointed as head of the Support Unit at the Defence Staff effective 1 January 2023. On 1 November 2025, Sandborg took office as the Deputy Chief of Joint Operations.

Sandborg has been a member of the Swedish Armed Forces Board of Tradition (Försvarets traditionsnämnd), a unit within the National Swedish Museums of Military History (Statens försvarshistoriska museer), which handles issues of tradition within the Swedish Armed Forces.

== Personal life ==
Sandborg is married to Caroline Sandborg. Together they have two children.

== Dates of rank ==
- 1993 – Second lieutenant
- ???? – Lieutenant
- 1998 – Captain
- ???? – Major
- ???? – Lieutenant colonel
- ???? – Colonel
- 1 September 2018 – Major general

== Awards and decorations ==
=== Swedish ===
- (Sweden) Swedish Armed Forces Conscript Medal
- (Sweden) Swedish Armed Forces International Service Medal
- (Sweden) National Swedish Museums of Military History Medal of Merit
- (Sweden) Home Guard Petri Medal in silver (HvPetriSM) with laurel wreath (2019)
- (Sweden) Life Guards Medal of Merit
- (Sweden) Life Grenadier Regiment (I 4) Commemorative Medal in silver (LivgregSMM)

=== Foreign ===
- (Denmark) Home Guard Badge of Merit (Hjemmevaernets fortjensttegn) (6 November 2020)
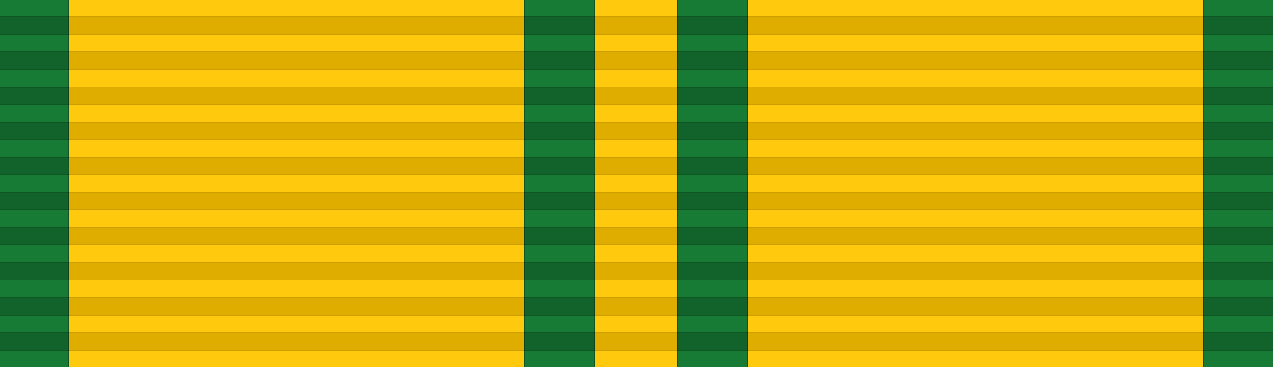
- (Netherlands) Cross for the Four Day Marches
- NATO Non-Article 5 medal for ISAF

Military offices
Preceded by Roland Ekenberg	Chief of Home Guard; 2018–2022	Succeeded by Laura Swaan Wrede
Preceded by Johan Axelsson	Deputy Chief of Joint Operations; 2025–present	Succeeded by Incumbent
