= Chief of Home Guard =

Military appointment of Sweden

- Rikshemvärnschefen
- Coat of arms.

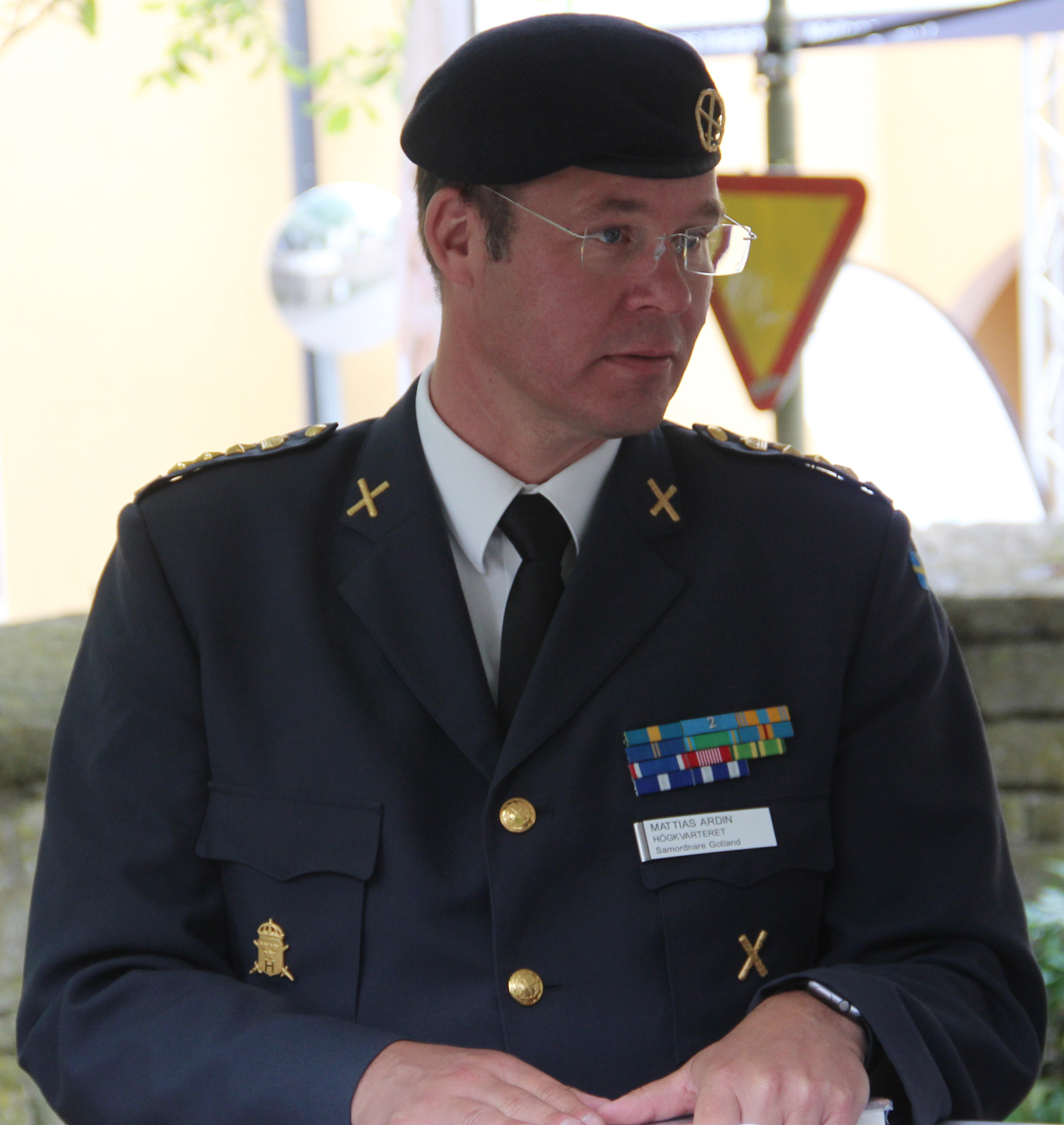
- Incumbent; Major General Mattias Ardin since 9 January 2026
- Swedish Armed Forces
- Reports to: Chief of Armed Forces Training & Procurement
- Seat: Lidingövägen 24, Stockholm, Sweden
- Nominator: Minister for Defence
- Appointer: The Government
- Formation: 1 July 1940
- First holder: Gustaf Petri

The Chief of Home Guard, also called the Chief of the National Swedish Home Guard (Swedish: Rikshemvärnschefen, RiksHvC) is the Swedish Home Guard chief representative. The chief reports to the Chief of Armed Forces Training & Procurement. The Home Guard function and its development are the responsibility of the Chief of Home Guard. As support in their work at the Swedish Armed Forces Headquarters the Chief of Home Guard has the staff of the Home Guard Department (Rikshemvärnsavdelningen). The Chief of Home Guard with staff (the Home Guard Department, PROD RIKSHV) is part of the Training & Procurement Staff.

== Tasks ==
The Chief of Home Guard leads the implementation of the National Home Guard Combat School and the training units' mission activities relating to the Home Guard's operations and inspects the Home Guard units. The Chief of Home Guard is also the chairman of the Home Guard Council (Rikshemvärnsrådet), the central co-influence body of the Home Guard; a council that is chosen at the National Home Guard Council (Rikshemvärnstinget) every other year.

Since 30 January 2020, the following units are subordinated to the Chief of Home Guard: National Home Guard Combat School, Northern Military Region, Central Military Region, Western Military Region, Southern Military Region.

== Coat of arms ==
The coat of arms of the National Home Guard Staff (Rikshemvärnsstaben, Rikshvst) 1994–1948, National Home Guard Center (Rikshemvärnscentrum, RiksHvC) 1994–2000, and the Chief of Home Guard with the Home Guard Department within the Swedish Armed Forces Headquarters (Rikshemvärnschefen med rikshemvärnsavdelningen inom HKV) 2000–present. Blazon: "Azure, the badge of the Home Guard, three crowns, placed two and one, above the letter H, all or. The shield surmounted two swords in saltire or".

== Chiefs ==
=== Chiefs of Home Guard ===
No.	Portrait	Name	Took office	Left office	Time in office	Ref.
Chief of Home Guard (Hemvärnschef)
1	Gustaf Petri	Major general (Note: Petri was colonel when taking office on 1 July 1940 and was promoted to major general on 1 January 1946 while still in office.); Gustaf Petri (1885–1964)	1 July 1940	31 March 1947	6 years, 273 days	
2	Sven Erik Allstrin	Colonel; Sven Erik Allstrin (1891–1963)	1 April 1947	30 June 1948	1 year, 90 days	
Chief of the National Swedish Home Guard (Rikshemvärnschef)
2	Sven Erik Allstrin	Major general (Note: Allstrin was colonel when taking office on 1 April 1947 and was promoted to major general in 1949 while still in office.); Sven Erik Allstrin (1891–1963)	1 July 1948	31 March 1952	3 years, 274 days	
3	Gunnar Brinck	Major general (Note: Brinck was colonel when taking office on 1 April 1952 and was promoted to major general in 1954 while still in office.); Gunnar Brinck (1895–1972)	1 April 1952	30 September 1955	3 years, 182 days	
4	Per Kellin	Major general (Note: Kellin was colonel when taking office on 1 October 1955 and was promoted to major general on 1 October 1959 while still in office.); Per Kellin (1903–1973)	1 October 1955	30 September 1968	12 years, 365 days	
5	Karl Gustaf Brandberg	Major general Karl Gustaf Brandberg (1905–1997)	1 October 1968	30 September 1971	2 years, 364 days	
6	Fredrik Löwenhielm	Major general Fredrik Löwenhielm (1916–2008)	1 October 1971	31 December 1980	9 years, 91 days	
7	Karl Eric Holm	Lieutenant general Karl Eric Holm (1919–2016)	1 January 1981	30 September 1983	2 years, 272 days	
8	Robert Lugn	Major general Robert Lugn (1923–2016)	1 October 1983	1 March 1988	4 years, 152 days	
9	Lars-Eric Wahlgren	Lieutenant general Lars-Eric Wahlgren (1929–1999)	1 April 1988	30 September 1988	182 days	
–	Reinhold Lahti	Major general Reinhold Lahti (1930–2002); Acting	1 July 1988	September 1991	2–3 years	
10	Reinhold Lahti	Major general Reinhold Lahti (1930–2002)	September 1991	31 March 1994	2–3 years	
11	Jan-Olof Borgén	Major general Jan-Olof Borgén (born 1937)	1 April 1994	30 September 1997	3 years, 182 days	
12	Alf Sandqvist	Major general Alf Sandqvist (born 1945)	1 October 1997	30 June 2000	2 years, 273 days	
13	Mats Welff	Major general Mats Welff (born 1947)	1 July 2000	30 September 2002	2 years, 91 days	
14	Anders Lindström	Major general Anders Lindström (born 1955)	1 October 2002	30 June 2005	2 years, 272 days	
15	Roland Ekenberg	Major general (Note: Ekenberg was brigadier general when taking office on 1 July 2005 and was promoted to major general on 31 May 2017 while still in office.); Roland Ekenberg (born 1957)	1 July 2005	30 August 2018	13 years, 61 days	
16	Stefan Sandborg	Major general Stefan Sandborg (born 1970)	1 September 2018	30 September 2022	4 years, 29 days	
17	Laura Swaan Wrede	Major general Laura Swaan Wrede (born 1964)	1 October 2022	9 January 2026	3 years, 100 days	
18	Mattias Ardin	Major general Mattias Ardin (born 1969)	9 January 2026	Incumbent	241 days	

=== Deputy Chiefs of Home Guard ===
Portrait	Name	Took office	Left office	Time in office	Ref.
Åke von Schéele	Colonel; Åke von Schéele (1925–2020)	1980	1986	5–6 years	
Roger Nilsson	Colonel; Roger Nilsson (born ?)	August 2018		7–8 years	
Mattias Ardin	Brigadier general Mattias Ardin (born 1969)	1 March 2023	9 January 2026	2 years, 314 days	
