= Lars-Eric Wahlgren =

Lieutenant General of Swedish Army, Force Commander of the UNIFIL

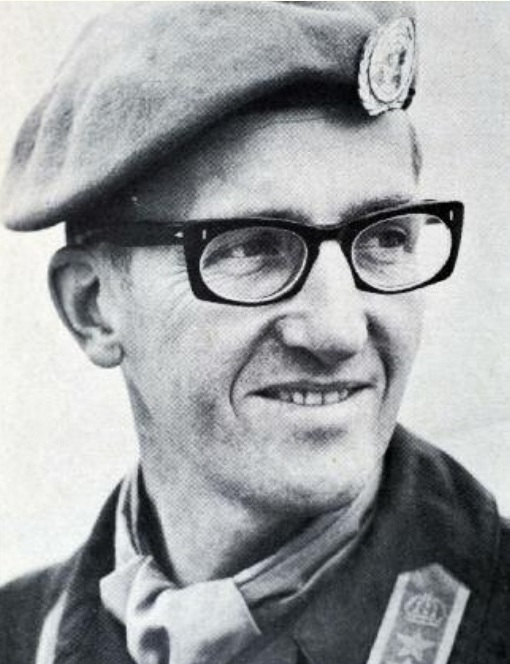
- Wahlgren as battalion commander during UNEF II (1974-75).
- Born: Lars-Eric Malcom Wahlgren; 14 May 1929; Åsele, Sweden
- Died: 10 October 1999 (aged 70); Halmstad, Sweden
- Military career
- Allegiance: Sweden
- Branch: Swedish Army
- Service years: 1953–1993
- Rank: Lieutenant General
- Nickname: Lappen
- Commands: 56M Battalion, UNEF II; Gotland Regiment; Gotland Military Command; Chief of Home Guard; UNIFIL; UNPROFOR
- Conflicts: Arab–Israeli conflict (1974–75); Israeli–Lebanese conflict (1988–93); Yugoslav Wars (1993)
- Awards: Illis quorum

Lieutenant General Lars-Eric Malcom Wahlgren (14 May 1929 – 10 October 1999) was a Swedish Army officer. Wahlgren served as commanding officer of Gotland Military Command, as Chief of Home Guard and as Force Commander of the United Nations Interim Force in Lebanon (UNIFIL) and the United Nations Protection Force (UNPROFOR)

== Early life ==
Wahlgren was born on 14 May 1929 in Åsele, Västerbotten, Sweden, the son of Eric Wahlgren, a forester, and his wife Ruth (née Ellung). He moved to Halmstad where he passed studentexamen at Halmstads högre allmänna läroverk in 1950. He graduated from the Military Academy Karlberg in 1953.

== Career ==
In 1953, Wahlgren was commissioned as an officer in the Swedish Armoured Troops and assigned to the Scanian Armoured Regiment (P 2) in Hässleholm with the rank of second lieutenant. In 1961, he was allowed to serve in the British Army of the Rhine in West Germany as a scholarship holder. Wahlgren completed the staff course at the Swedish Armed Forces Staff College from 1963 to 1965 and was appointed captain of the General Staff Corps. Over the next few years, he alternated between various staff and squad postings. During the years 1967–1968 he was educated at the United States Army Command and General Staff College in Fort Leavenworth. From 1970 to 1975 he served in the Southern Military District Staff and studied at the Swedish National Defence College. Wahlgren received his first position in the United Nations in 1974–1975 as battalion commander of the Swedish Battalion 56M in the Middle East, which was part of the Second United Nations Emergency Force (UNEF II). He was head of course for UN education from 1976 to 1979 and served in North Scanian Regiment (P 6) from 1975 to 1977. Wahlgren was promoted to colonel in 1977 and served in the years 1977–1980 as a defence attaché in Oslo and during that same year also as head of the UN Staff Officers Course in Strängnäs. In 1980, Wahlgren began an era as commanding officer of Gotland Regiment (P 18) and this for a longer period. In 1983 he was promoted to major general and commander of Gotland Military Command. Wahlgren established himself well in the Gotlandian environment and became an esteemed interpreter for Gotlandian defence and voluntary movement. He had at the same time gained a good international experience.

In 1988, however, it was time to leave Gotland. Wahlgren served as Chief of Home Guard from 1 April 1988. The posting was short-lived as he was promoted to lieutenant general, and appointed Force Commander of the United Nations Interim Force in Lebanon (UNIFIL). Wahlgren succeeded Lieutenant General Gustav Hägglund on 1 July 1988 and was promoted to lieutenant general on the same date. He was succeeded as Chief of Home Guard on 1 July 1988 by Major General Reinhold Lahti. However, Wahlgren remained as Chief of Home Guard and Lahti as Acting Chief of Home Guard until Wahlgren left the position and Lahti became regular chief in September 1991. Wahlgren led UNIFIL at the time when the Lebanese Civil War finally ended after fifteen long years with a peace agreement signed in the Saudi Arabian city of Ta'if in August 1990. In September 1991 was appointed new military commander in the Lower Norrland Military District in Östersund. He would have taken office in April 1992, as he continued to serve as Force Commander for UNIFIL for a while in 1992. Wahlgren never took up this post as his appointment as Force Commander was extended to February 1993.

On 22 February 1993 he left his unit in Naqoura, Lebanon, after five years and eight months as commander. On 1 March 1993, he traveled to Zagreb to succeed General Satish Nambiar as Force Commander of the United Nations Protection Force (UNPROFOR) on 3 March 1993. From the headquarters in Zagreb, he came to command one of the largest and most expensive and most complex UN missions ever. The force numbered about 14,000-23,000 men from 21 nations. He made a remarkable effort there in a worrying situation. A difficult job, he faced questions of political significance, which had to do with national considerations in the UN mission. On Wednesday, 23 June 1993, however, Wahlgren's time in Yugoslavia ended after a game at a high political level where he was replaced by the French general Jean Cot. This was due to the fact that France in the United Nations demanded the leadership by virtue of having largest UN troop in the Balkans. The general exchange was handled clumsily and caused some diplomatic complications between Sweden and the UN, which forgot to inform the Swedish government before the officialisation. Wahlgren received an unreserved apology and praise from UN Secretary-General Boutros Boutros-Ghali for this and for his efforts in Yugoslavia.

Wahlgren, who throughout his career carried with him a clear West Bothnian dialect, became one of Sweden's most internationally oriented officers. He reached the high positions and was involved in various assignments even after his retirement. From 1995, he was one of the eight senior officers from various countries who were members of the International Defence Advisory Board, created at the request of the Defence Ministers of the three Baltic states to provide independent expert advice on defence matters. He was also engaged by UNESCO on issues that had to do with the protection of cultural heritage in war situations, an issue that had been extensively raised during the Bosnian War. He presented his visions of the possibilities of the United Nations in his publication FN:s insatser för fred mot år 2000 (1994).

== Personal life ==
Wahlgren got engage to Gunilla Margaretha Granlind (born 1933), the daughter of banker Harald Granlind and Hildur (née Anderfelt) in April 1956. The banns of marriage were issued in February 1957 and the wedding was held on 1 March 1957 in St. Mary's Church in Helsingborg. They had two daughters, Susanne and Monica.

His interests consisted of skiing and hunting and his reading of Per Anders Fogelström.

== Dates of rank ==
- 1953 – Second lieutenant
- 1955 – Lieutenant
- 1964 – Captain
- 1969 – Major
- 1972 – Lieutenant colonel
- 1977 – Colonel
- 1983 – Major general
- 1 July 1988 – Lieutenant general

== Awards and decorations ==
=== Swedish ===
- (Sweden) Illis quorum, 12th size (1993)
- (Sweden) Knight 1st Class of the Order of the Sword (5 June 1971)

=== Foreign ===
- (Norway) Commander of the Order of St. Olav (1 July 1980)
- United Nations Medal (UNEF II) (1975)
- United Nations Medal (UNIFIL) (1993)
- United Nations Medal (UNPROFOR) (1993)

== Honours ==
- Member of the Royal Swedish Academy of War Sciences (1983)

== Bibliography ==
- Wahlgren, Lars-Eric (1994). FNs insatser för fred mot år 2000. TFF konfliktläkning; [8] (in Swedish). Lund: Transnationella stift. för freds- och framtidsforskning (TFF). SELIBR 1925136.

Military offices
Preceded by Bengt Tamfeldt	Gotland Military Command; 1983–1988	Succeeded by Sven-Åke Jansson
Preceded by Robert Lugn	Chief of Home Guard; 1988–1988	Succeeded by Reinhold Lahti
Preceded by Gustav Hägglund	UNIFIL; 1988–1993	Succeeded by Trond Furuhovde
Preceded by Satish Nambiar	UNPROFOR; 1993–1993	Succeeded by Jean Cot
