= Laura Swaan Wrede =

Swedish major general

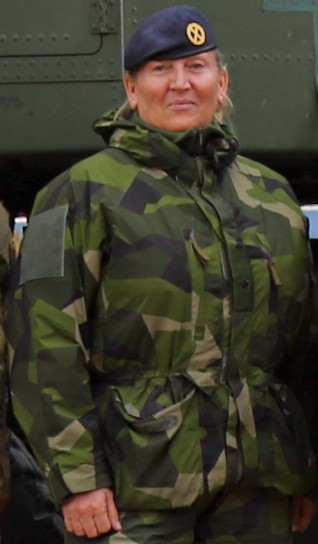
- Swaan Wrede in 2022.
- Born: Laura Maria Swaan; 17 August 1964 (age 62)
- Military career
- Allegiance: Sweden
- Branch: Swedish Army
- Service years: 1987–present
- Rank: Major General
- Commands: Life Guards; Deputy Chief of Army; Chief of Home Guard; MN ST-C, EUMAM Ukraine/UA
- Conflicts: Lebanese Civil War (UNIFIL); Yugoslav Wars (UNPROFOR)

Major General Laura Maria Swaan Wrede, née Swaan (born 16 August 1964) is a Swedish Army officer. She currently serves as the Deputy Commander of the Multinational Special Training Command (MN ST-C) European Union Military Assistance Mission in support of Ukraine (EUMAM Ukraine/UA) since May 2026. She previously served as regimental commander of the Life Guards between 2017 and 2020 (she was the first female commander of the Life Guards), the Deputy Chief of Army from 2020 to 2022, and as the Chief of Home Guard from 2022 to 2026.

== Early life ==
Swaan Wrede was born on 16 August 1964. She moved to Målilla, Kalmar County, Sweden at the age of 6 and attended school in Vimmerby. Her father was self-employed, and her mother worked in finance. Her sister is an officer, and several of her female relatives have a military background. Her grandmother’s sister served at the front during both the Winter War and the Continuation War in Finland. Her grandmother and mother were born in Karelia.

At the age of twelve, Swaan Wrede decided that she wanted to become an officer, though she has stated that she is unsure where the idea originated. When it came time for her school work experience (prao), she was informed by her guidance counselor that "the military does not accept girls." Unwilling to accept this, Wrede contacted the Småland Regiment (I 12) in Eksjö on her own initiative. Lieutenant Colonel Inge Werner, who was considered forward-thinking for his time, took her request seriously and invited her to spend a few nights at the regiment. She was accommodated in the infirmary, and it was during this visit in 1980—when women were not yet permitted to perform compulsory military service—that her interest in a military career was likely established. The experience strengthened her determination, and she subsequently joined the Swedish Women's Voluntary Defence Organization and the Swedish Voluntary Motorcycle Corps (Frivilliga Motorcykelkåren, FMCK). When the Swedish Armed Forces later opened recruitment to women, Swaan Wrede applied to the army and was accepted as one of the first female recruits. She began her service at the age of eighteen and has remained in the military since then.

Wrede completed her military training at the Luleå Anti-Aircraft Regiment (Lv 7) in Luleå, where she specialized in air defense operations and trained to operate a range of weapons systems, including the Bofors 40 mm L/60 gun, the RBS 70, and the MIM-23 Hawk.

== Career ==
Swaan Wrede was commissioned as an officer in the Swedish Army in 1987. She was the first woman in the Swedish Armed Forces to receive a scholarship from the Federation of Swedish Finnish Volunteers (Förbundet svenska finlandsfrivilliga) after completing officer training at the Military Academy Karlberg. In the early 1990s, she served in the Scanian Anti-Aircraft Corps (Lv 4) in Ystad.

Swaan Wrede has been in charge of several units throughout her career, mainly at the Life Guards. She has also served several international operations outside Swedish territory, including as a UN observer in the Middle East (UNTSO). She has also served in Lebanon (UNIFIL) and Bosnia (UNPROFOR), and has been involved in international operations in Mali, Somalia, Afghanistan and more. From 2008 Swaan Wrede served as ADC to Victoria, Crown Princess of Sweden.

On 14 December 2014, Swaan Wrede was promoted to colonel and appointed head of department in the Land Component Command (INSS ATS) at the Swedish Armed Forces Headquarters in Stockholm. On 1 November 2017, she assumed the position of regimental commander of the Life Guards, and thus became the first woman regimental commander in Sweden.

She was appointed Deputy Chief of Army on 1 April 2020 and promoted to brigadier general. The Swedish Armed Forces terminated Swaan Wrede's appointment as ADC to Victoria, Crown Princess of Sweden from 1 January 2021.

On 1 October 2022, Swaan Wrede assumed the position of Chief of Home Guard and was simultaneously promoted to major general. She held this position until 8 January 2026 when she was succeeded by Major General Mattias Ardin. On 12 May 2026, she assumed the position of Deputy Commander of the Multinational Special Training Command (MN ST-C) European Union Military Assistance Mission in support of Ukraine (EUMAM Ukraine/UA).

== Dates of rank ==
- 14 December 2014 – Colonel
- 1 April 2020 – Brigadier general
- 1 October 2022 – Major general

== Awards and decorations ==
=== Swedish ===
- (Sweden) King Carl XVI Gustaf's Jubilee Commemorative Medal II (23 August 2013)
- (Sweden) Crown Princess Victoria and Prince Daniel's Wedding Commemorative Medal (8 June 2010)
- (Sweden) H. M. The King's Medal, 8th size gold (silver-gilt) medal worn on the chest suspended by the Order of the Seraphim ribbon (2014)
- (Sweden) For Zealous and Devoted Service of the Realm
- (Sweden) Swedish Armed Forces Conscript Medal
- (Sweden) Swedish Armed Forces International Service Medal (award numeral 3)
- (Sweden) Home Guard Bronze Medal (2019)
- (Sweden) Life Guard’s Medal of Merit
- (Sweden) Military Academy Karlberg Medal of Merit (Militärhögskolan Karlbergs förtjänstmedalj)

=== Foreign ===
- Commander of the Order of the Lion of Finland
- (Denmark) Home Guard Medal of Merit
- (Norway) Home Guard Medal of Merit
- United Nations Medal (UNIFIL)
- United Nations Medal (UNPROFOR)
- United Nations Medal (UNTSO) (award numeral 2)
- etc

Military offices
Preceded by Christer Tistam	Life Guards; 2017–2020	Succeeded by Stefan Nacksten
Preceded by Fredrik Ståhlberg	Deputy Chief of Army; 2020–2022	Succeeded by Anders Svensson
Preceded by Stefan Sandborg	Chief of Home Guard; 2022–2026	Succeeded by Mattias Ardin
Preceded by Maurice Timmermans	Deputy Commander, Multinational Special Training Command; 2026–present	Succeeded by Incumbent
