= National Home Guard Combat School =

- Hemvärnets stridsskola
- Active: 1943–present
- Country: Sweden
- Allegiance: Swedish Armed Forces
- Branch: Swedish Army
- Type: School
- Role: Training commanders
- Part of: Swedish Armed Forces Headquarters
- Garrison/HQ: Vällinge, Salem Municipality
- March: "På vakt" (S. Rydberg) (Note: The unit march is inherited from Svea Engineer Corps, and was established in 2007.)
- Anniversaries: 29 May

Commanders
- Current commander: COL Mattias Bergqvist von Post

The National Home Guard Combat School (Swedish: Hemvärnets stridsskola, HvSS) is a school of the Swedish Home Guard which trains Home Guard commanders in combat and leadership. Its based in Vällinge in Salem Municipality.

== History ==
The National Home Guard Combat School was inaugurated on 27 June 1943. In the autumn of 1941, the Home Guard began searching for a central place for training and the then Home Guard chief Gustaf Petri visited, among other places, the manor Vällinge. The site was found suitable and received permission from, among others, Stockholms vattenledningsverk ("Stockholm's waterworks") to use the buildings and the surrounding land for a symbolic sum of SEK 200 per year. In March 1942, a call was sent out to companies and certain individuals for grants for the renovation of the school, among other things signed by Crown Prince Gustaf Adolf, and soon SEK 445,000 had been collected. Of this sum, two student rooms and a shooting range were built.

== Heraldry and traditions ==
=== Coats of arms ===
Blazon: "Azure, the badge of the Home guard, the letter H under three open crowns, placed two and one inside an open chaplet of laurel, all or. The shield surmounted two swords in saltire of the last colour."

=== Colours, standards and guidons ===
The colour was presented to the school in Vällinge by His Majesty the King Carl XVI Gustaf at the 50-years school anniversary on 27 May 1993. The colour is drawn by Ingrid Lamby and embroidered by machine in insertion technique by Gunilla Hjort. Blazon: "On blue cloth in the centre the badge of the Home Guard; the letter H under three open crowns placed two and one inside an open chaplet of laurels. In the second and fourth corners the year 1943 divided with two figures in each corner, all yellow."

== Commanding officers ==
- 1943-07-01–1945: Capt Roland Tillman, I 4
- 1949-06-01–1953-03-31: Capt Erik Gunnar Burman, I 19
- 1953-04-01–1957-06-30: Capt Sten Lindqvist, I 15
- 1957-07-01–1963-07-31: Maj Sten-Eggert Nauclér, I 4
- 1963-08-01–1974-09-30: LtCol Orvar Nilsson, I 14
- 1974-10-01–1981-03-31: LtCol Per Richard, I 15
- 1981-04-01–1986-03-31: LtCol Bo Eriksson, I 21
- 1986-04-01–1990-09-30: LtCol Stig Dackevall, I 1
- 1990-10-01–1992-04-01: Col Kjell Forsmark, A 9
- 1992-04-01–1992-05-15: LtCol Caj Gavestam, I 3
- 1992-05-15–1994-03-27: LtCol Sammy Enkullen, I 1
- 1994-03-28–1994-09-30: LtCol Caj Gavestam, I 3
- 1994-10-01–1999-04-30: Col Henrik von Vegesack, I 1
- 1999-05-01–2001-07-01: LtCol Jonny Nilsson, I 14/LG
- 2001-07-01–2004-12-31: LtCol Lars Enlund, Ing 1
- 2005-01-01–2007-02-16 (04-01): LtCol Anders Gustafsson, HKV
- 2007-02-19–2007-03-31: LtCol Bengt Gustavsson, HKV
- 2007-04-01–2010-06-30: LtCol Torsten Hallstedt, HKV
- 2010-07-01–2017-12-31: Col Björn Olsson, HKV
- 2018-01-01–2018-02-28: LtCol Claes Alsteryd, HvSS (acting) (Note: Took over as acting commander on 1 January 2018, with an appointment no later than 31 March 2018.)
- 2018-03-01–2021-07-31: Col Jonas Karlsson (Note: Took over as commander on 1 March 2018, with an appointment no later than 31 March 2022.)
- 2021-08-01–2021-12-31: LtCol Per Magnus Nilsson
- 2022-01-01: LtCol Håkan Sigurdsson (acting)
- 2022-03-31–2026-03-31: Col Johan Brovertz, HvSS (Note: Took over as acting commander on 1 March 2022, with an appointment no later than 31 March 2026.)
- 2025-09-01–2025-11-30: LtCol Mattias Bergqvist von Post (acting) (Note: Took over as acting commander on 1 September 2025, with an appointment no later than 31 August 2027.)
- 2025-12-01–present: Col Mattias Bergqvist von Post (Note: Took over as acting commander on 1 December 2025, with an appointment no later than 31 August 2028.)

== Names, designations and locations ==
Name	Translation	From		To
Hemvärnets stridsskola	National Home Guard Combat School; Combat School of the National [Swedish] Home Guard	1941-07-01	–	
Designation		From		To
HvSS		1941-07-01	–	
Location		From		To
Vällinge		1943-06-27	–	
