= Löjtnant =

Swedish and Finnish military rank

Löjtnant (English: Lieutenant in the Swedish Army/Air Force, Sub-lieutenant in the Navy) is a company grade officer rank. In the army/airforce, it ranks above second lieutenant and below captain. In the navy, it ranks above acting sub-lieutenant and below lieutenant. It is equivalent to the specialist officers rank of förvaltare. The rank has been used in Sweden since the Middle Ages.

== Army/Air Force/Navy ==
Lieutenant Löjtnant
- Country: Sweden
- Service branch: Army; Air Force; Navy (Amphibious Corps (Note: Swedish Coastal Artillery (1902–2000), Swedish Amphibious Corps (2000–present).))
- Abbreviation: Lt (Swedish), Lt (English)
- Rank: Lieutenant
- NATO rank code: OF-1
- Next higher rank: Captain
- Next lower rank: Second lieutenant
- Equivalent ranks: Sub-lieutenant (navy); Fanjunkare

Löjtnant (lieutenant) is a rank in the Swedish Army, Swedish Air Force and in the Swedish Navy (Coastal Artillery 1902–2000, Amphibious Corps 2000–present).

=== History ===
The rank of löjtnant (lieutenant) appears for the first time during the latter part of the Middle Ages. Originally, it designated the (commander's) deputy, of which the compositions were lieutenant general, lieutenant colonel and captain lieutenant, and sometimes also the lowest commander's deputy. Eventually the word changed to refer exclusively to the company commander's deputy, and even later the rank fänrik (or cornet) for the lowest officer rank was replaced by lieutenant, after which the rank of lieutenant in Sweden was divided into two, löjtnant and underlöjtnant. The fänrik rank was reintroduced in 1914 with the same status as underlöjtnant, but it was subsequently moved one level below underlöjtnant in 1926. Underlöjtnant was removed from the Swedish Armed Forces rank structure in 1937.

=== Duties ===
A lieutenant in the army serves in two areas, as commander and as a staff officer in a battalion (or brigade). As a commander, a lieutenant mainly serves as a platoon leader both in the war organization and in basic training of units. A lieutenant can also be developed by serving as a teacher at a school. A lieutenant should be able to work as a “first-line commander”, to be able to lead education, practice and training and to be able to supervise colleagues within one's own area of competence. The army emphasizes that the lieutenant must be competent in supervising younger colleagues and lead platoon combat training.

=== Promotion ===
According to Chapter 2, Section 1 of FFS 2018:7, a person who is eligible for promotion has served in the Swedish Armed Forces to such an extent that assessment of suitability, knowledge and skills could be carried out, is deemed suitable for promotion, possesses the knowledge and skills required for the higher rank, and meets time requirements according to Section 2 (must have held the rank for at least two years). For promotion from second lieutenant to lieutenant may take place if the second lieutenant holds an academic degree at the undergraduate level. A second lieutenant who has completed the Swedish Armed Forces' pilot training with an approved result may be promoted to lieutenant without holding an academic degree at the undergraduate level. Promotion of lieutenant to captain, it is only required that the lieutenant is promotable according to Chapter 2, Section 1. For a lieutenant who has completed the Swedish Armed Forces' pilot training, promotion may only take place if the lieutenant has an academic degree at the undergraduate level.

In the case of reserve officers, promotion of second lieutenant to lieutenant may take place if the second lieutenant holds an academic degree at the undergraduate level, or at least 180 higher education credits (högskolepoäng) if the program comprises more higher education credits than 180. Promotion of lieutenant to captain may take place if the lieutenant holds an academic degree at the undergraduate level, or at least 180 higher education credits if the program comprises more higher education credits than 180.

=== Rank insignia ===
==== Collar patches ====
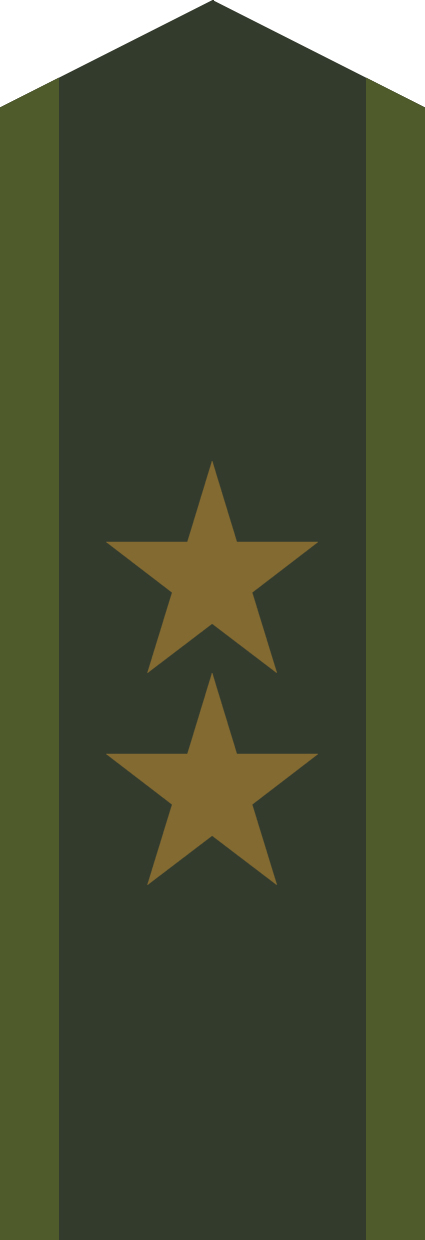
Collar patch m/58 for a lieutenant

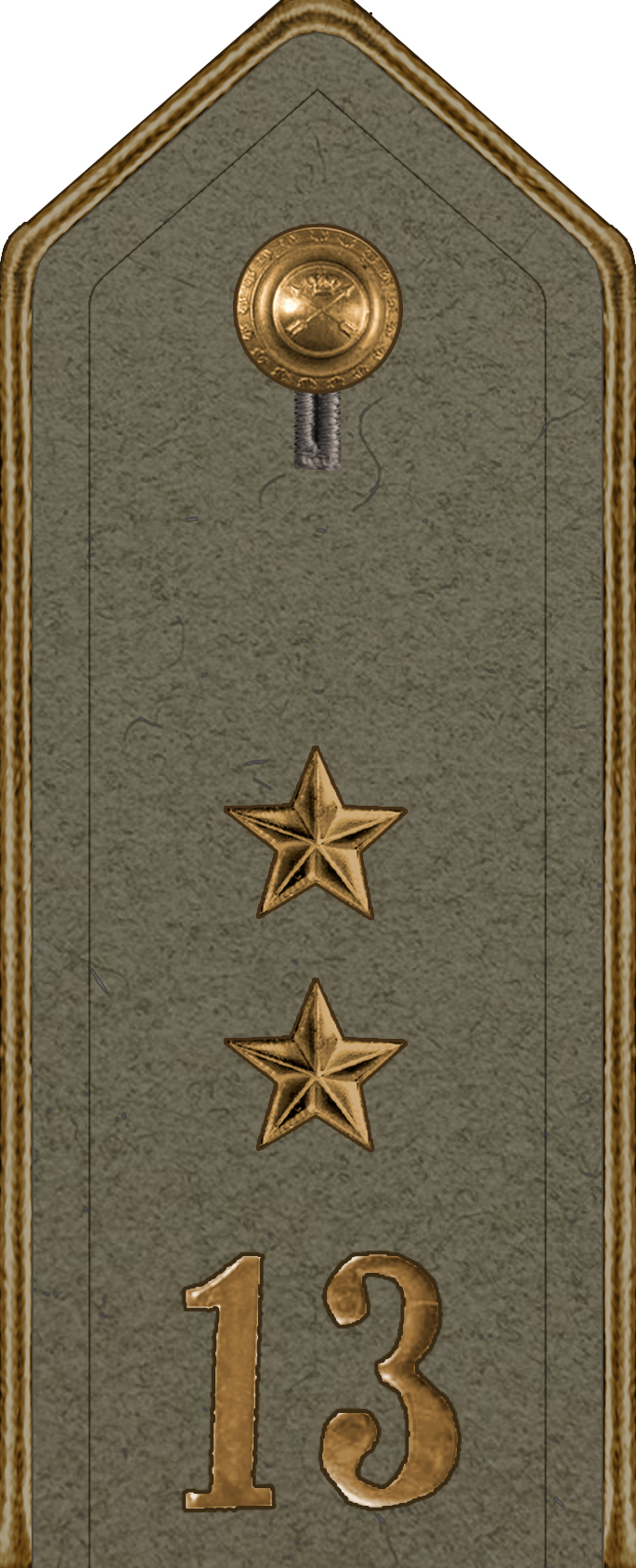
Collar patch
(13 = Dalarna Regiment)

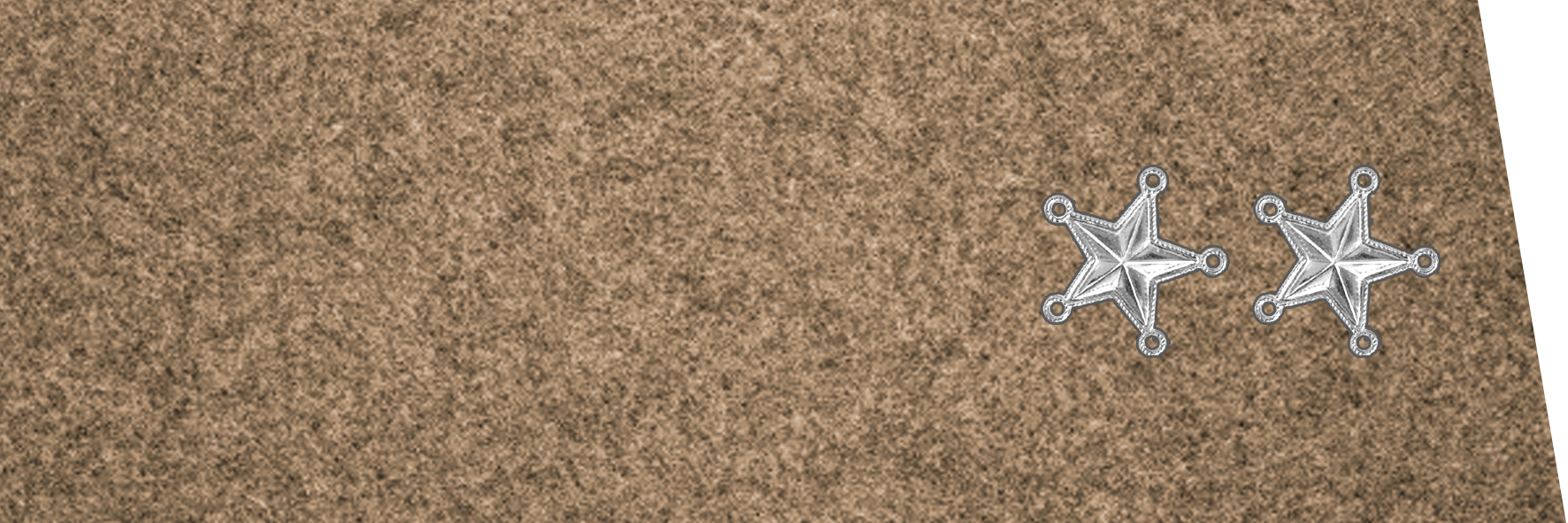
Collar patch

==== Shoulder insignia ====
===== Air Force =====
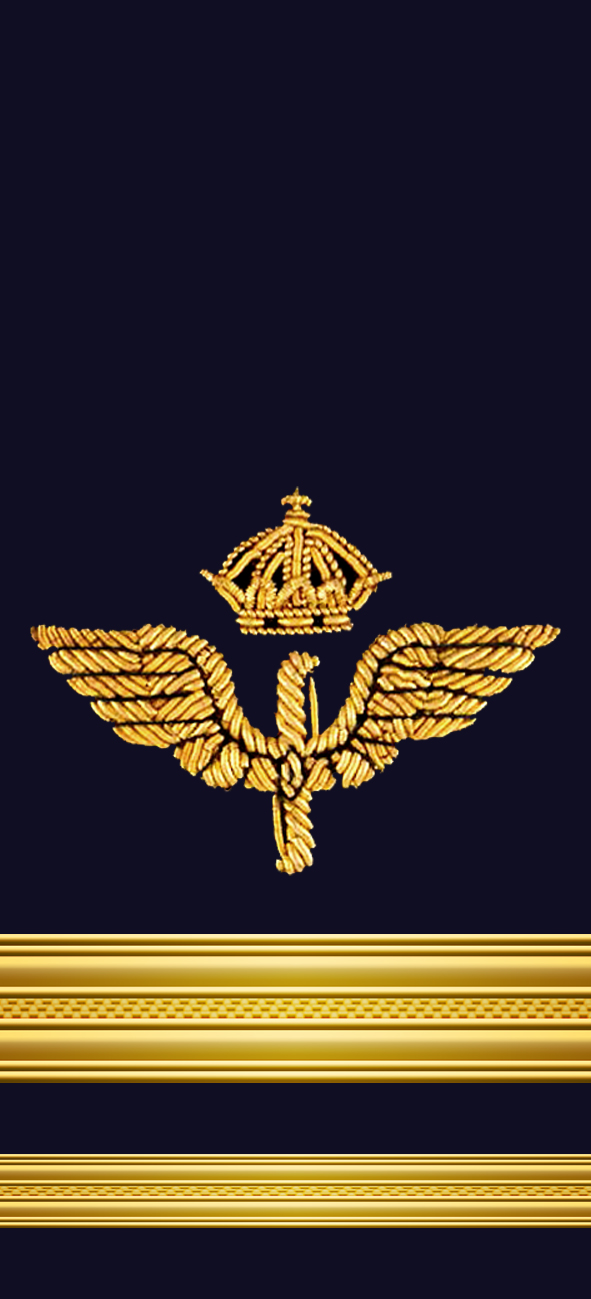
(2003–present)

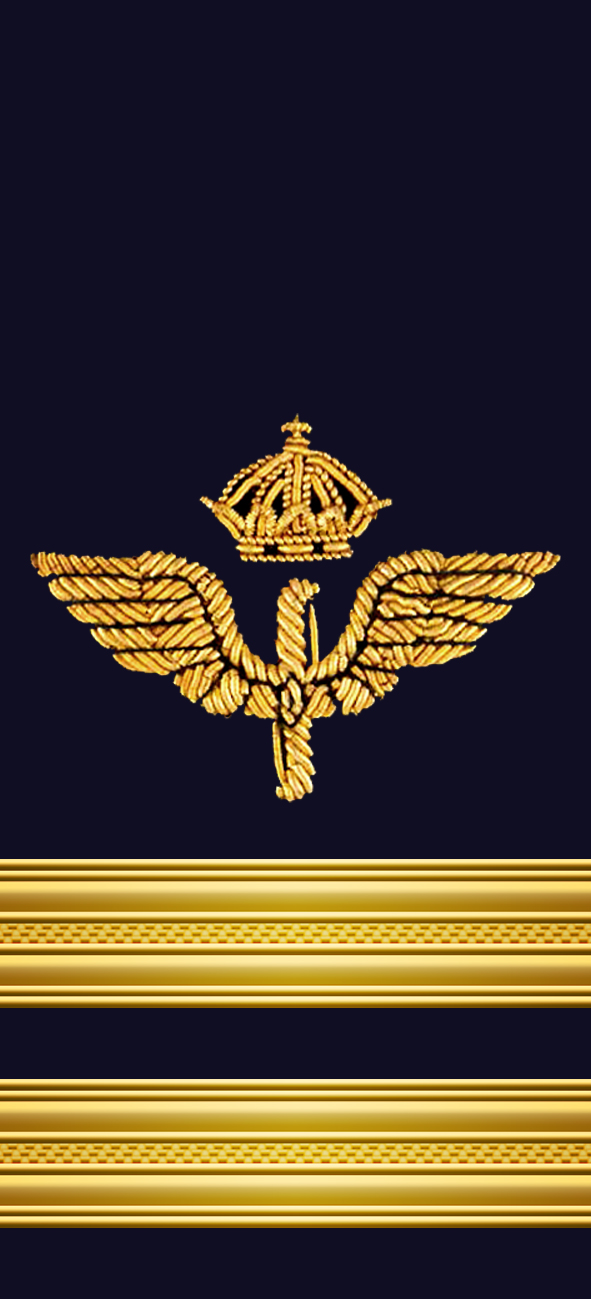
(–2003)

===== Army =====
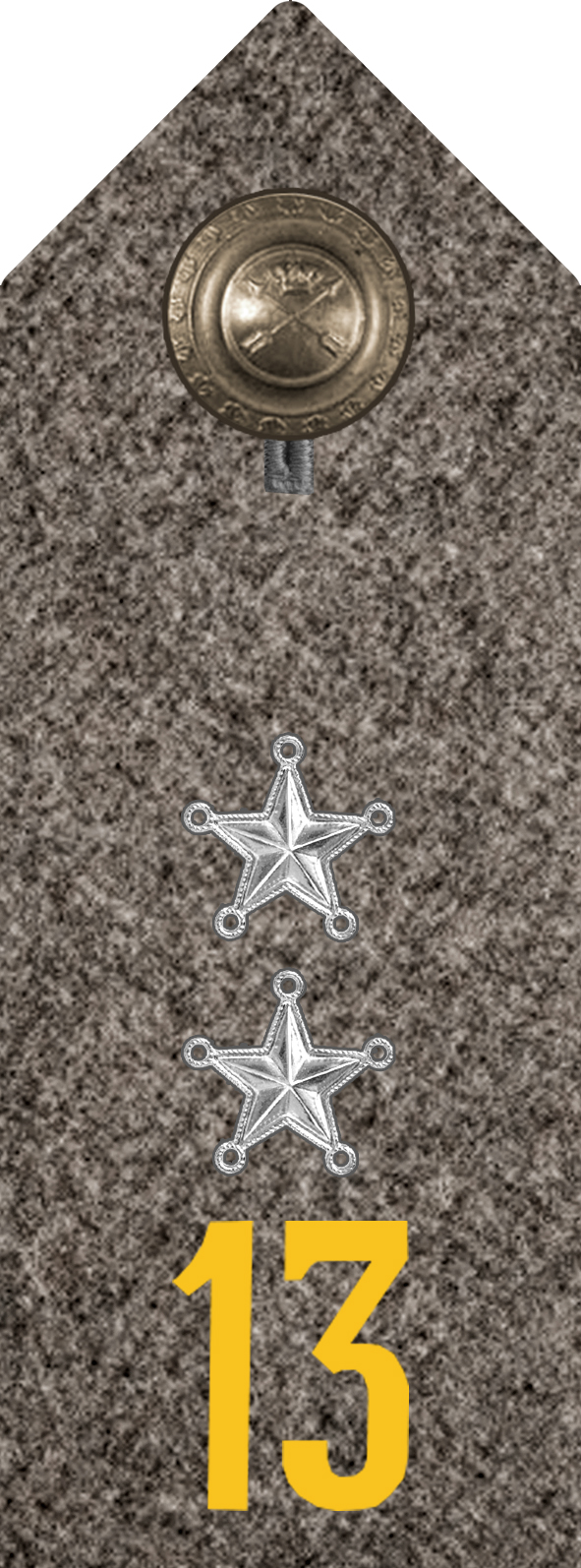
Shoulder strap m/1923
(13 = Dalarna Regiment)

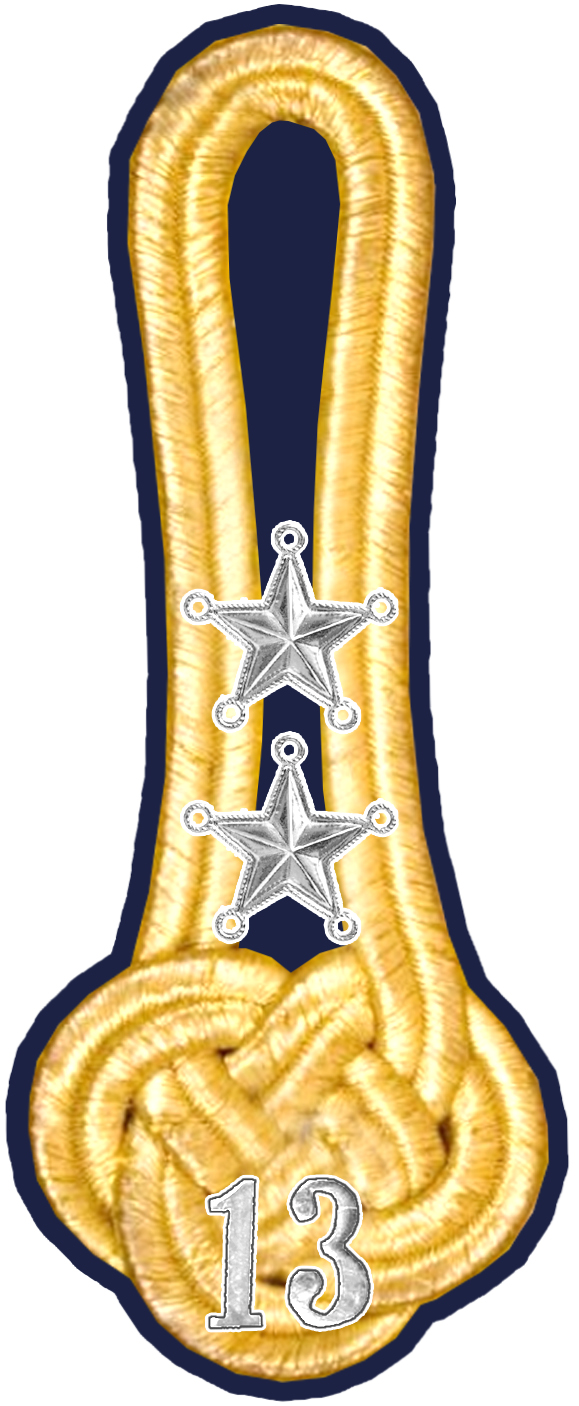
Shoulder cords m/1910
(13 = Dalarna Regiment)

===== Navy (Amphibious Corps) =====
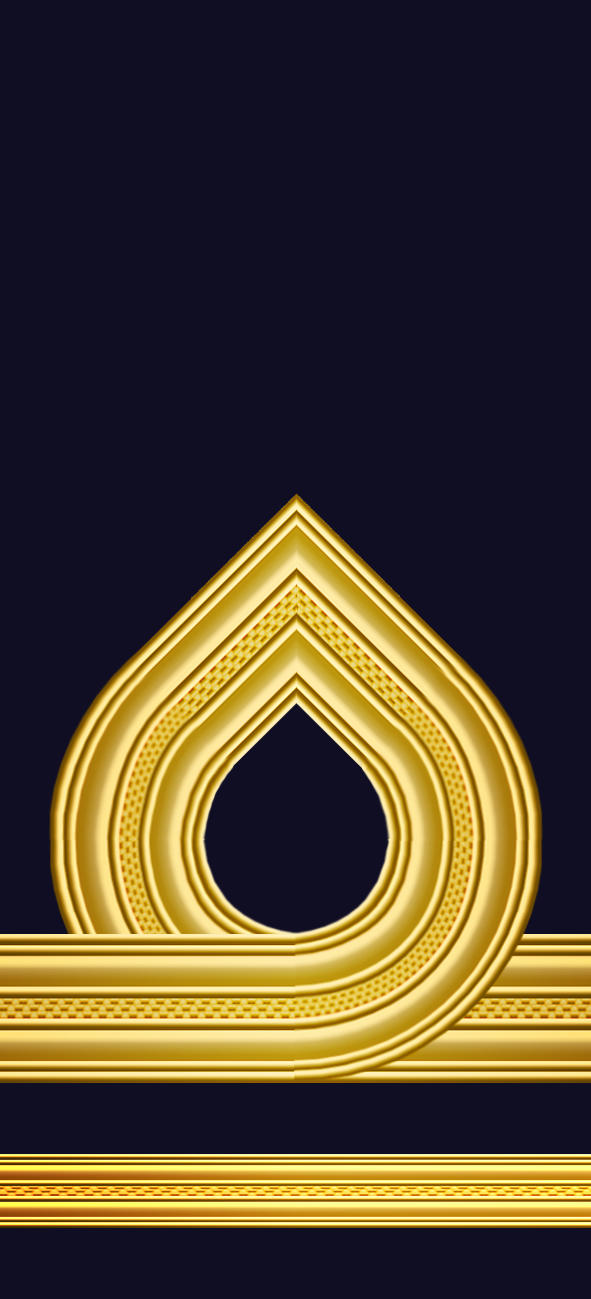
Embroidered shoulder insignia (Navy)
(2003–present)

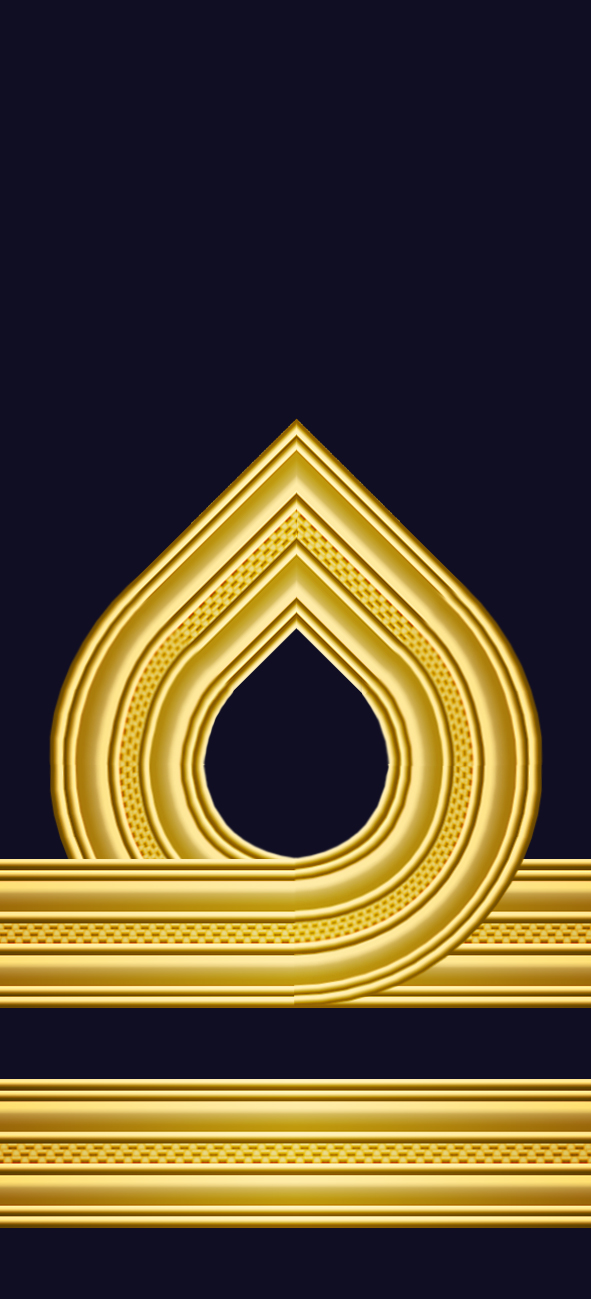
Embroidered shoulder insignia (Navy)
(–2003)

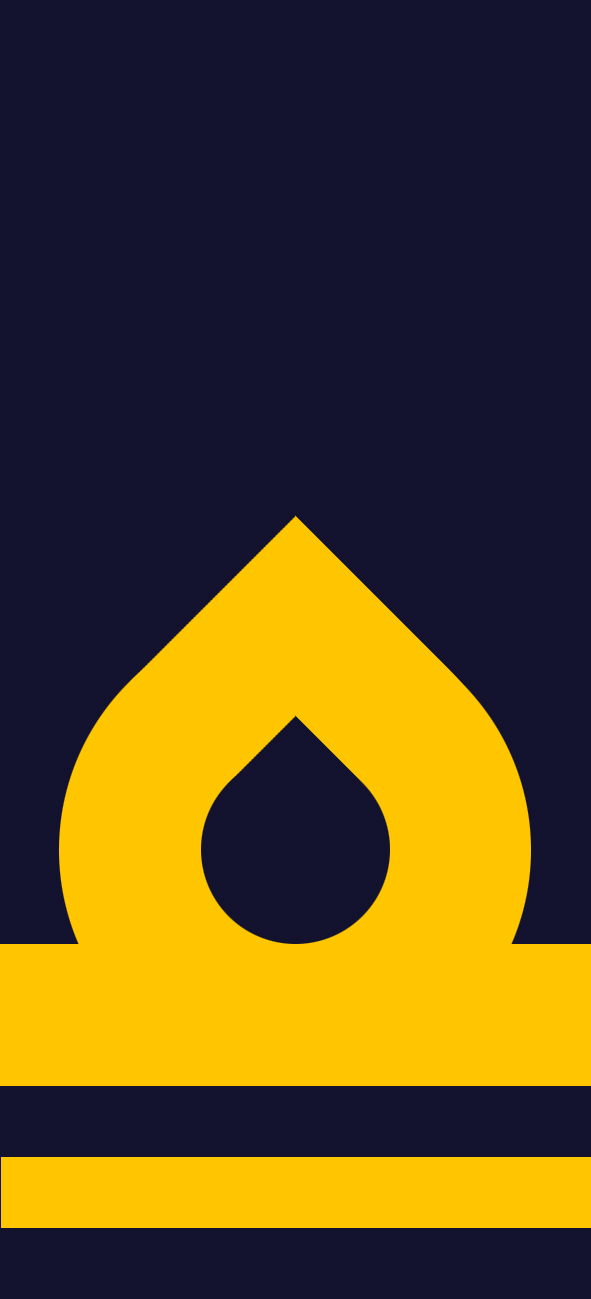
Woven shoulder insignia (2003–present)

==== Air Force ====
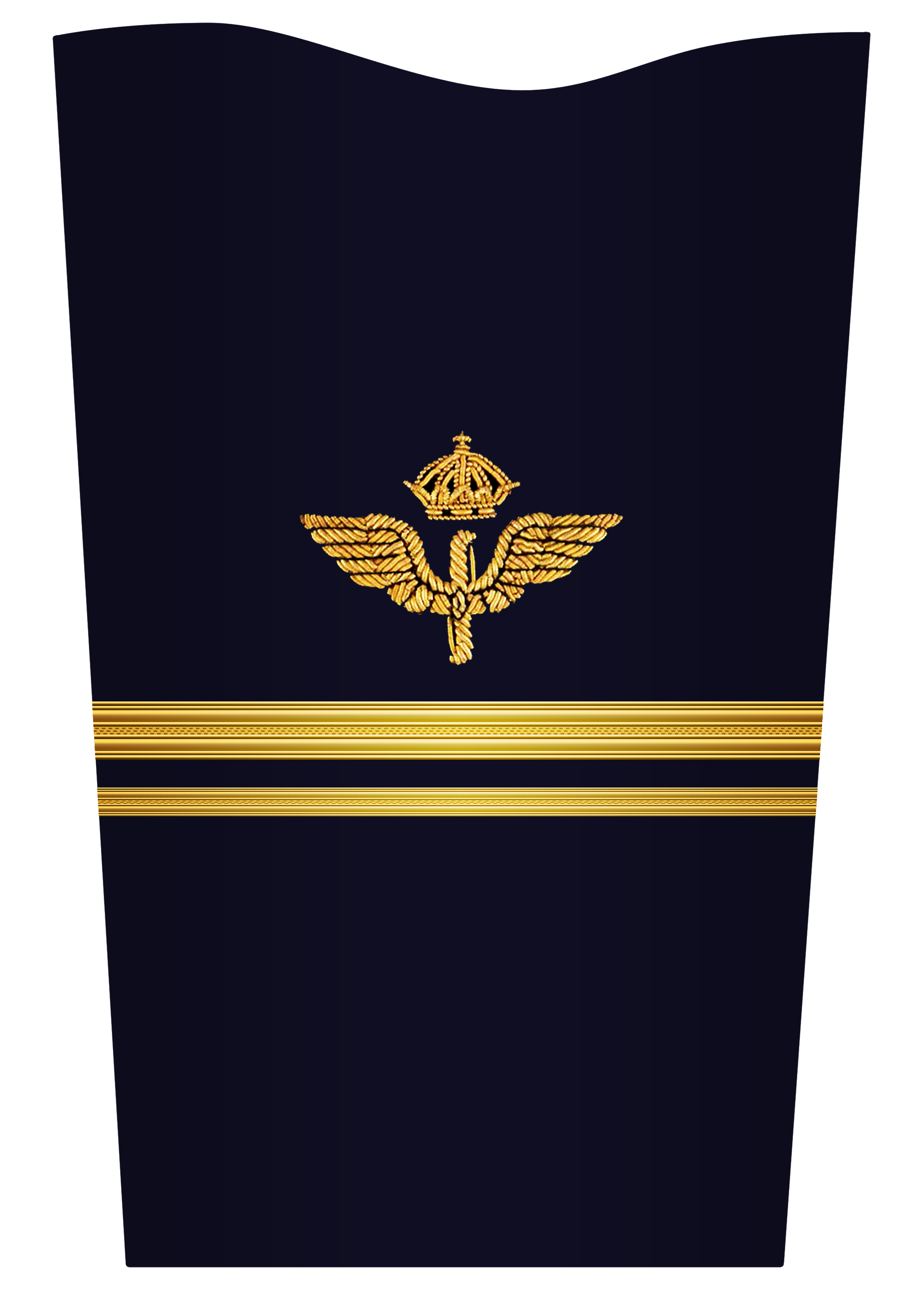
Mess jacket sleeve insignia for a lieutenant
(2003–present)

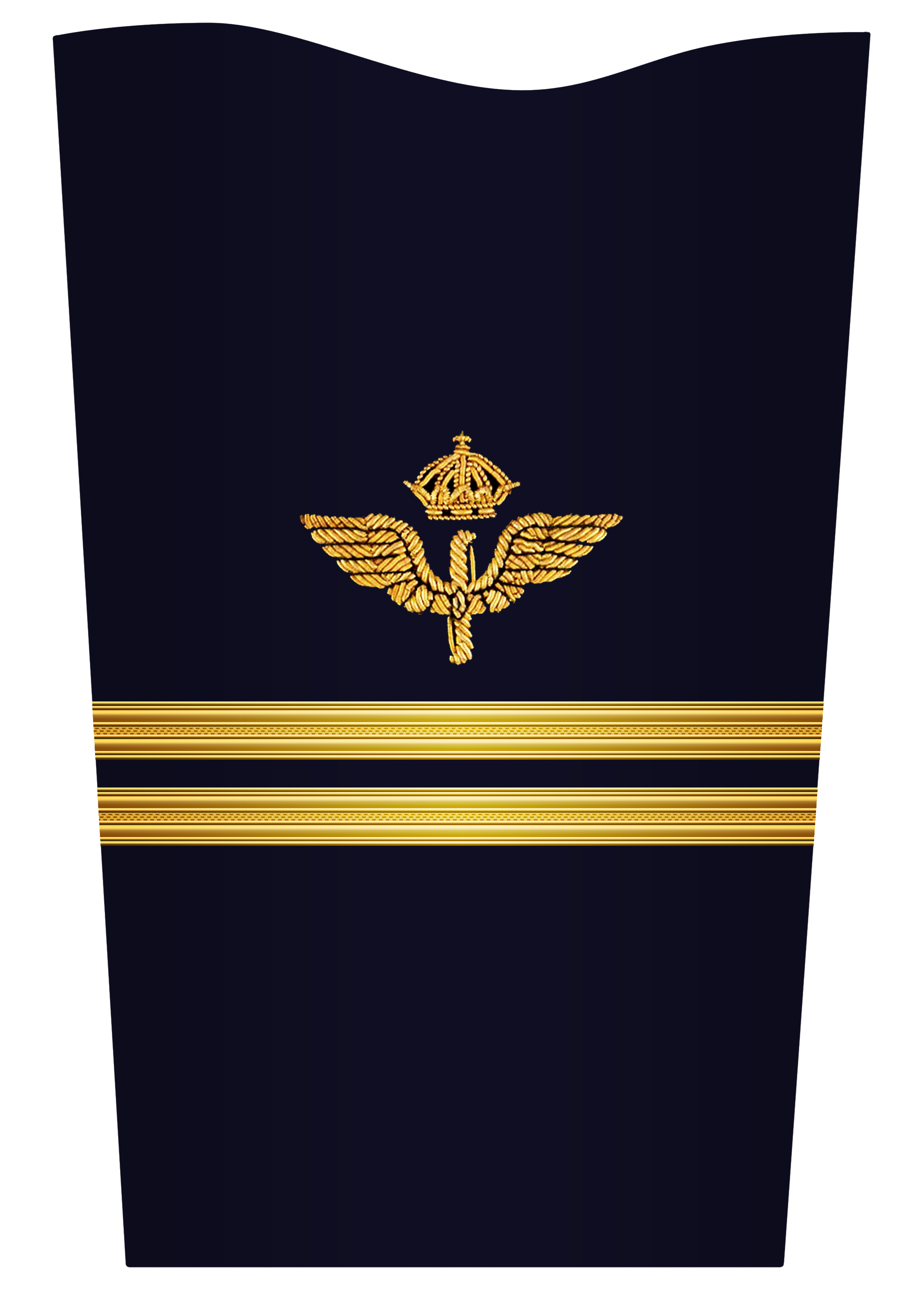
Mess jacket sleeve insignia for a lieutenant
(–2003)

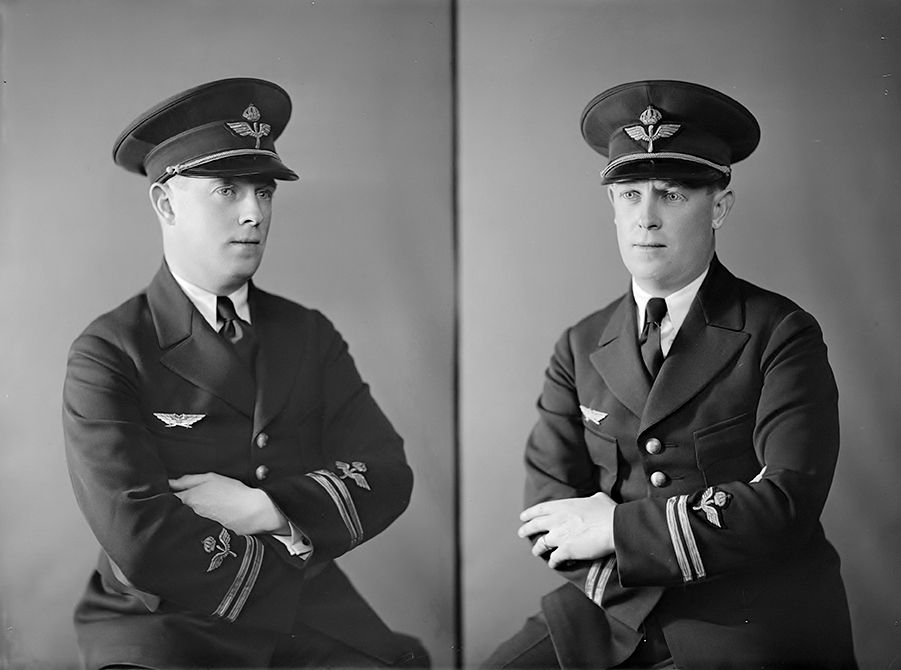
An air force officer with sleeve insignias for a lieutenant.

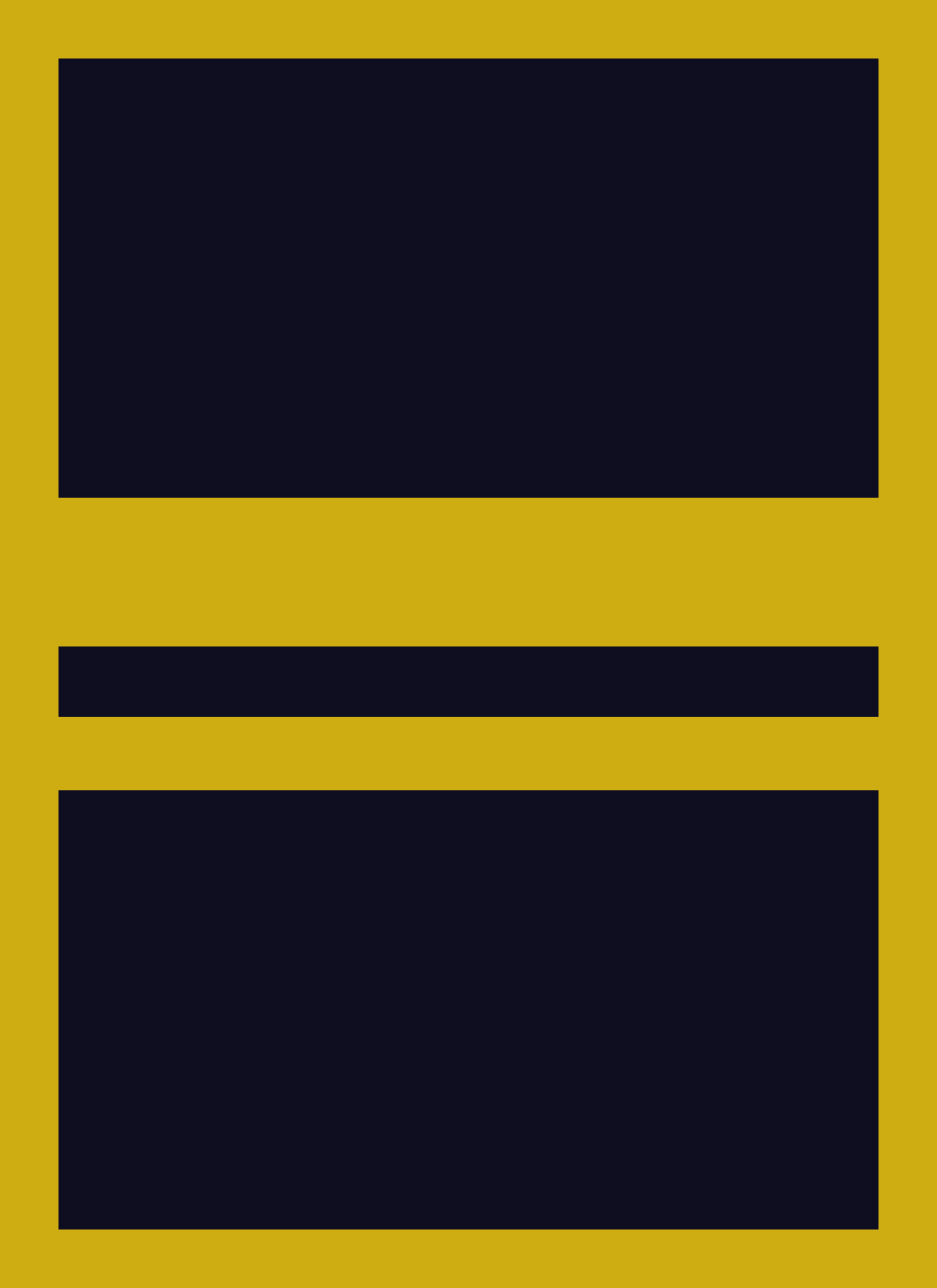
Flight suit sleeve insignia for a lieutenant
(2003–present)

===== Army =====
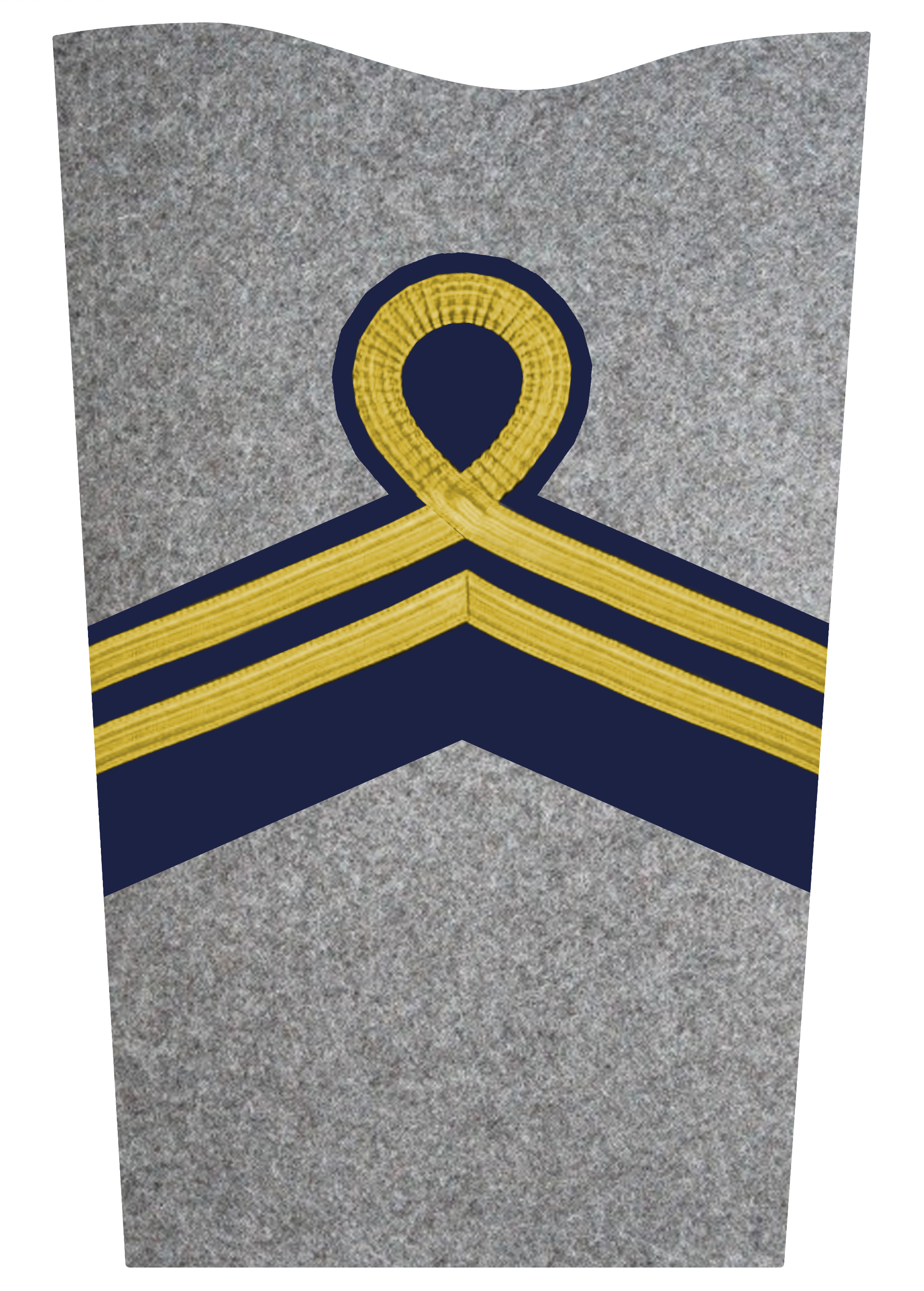
Sleeve insignia on uniform m/1906 for a lieutenant.

===== Navy (Amphibious Corps) =====
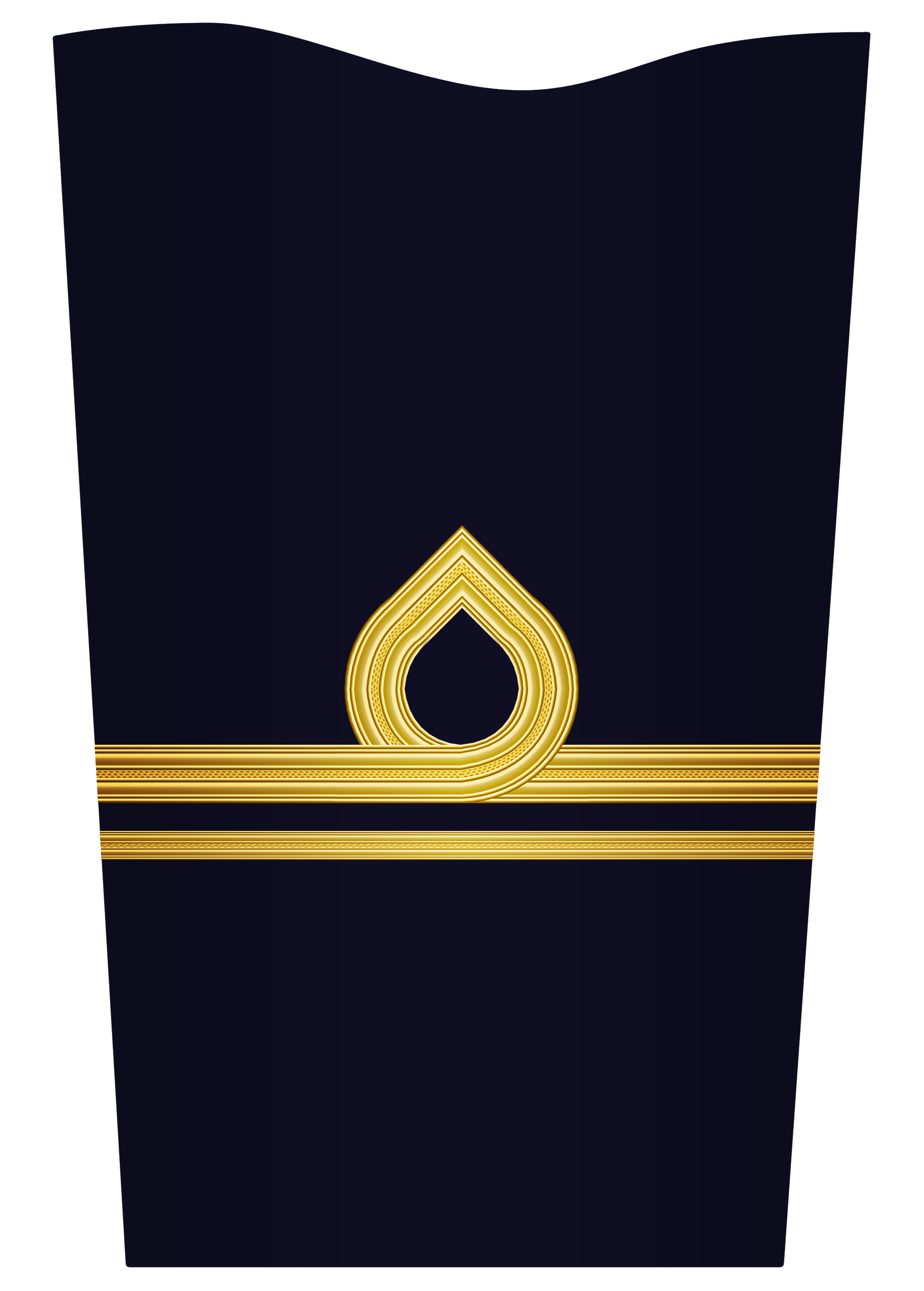
Sleeve insignia on innerkavaj m/48 ("inner jacket m/48") for a lieutenant.
(2003–present)

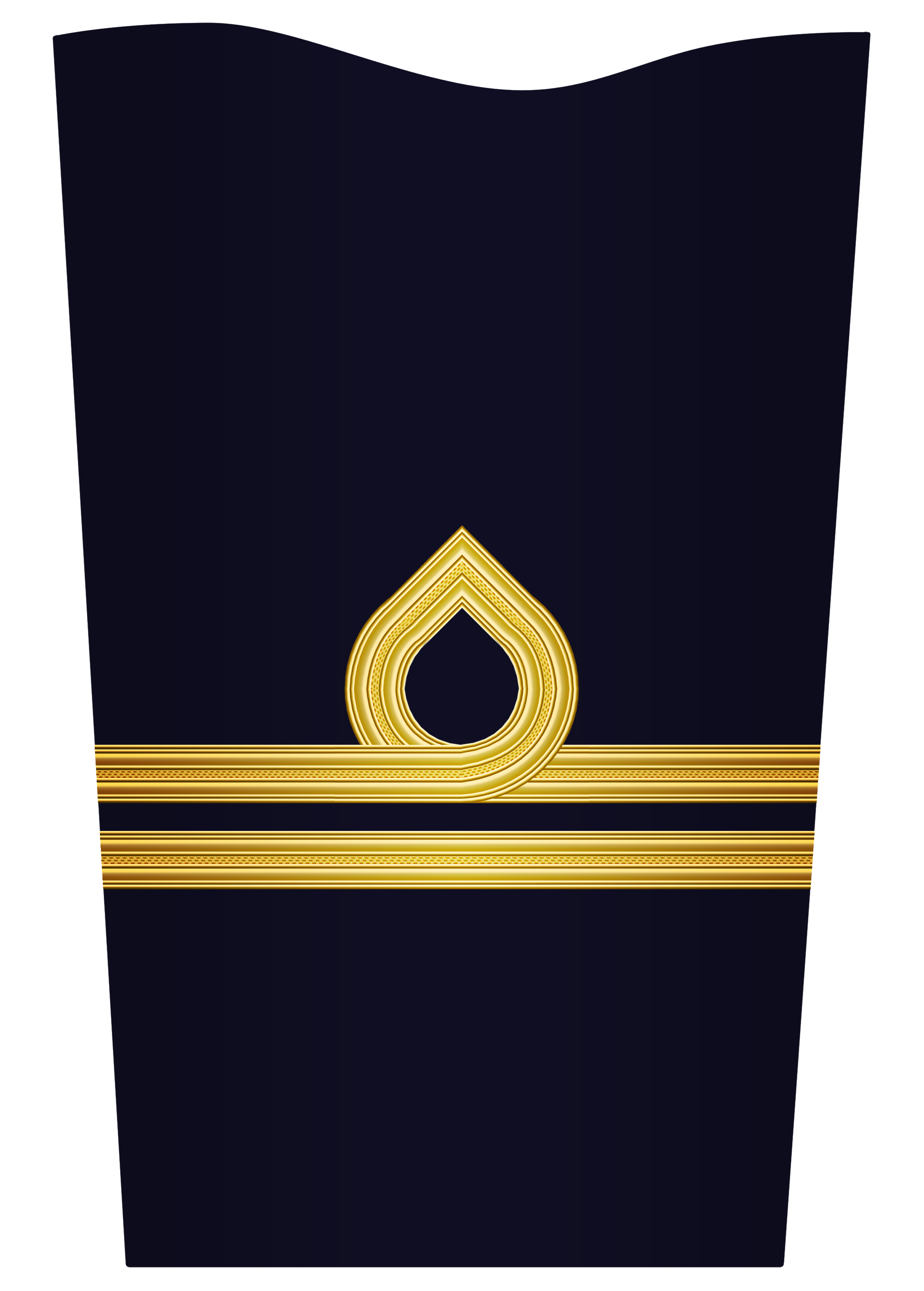
Sleeve insignia on innerkavaj m/48 ("inner jacket m/48") for a lieutenant.
(–2003)

=== Hats ===
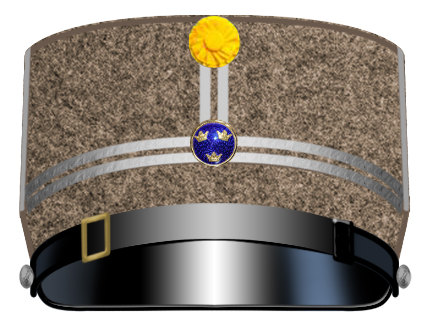
Hat (Mössa m/1923) for a lieutenant

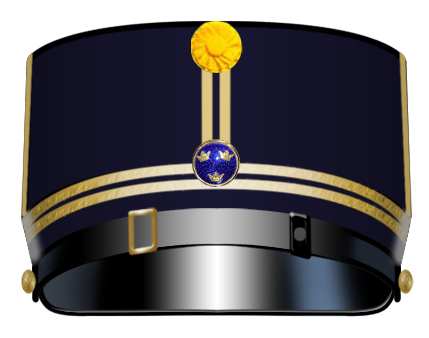
Camp hat (Lägermössa m/1865-99) for a lieutenant

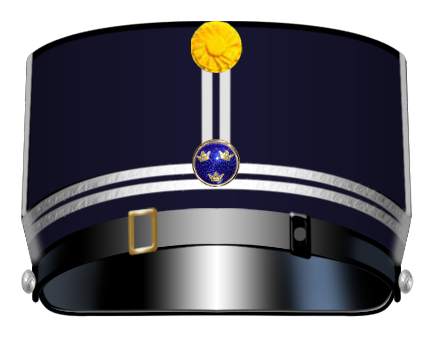
Hat (Mössa m/1865-99) for a lieutenant in the Life Guards infantry

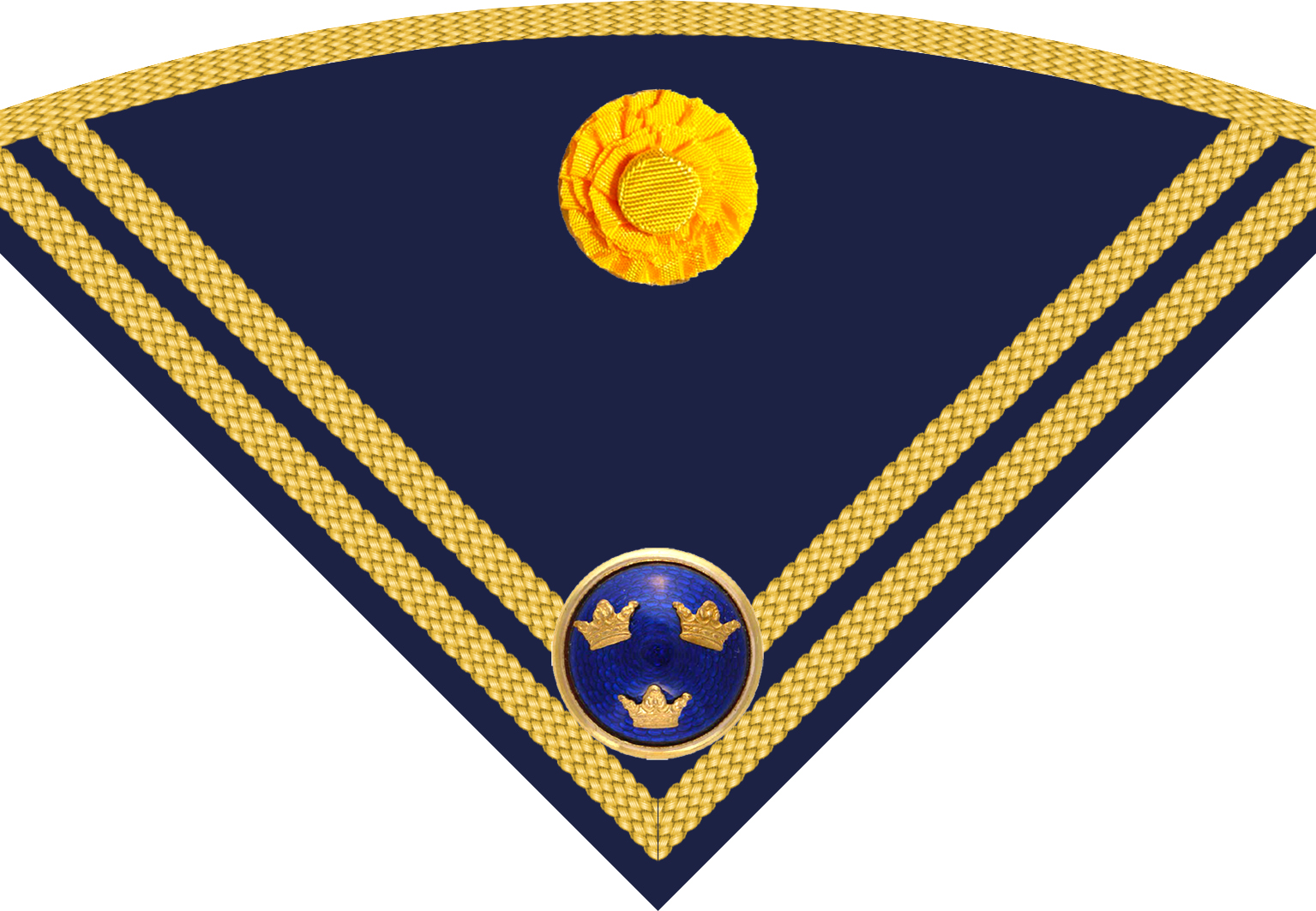
Rank insignia for a lieutenant on hat (Hatt m/1910-14) in the army
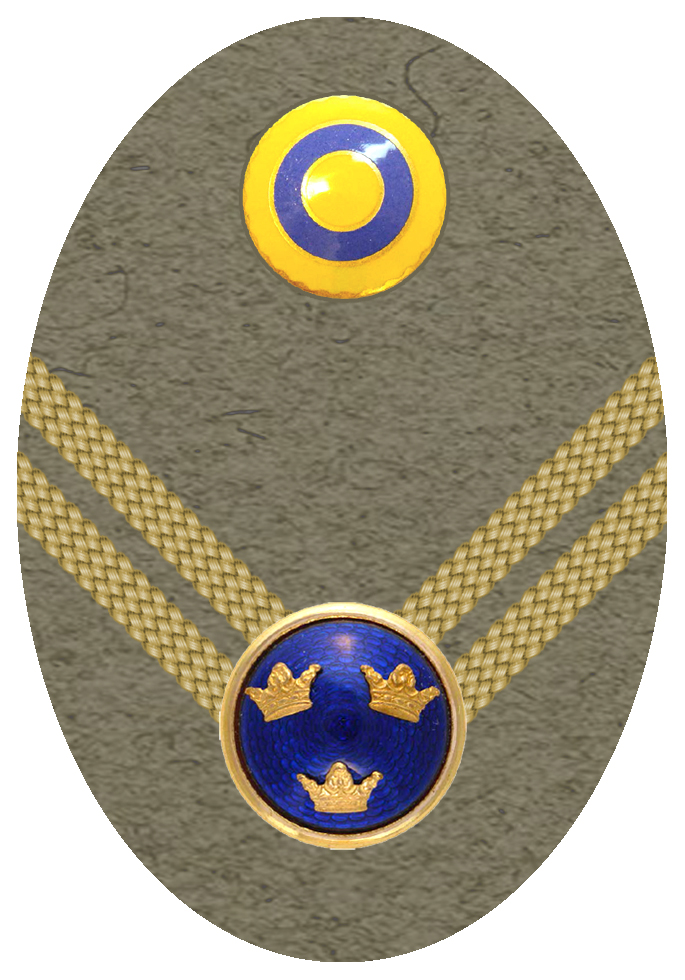
Hat badge (Mössmärke m/1946) for a lieutenant in the army

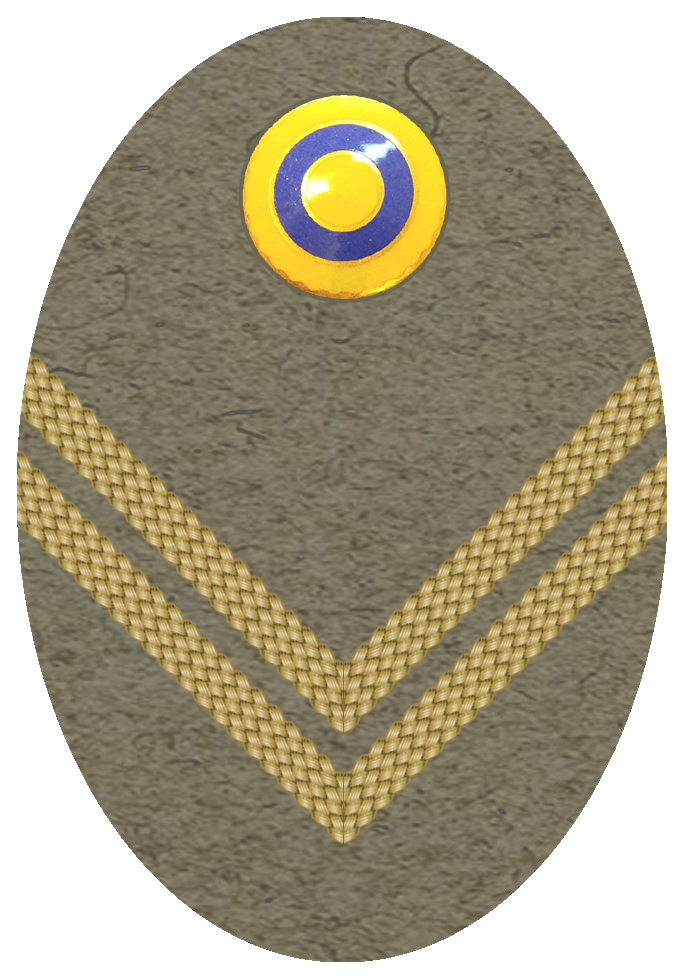
Hat badge (Mössmärke m/1940) for a lieutenant in the army

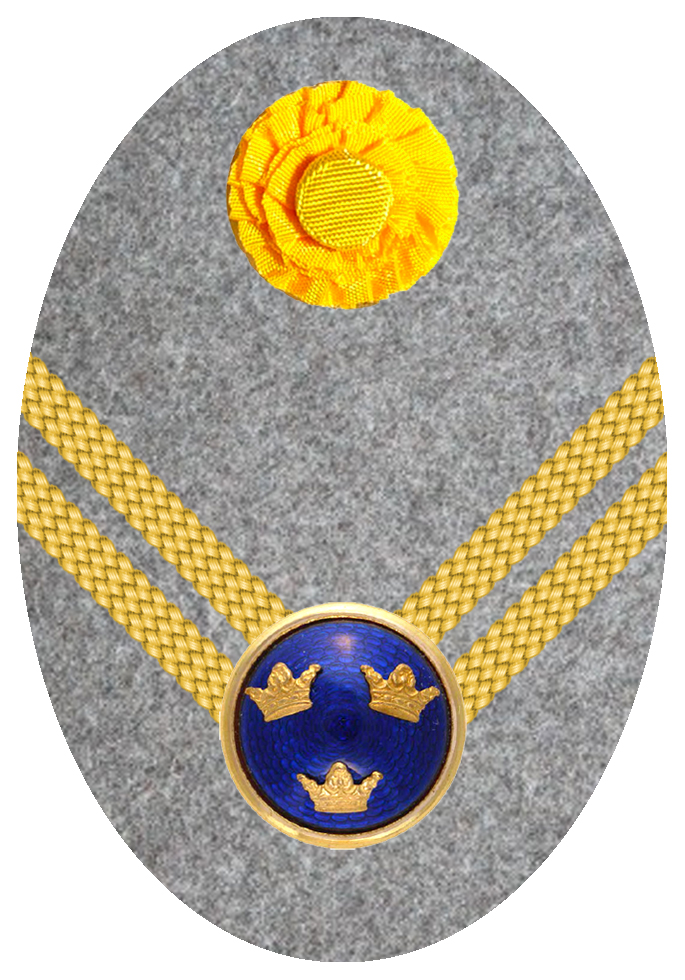
Hat badge (Mössmärke m/1914) for a lieutenant in the army on fur hat (pälsmössa m/1909-14)

== Navy ==
Sub lieutenant Löjtnant
- Country: Sweden
- Service branch: Navy
- Abbreviation: Lt (Swedish), SLt (English)
- Rank: Sub-lieutenant
- NATO rank code: OF-1
- Next higher rank: Lieutenant
- Next lower rank: Acting sub-lieutenant
- Equivalent ranks: Lieutenant (army/air force); Fanjunkare

Löjtnant (sub-lieutenant) is a rank in the Swedish Navy.

=== History ===
The rank of löjtnant (sub-lieutenant) appears for the first time during the latter part of the Middle Ages. Originally, it designated the (commander's) deputy, of which the compositions were lieutenant general, lieutenant colonel and captain lieutenant, and sometimes also the lowest commander's deputy. Eventually the word changed to refer exclusively to the company commander's deputy, and even later the rank fänrik (or cornet) for the lowest officer rank was replaced by lieutenant, after which the rank of lieutenant in Sweden was divided into two, löjtnant and underlöjtnant. The fänrik rank was reintroduced in 1914 with the same status as underlöjtnant, but it was subsequently moved one level below underlöjtnant in 1926. Underlöjtnant was removed from the Swedish Armed Forces rank structure in 1937.

=== Promotion ===
According to Chapter 2, Section 1 of FFS 2018:7, a person who is eligible for promotion has served in the Swedish Armed Forces to such an extent that assessment of suitability, knowledge and skills could be carried out, is deemed suitable for promotion, possesses the knowledge and skills required for the higher rank, and meets time requirements according to Section 2 (must have held the rank for at least two years). For promotion from acting sub-lieutenant to sub-lieutenant may take place if the acting sub-lieutenant holds an academic degree at the undergraduate level. An acting sub-lieutenant who has completed the Swedish Armed Forces' pilot training with an approved result may be promoted to sub-lieutenant without holding an academic degree at the undergraduate level. Promotion of sub-lieutenant to lieutenant, it is only required that the sub-lieutenant is promotable according to Chapter 2, Section 1. For a sub-lieutenant who has completed the Swedish Armed Forces' pilot training, promotion may only take place if the sub-lieutenant has an academic degree at the undergraduate level.

In the case of reserve officers, promotion of acting sub-lieutenant to sub-lieutenant may take place if the acting sub-lieutenant holds an academic degree at the undergraduate level, or at least 180 higher education credits (högskolepoäng) if the program comprises more higher education credits than 180. Promotion of sub-lieutenant to lieutenant may take place if the sub-lieutenant holds an academic degree at the undergraduate level, or at least 180 higher education credits if the program comprises more higher education credits than 180.

=== Uniform ===
==== Shoulder marks ====
The top galloon is shaped like a "loop" for an officer in the Swedish Navy (the loop is shaped like a "grenade" for an officer in the Swedish Amphibious Corps). The rank insignia is worn on the shoulder mark to jacket and coat (jacka m/87, kappa m/87), as well as to blue wool sweater (blå ylletröja m/87), trench coat (trenchcoat m/84), sea coat (sjörock 93, black raincoat and to white shirt (vit skjorta m/78). Rank insignia on shoulder mark (axelklaffshylsa 02B) is worn on all garments with shoulder straps.

1. The shoulder mark (Axelklaffshylsa m/02B) is designed as galloons sewn directly to another shoulder mark (axelklaffshylsa m/87 blå). Since 2003 it consists of two gold galloons, one wider and one narrower. Before 2003, it consisted of two equally wide gold galloons.

2. Before 2003, a sub-lieutenant wore two equally wide gold galloons. Since 2003, this shoulder mark is used by a lieutenant.

3. The wowen shoulder mark (AXELKLAFFSHYLSA M/02 INVÄVD KAPTEN FLOTTAN) is worn on the naval combat dress (sjöstridsdräkt m/93), duty uniform (arbetsdräkt m/87 (blå)) and combat uniform (Fältuniform m/90 lätt, m/90 lätt blå, m/90 tropik (green, beige and blue)).

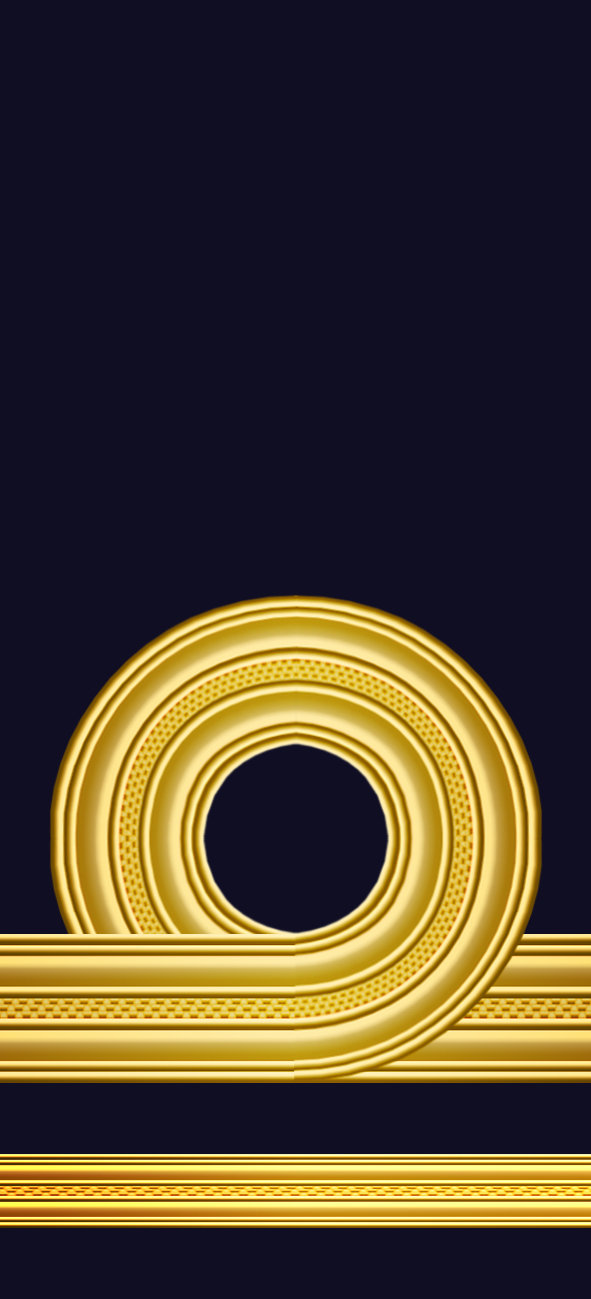
1. Embroidered shoulder mark (2003–present)

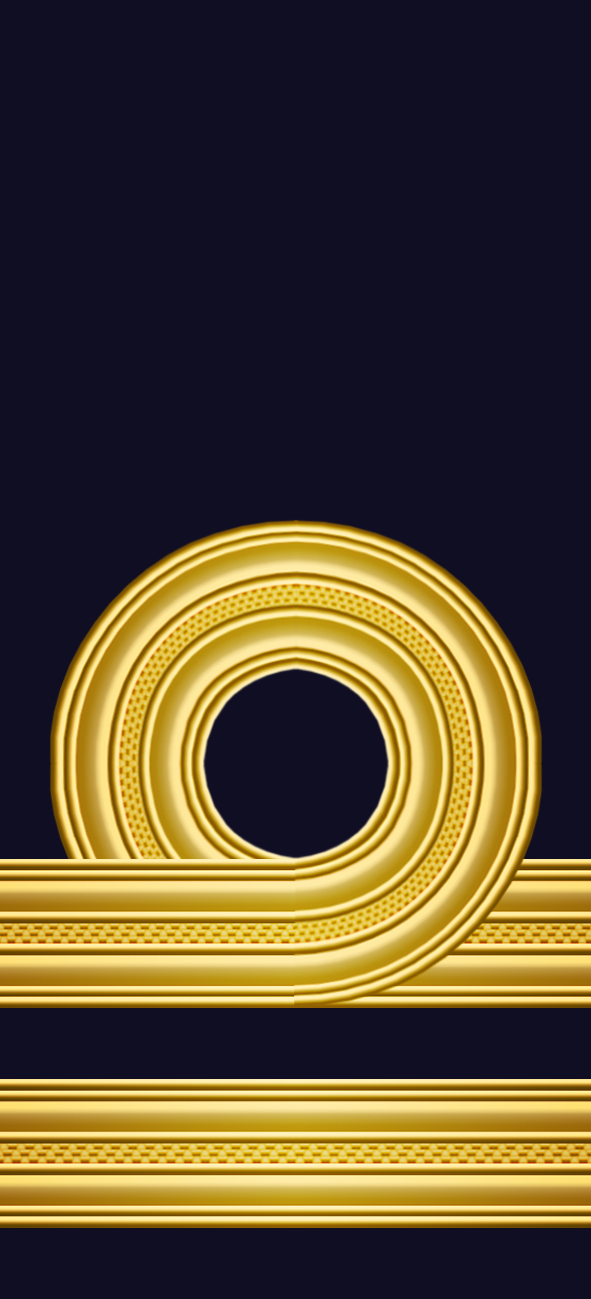
2. Embroidered shoulder mark (–2003)

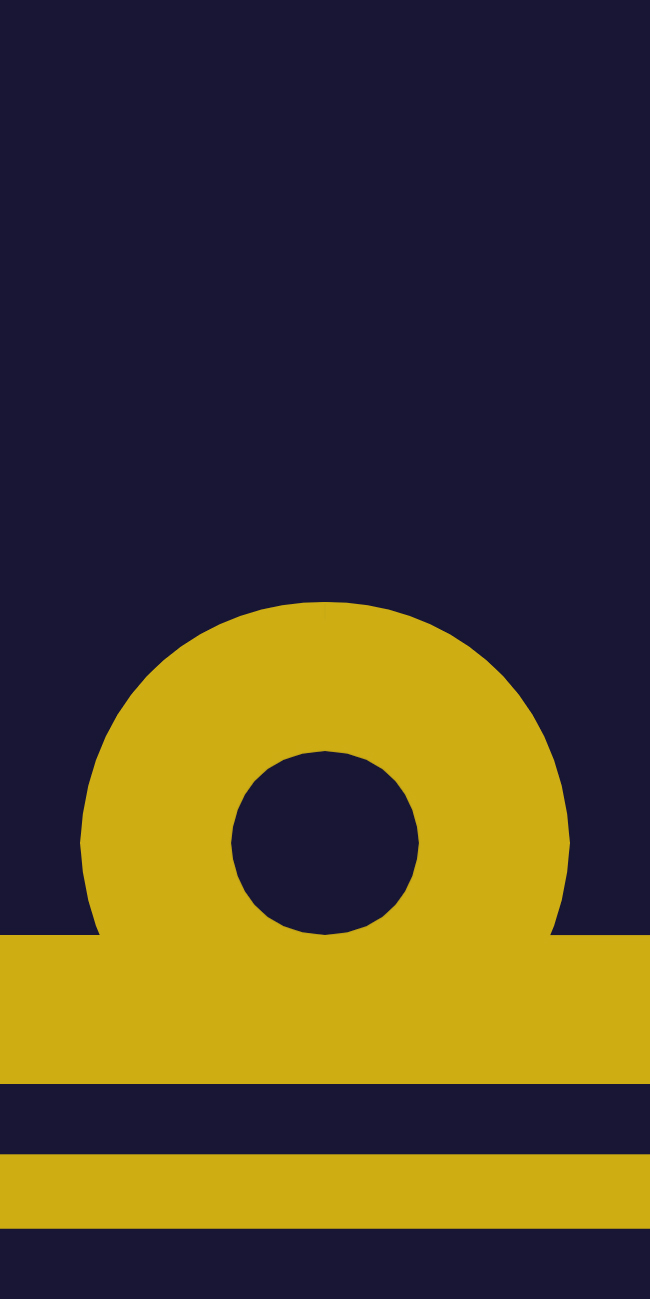
3. Wowen shoulder mark (2003–present)

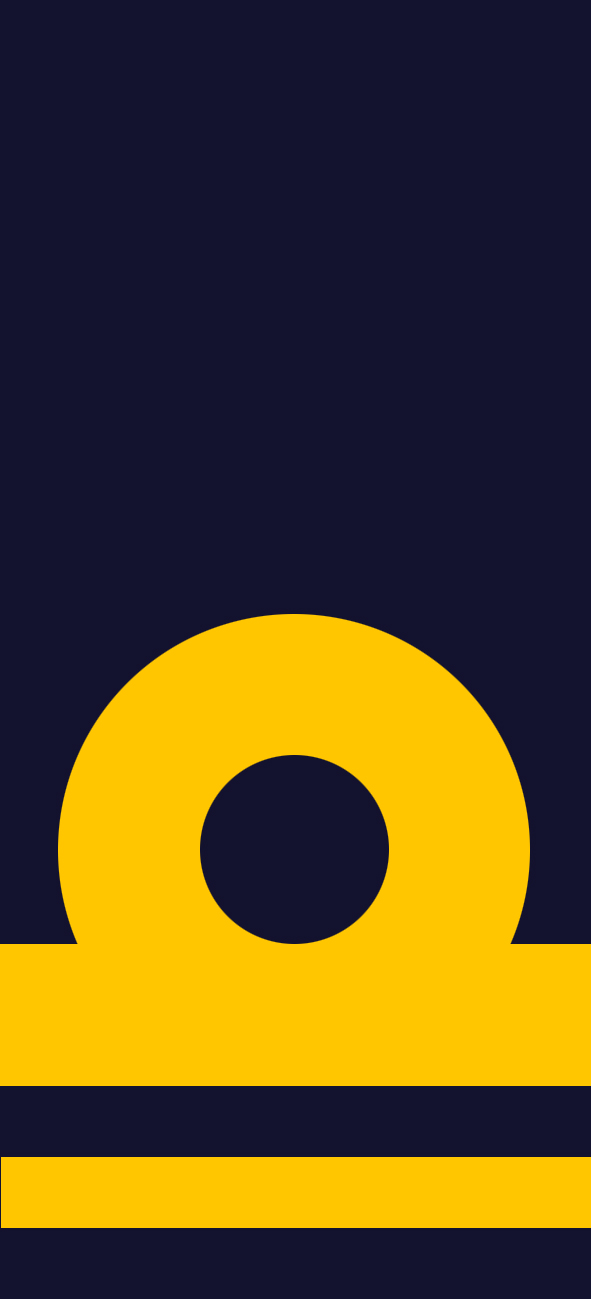
3. Wowen shoulder mark (2003–present)

==== Sleeve insignias ====
Rank insignia is worn on both sleeves for inner suit jacket (innerkavaj m/48) and mess jacket (mässjacka m/1878).

1. On the sleeve an 12,6 mm rank insignia (gradbeteckning m/02) and galloon (galon m/02). The distance between galloons should be 6 mm. The distance from the bottom edge of the sleeve to the bottom edge of the top galloon should be 100 mm.

2. Before 2003, sub-lieutenants wore two gold galloons and a loop of gold galloon. Since 2003, this type of sleeve insignia is used by a lieutenant.

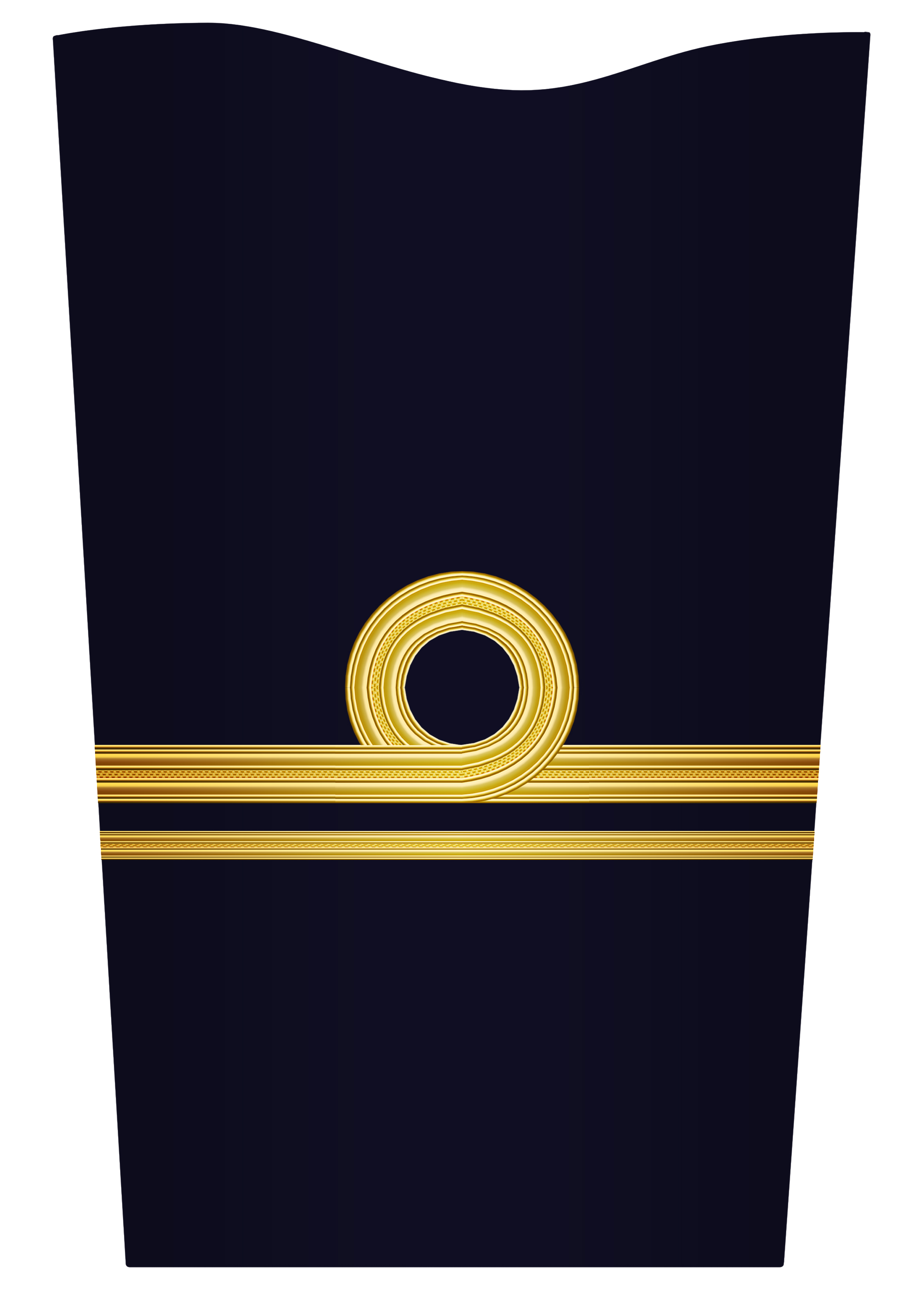
1. Sleeve insignia for a sub-lieutenant (2003–present)

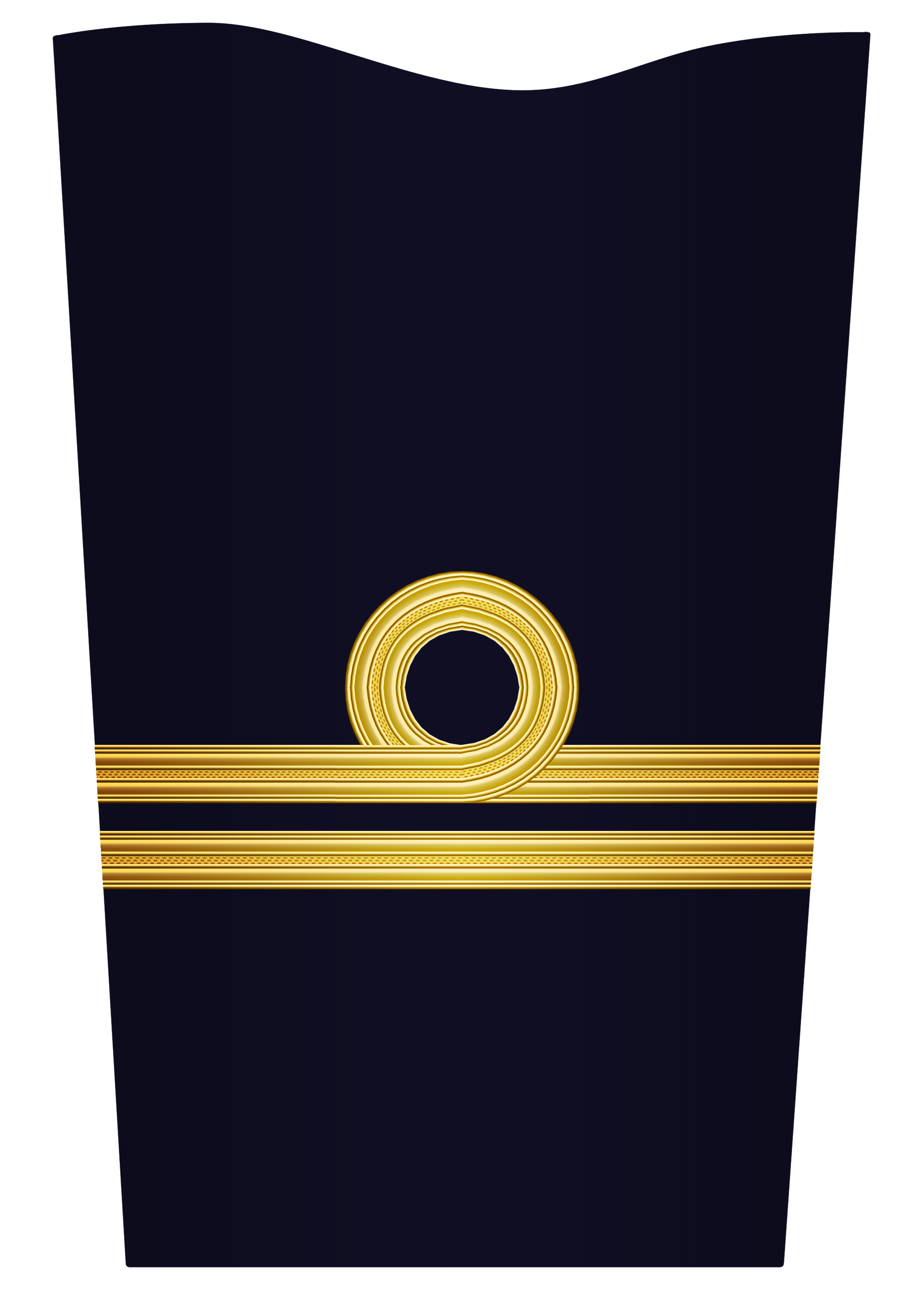
2. Sleeve insignia for a sub-lieutenant (1987–2003)

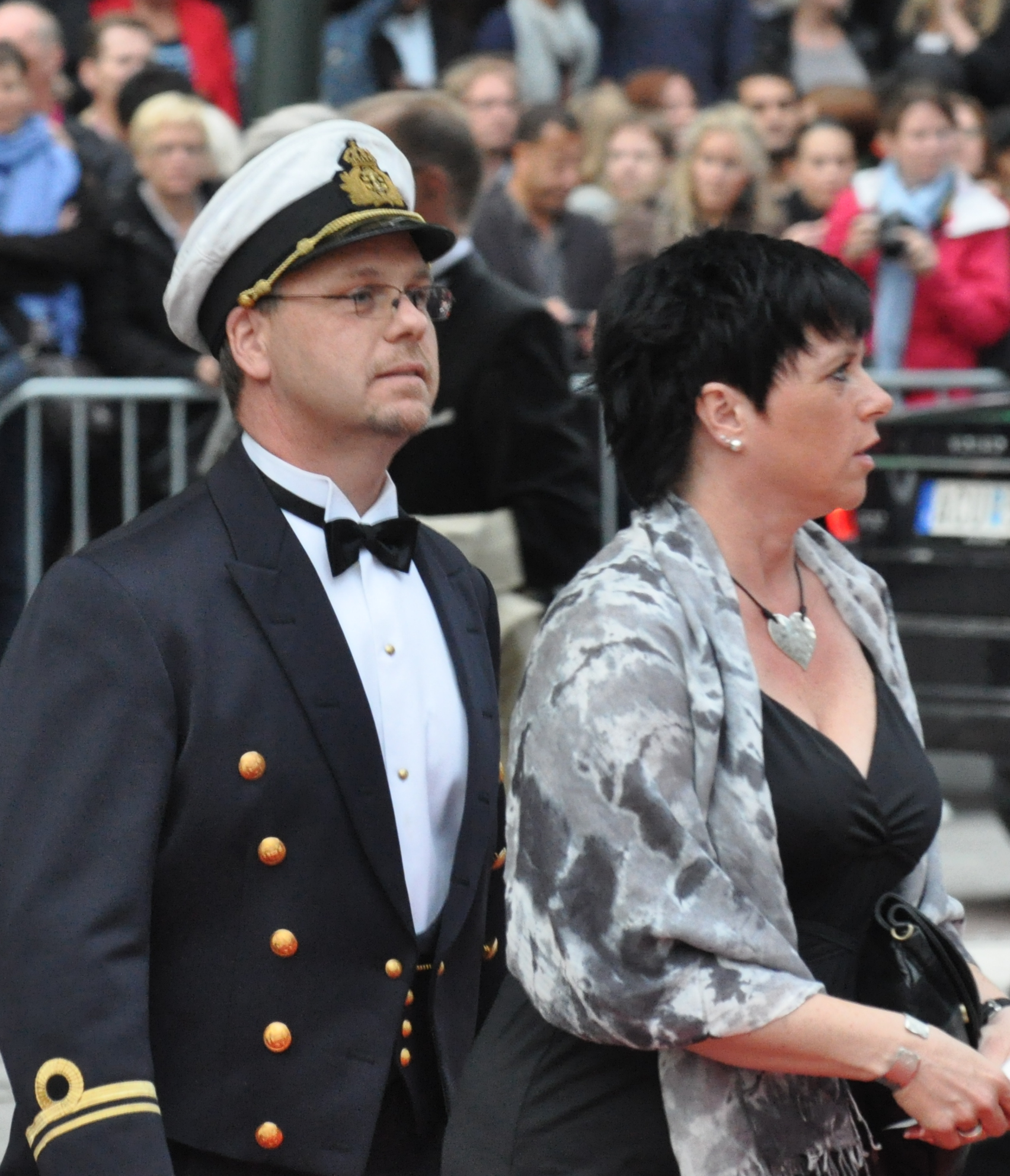
A naval officer with sleeve insignias for a sub-lieutenant.

==== Hats ====
===== Peaked cap =====
A sub-lieutenant wears a peaked cap (skärmmössa m/48) which is fitted with a hat badge (mössmärke m/78 off för flottan) and with a lacing in form of a golden thread (mössnodd m/82).

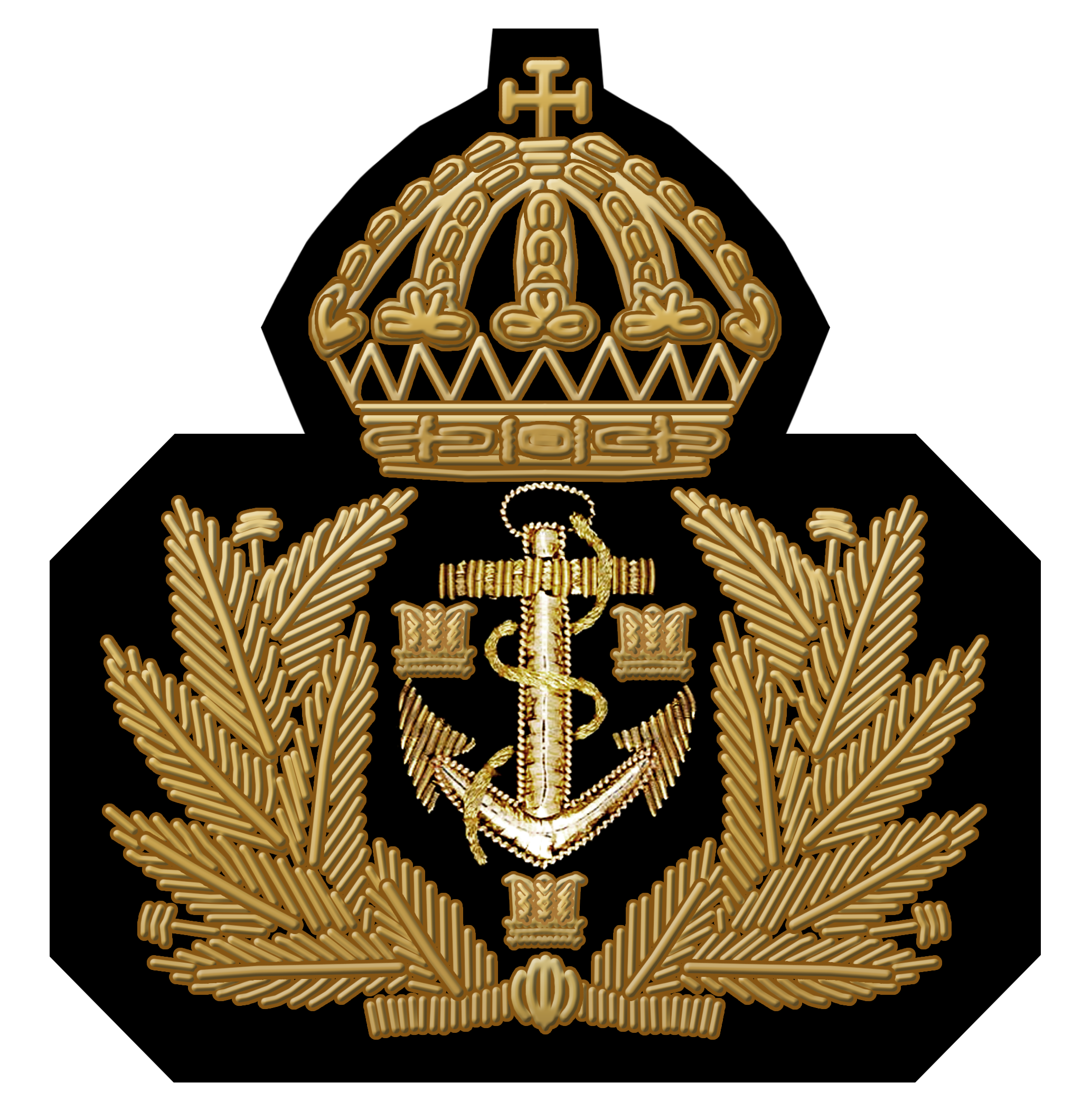
Hat badge

===== Side cap and winter hat =====
An officer wears a hat badge (mössmärke m/78 off) for the navy and another (mössmärke m/87 off) for amphibious units on the side cap (båtmössa m/48) and on the winter hat (vintermössa m/87).

==== Epaulette ====
A sub-lieutenant wears epaulette's (epålett m/1878) to white tie (frack m/1878) and to coat (rock m/1878). On the epaulette, a sub-lieutenant wears 2 mm fringes in two rows.
