= Commandant of Stockholm =

Military position in Sweden

- Kommendanten i Stockholm
- Incumbent; Capt (N) Magnus Lüning, Swedish Navy since 2023
- Reports to: Commandant General in Stockholm
- Appointer: Chief of Defence
- Term length: Not fixed
- Constituting instrument: FFS 2018:3; FFS 2018:6
- Formation: 1858 and 1936
- First holder: Hugo Cederschiöld
- Deputy: Chief of the Commandant Staff

The Commandant of Stockholm (Swedish: Kommendanten i Stockholm) is a military position in Sweden with responsibility for state ceremonial activities. The Commandant of Stockholm is deputy to the Commandant General in Stockholm. Since the post was reintroduced in 1936, the Commandant of Stockholm has at the same time served as either Defence District Commander for Stockholm Defence District (1938–1973), commander of Life Guard Dragoons with Stockholm Defence District (1973–1984), commander of Svea Life Guards with Stockholm Defence District (1984–2000), commander of the Life Guards (2000–2017) and commander of the Central Military Region (2018–present).

== History ==
Colonel Carl Rosenblad died on 11 July 1926, shortly after he had left his post as the last Commandant of Stockholm and was at the same time appointed major general in the reserve. The previously existing commandant post for Stockholm was re-established in 1936 and the Commandant of Stockholm became in 1938 Defence District Commander for Stockholm Defence District (Fo 44).

Fo 44 was co-located in the years 1975–1985 with Life Guard Dragoons (K 1), and when K 1 was disbanded on 30 September 1984, the tasks of the defence district were transferred to the Svea Life Guards (I 1). In 1984, K 1/Fo 44 was disbanded and the regiment's name was changed. Svea Life Guards with Stockholm Defence District (I 1/Fo 44) took over the task as lower regional head of Stockholm Defence District and maintenance of cavalry units in the war organization. The regimental commander became the Commandant of Stockholm. The regimental commander's duties as Commandant of Stockholm, including state ceremonial activities, were coordinated by a garrison unit located at Stockholm Palace.

The regional command of central Sweden, the Central Military Region, was from the disbandment of the military districts in 2004 until November 2017 under the commander of the Life Guards. Because the commander of the Life Guards from 2004 was also responsible for regional command when the Central Military Region was connected to the Life Guards, the Commandant of Stockholm also took over the Commandant General in Stockholm's previous operational command duties.

From 2017, when special commanders for the military regions were appointed, the commander of the Central Military Region (still located at Kungsängen) became the Commandant of Stockholm while retaining operational responsibility. A certain return to the conditions up to 2004 thus took place with the difference that the general level (with the Commandant General in Stockholm) was moved from the military district/military region to the Swedish Armed Forces Headquarters. Previously, Defence District Commanders and also other regimental commanders in Stockholm Garrison have also served as commandants.

The Chief of the Commandant Staff (Kommendantsstaben) (formerly called adjutant and later head of the Garrison Department) with staff, is responsible under the Commandant General in Stockholm and the Commandant of Stockholm for the direct command of the Royal Guards service and the state ceremonial activities.

== Joint command ==
The post of the Commandant of Stockholm has been held by the following commanders:

- 1942–1975: The Defence District Commander of Stockholm Defence District (Fo 44)
- 1975–1984: CO of Life Guard Dragoons with Stockholm Defence District (K 1/Fo 44)
- 1984–2000: CO of Svea Life Guards and Stockholm Defence District (I 1/Fo 44)
- 2000–2017: CO of the Life Guards (LG)
- 2018–present: CO of the Central Military Region (MR M)

== Tasks ==
=== 2005–2018 ===
4 § according to the Swedish Armed Forces Code of Statutes 2005:6, the Commandant of Stockholm shall

1. cohesive and decide on the Royal Guards service,
2. cohesive other state ceremonial or other ceremonial activities, including coordination of the participation of agencies and organizations in such ceremonies,
3. at the request of the Speaker of the Riksdag, the Prime Minister, the Marshal of the Realm, a cabinet minister or the Swedish Armed Forces Headquarters, organize the participation of guard of honour or other military personnel or military band in such ceremonies as are referred to in 1 § 2,
4. cooperate with the Speaker of the Riksdag, the Prime Minister, the Marshal of the Realm and the Chief of His Majesty's Military Staff in ceremonial matters, and
5. continuously inform the Commandant General in Stockholm in matters concerning the state ceremonial activities.

5 § The Commandant shall decide the instructions for the Royal Guards at Stockholm Palace and Drottningholm Palace

6 § The Commandant decides on the Swedish Armed Forces Music Centre's (Försvarsmusikcentrum, FöMusC) participation in Royal Guards service and other ceremonial activities referred to in 1 § 2.

==== Common regulations for the Commandant and the Commandant General ====
7 § The Commandant General in Stockholm or the Commandant of Stockholm shall, if necessary, participate in such ceremonies as are referred to in 1 § 2. They shall also otherwise participate in receptions or visits if the King, temporary regent (Riksföreståndare), Speaker of the Riksdag, Prime Minister, Marshal of the Realm, cabinet minister or the Swedish Armed Forces Headquarters so request.

8 § It is the responsibility of the Commandant General in Stockholm or, when he has an impediment, the Commandant of Stockholm to receive in the Royal Guards Wing at Stockholm Palace such commanders of foreign military units who are on an official visit to Stockholm

==== Delegation ====
9 § The Commandant of Stockholm may hand over to the head of the Garrison Unit in the Life Guards to fulfill the duties incumbent on the Commandant.

==== Utilization of the Royal Guards units ====
10 § The power to use the Royal Guards units, including on and off units, is regulated in a special order.

=== 2018–present ===
According to the Swedish Armed Forces Code of Statutes 2018:3:

4 § the commander of the Central Military Region is the Commandant of Stockholm

5 § The Commandant of Stockholm shall, in the absence of the Commandant General in Stockholm, fulfill his duties at parades, receptions and representation

6 § The Commandant of Stockholm may hand over to the Chief of the Commandant Staff (Kommendantstaben) in Stockholm to fulfill the duties incumbent on the Commandant.

== Uniform ==
The Commandant of Stockholm (and the garrison commanders in Gothenburg and Karlsborg) is wearing a staff (m/1802) which is the same look as a vaktkäpp m/1793, 90 cm long but provided with a special porte-épée. The Commandant of Stockholm and officer in the Commandant Staff (Kommendantsstaben) may wear a hat (hatt m/1854-1859) with a yellow plume (plym m/1830).

== List of officeholders ==
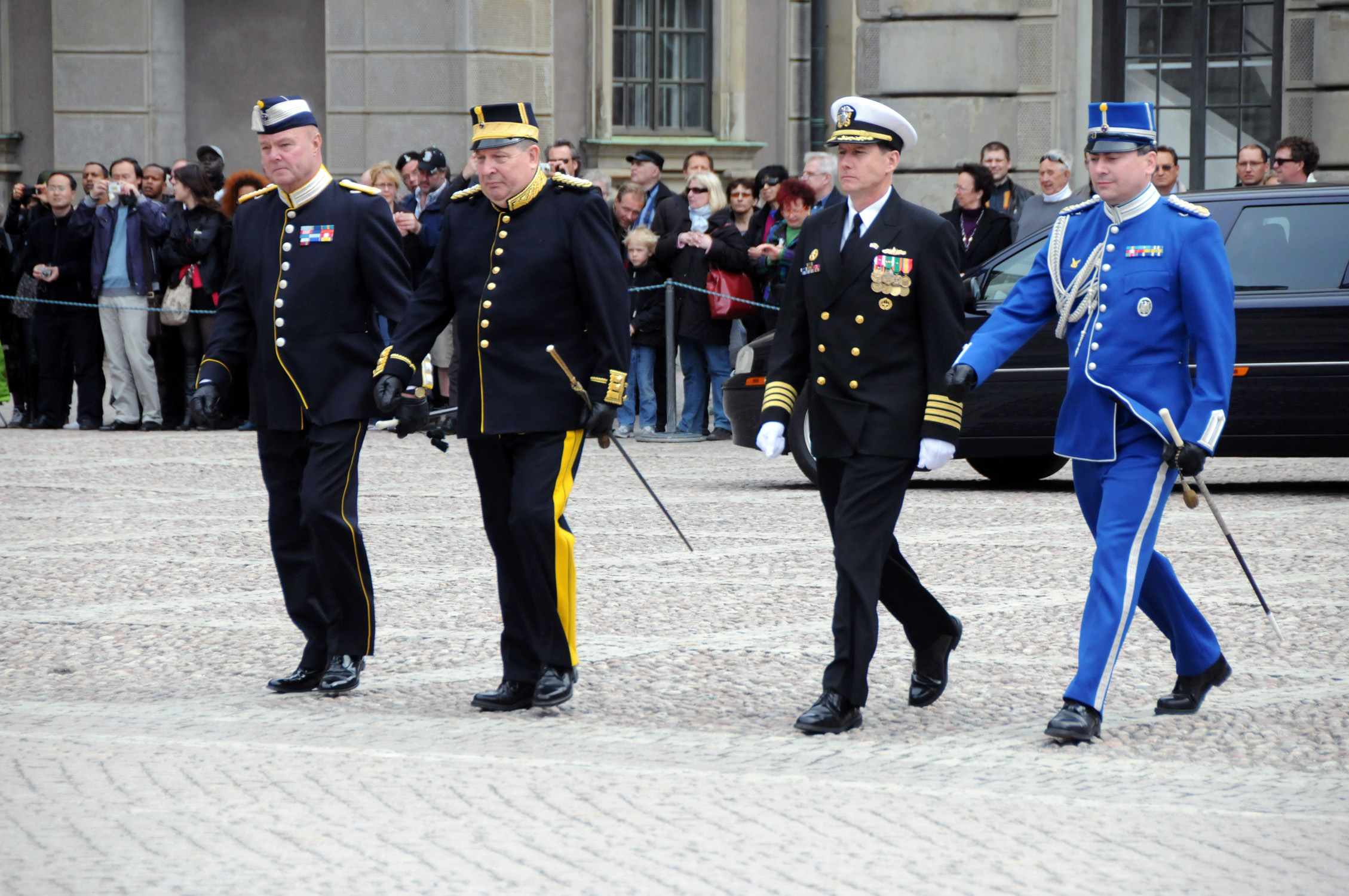
Commendant in Stockholm, Colonel Håkan Hedlund (far right)

- 1820–1854: Carl Ludvig Dævel
- 1854–1858: Adolf Ludvig de Maré
- 1858–1860: Fredrik von Troil (acting)
- 1860–1868: Fredrik von Troil
- 1868–1868: Gustaf Edvard Taube (acting from 10 October 1868)
- 1868–1899: Gustaf Edvard Taube
- 1899–1899: Gustaf Uggla (acting from 16 May to 7 July 1899)
- 1899–1909: Axel Laurell
- 1909–1915: Carl Ankarcrona
- 1915–1926: Carl Rosenblad
- 1926–1938: –
- 1938–1945: Hugo Cederschiöld (as CO of Fo 44/Fo 45 (Note: In 1942, Norrtälje Defence District (Fo 45) was incorporated, in such a way that it had a joint commander and staff with Stockholm Defence District (Fo 44). In 1946, Fo 45 was formally amalgamated into Fo 44.))
- 1945–1950: Nils Stenbeck (as CO of Fo 44)
- 1950–1957: Gustaf (Gösta) Magnus von Stedingk (as CO of Fo 44)
- 1957–1963: Carl-Johan Wachtmeister (as CO of Fo 44)
- 1963–1966: Per Tamm (as CO of Fo 44)
- 1966–1969: Carl Reuterswärd (as CO of Fo 44)
- 1969–1973: Nils-Ivar Carlborg (as CO of Fo 44)
- 1973–1976: Nils Östlund (as CO of K 1/Fo 44 (Note: Colonel Nils Östlund was commander of Fo 44 from 1973 to 1975 (when he was promoted to senior colonel) and of K 1 from 1975 to 1976.))
- 1976–1981: Nils Landergren (as CO of K 1/Fo 44)
- 1981–1984: Hodder Stjernswärd (as CO of K 1/Fo 44)
- 1984–1987: Rolf Frykhammar (as CO of I 1/Fo 44)
- 1987–1992: Jan-Olof Borgén (as CO of I 1/Fo 44)
- 1992–1994: Göran De Geer (as CO of I 1/Fo 44)
- 1994–1997: Markku Sieppi (as CO of I 1/Fo 44)
- 1997–2000: Kim Åkerman (as CO of I 1/Fo 44)
- 2000–2002: Ingvar Hellquist (as CO of LG)
- 2002–2005: Kent Edberg (as CO of LG)
- 2005–2009: Svante Borg (as CO of LG)
- 2009–2014: Håkan Hedlund (as CO of LG)
- 2014–2017: Christer Tistam (as CO of LG)
- 2017–2022: Thomas Karlsson (as CO of MR M)
- 2022–2023: Mattias Ardin (as CO of MR M)
- 2023–present: Magnus Lüning (as CO of MR M)

Legend:

- Fo 44 = Stockholm Defence District (Fo 44)
- Fo 45 = Norrtälje Defence District (Fo 45)
- K 1/Fo 44 = Life Guard Dragoons with Stockholm Defence District (K 1/Fo 44)
- I 1/Fo 44 = Svea Life Guards with Stockholm Defence District (I 1/Fo 44)
- LG = Life Guards (LG)
- MR M = Central Military Region (MR M)
