= Nils-Ivar Carlborg =

Swedish Army officer (1913–2005)

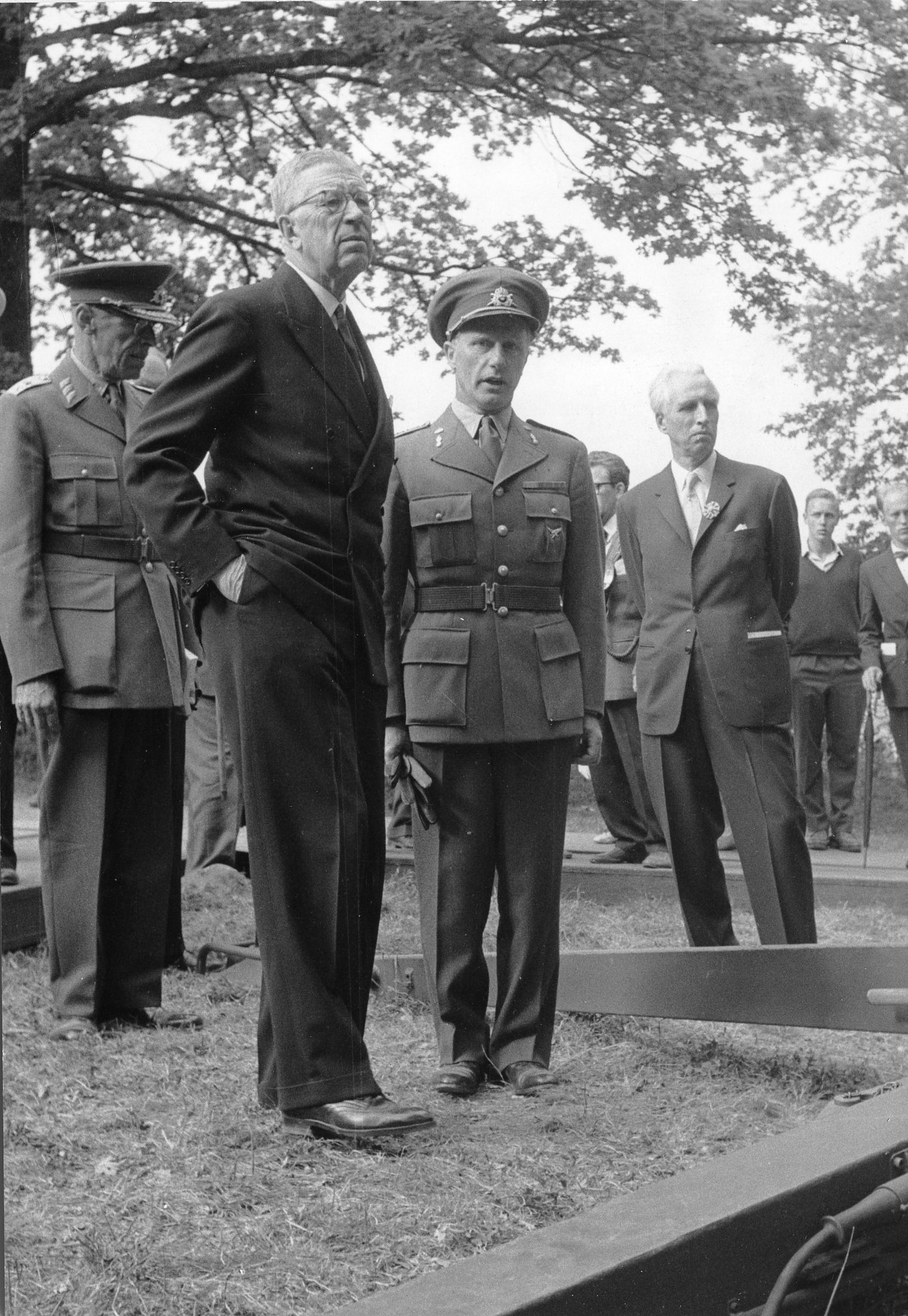
- Carlborg with King Gustaf VI Adolf in 1959.
- Born: Nils Ivar Carlborg; 29 March 1913; Jönköping, Sweden
- Died: 21 September 2005 (aged 92); Stockholm, Sweden
- Military career
- Allegiance: Sweden
- Branch: Swedish Army
- Service years: 1934–1973
- Rank: Colonel
- Commands: Swedish Army Paratroop School; Kalmar Defence District; Växjö Defence District; Military Academy Karlberg; Stockholm Defence District; Commandant of Stockholm

Nils Ivar (Nils-Ivar) Carlborg (29 March 1913 – 21 September 2005) was a Swedish Army officer. He started the paratrooper training in Sweden and founded the Swedish Army Paratroop School of which he was its first commander (1952–1953). He later served as head of the Military Academy Karlberg (1964–1969) and as commander of Stockholm Defence District (1969–1973) and as the Commandant of Stockholm (1969–1973).

== Early life ==
Carlborg was born on 29 March 1913 in Småland Artillery Regiment Parish in Jönköping, Sweden, the son of Lieutenant Colonel Nils Gustaf Carlborg and Elisabeth Hugoson. Carlborg passed studentexamen in Skövde in 1931.

== Career ==
Carlborg graduated from Military Academy Karlberg in 1934 and was commissioned as an officer the same year and was assigned to Svea Artillery Regiment as a second lieutenant, where he was promoted to underlöjtnant in 1936, and to lieutenant in 1938 and to captain in 1942. He attended the General Artillery Course at the Artillery and Engineering College from 1936 to 1938 and studied at the Royal Swedish Army Staff College from 1940 to 1942. He entered the General Staff Corps in 1944 and served for the next few years in staffs, among other things in the Army Inspectorate (Arméinspektionen) in the Army Staff where in 1948 he was given the task of writing regulations for combat against airborne forces. To gain personal insight into an attacker's possibilities and limitations, he underwent parachute training in the United States. The experience from this led him to propose that Swedish airborne ranger units be established, as the costs should be able to be reduced to a reasonable level. The proposal was heard and a trial course in parachute service was held under his leadership in 1951. This in turn led to the formation of the Swedish Army Paratroop School in 1952. Carlborg was promoted to major in Boden Artillery Regiment this year and was the school's first head from 1952 to 1953. He was transferred to Småland Artillery Regiment in 1954 and served in the Army Staff from 1955.

In 1957 he was promoted to lieutenant colonel at Småland Artillery Regiment and during the same year he served as acting regimental commander of the regiment, after which he served in the regiment until 1960. In 1960 he was promoted to colonel in Småland Artillery Regiment, whereupon he served as Defence District Commander of Kalmar Defence District (Kalmar försvarsområde, Fo 18) and of Växjö Defence District (Växjö försvarsområde, Fo 16) from 1960 to 1961 and as army attaché at the Swedish Embassy in London and in The Hague from 1961 to 1964. Carlborg was head of Military Academy Karlberg from 1964 to 1969 and served as Defence District Commander of Stockholm Defence District and as Commandant of Stockholm from 1969 to 1973.

After retiring from the military, Carlborg was national corps commander of the National Association of Volunteer Motor Transport Corps from 1973 to 1975 and as chairman of Stockholm Shooting Federation (Stockholms skytteförbund) until 1976.

== Personal life ==
Carlborg married in 1941 to Ann-Mari Eklind (born 1920), the daughter of the engineer Ragnar Eklind and Ruth Berglund. They had three children: Hans (born 1943), Jan (born 1945), and Björn (born 1947).

After his retirement, Carlborg moved to Alicante, Spain.

== Death ==
Carlborg died on 21 September 2005 in Oscar Parish in Stockholm.

== Dates of rank ==
- 1934 – Second lieutenant
- 1936 – Underlöjtnant
- 1938 – Lieutenant
- 1942 – Captain
- 1952 – Major
- 1957 – Lieutenant colonel
- 1960 – Colonel

== Awards and decorations ==
- (Sweden) Commander 1st Class of the Order of the Sword (1968)
- (Sweden) Commander of the Order of the Sword (1964)
- (Sweden) Knight 1st Class of the Order of the Sword (1953)
- (Sweden) Knight 1st Class of the Order of Vasa (1952)
- (Sweden) Silver Medal for Noble Deeds
- (Sweden) Army Shooting Medal (SkytteM)

Military offices
Preceded by None	Swedish Army Paratroop School; 1952–1953	Succeeded by Nils Engelheart
Preceded by Åke Grahnberg	Kalmar Defence District; 1960–1961	Succeeded by Fred Ljunggren
Preceded by Åke Grahnberg	Växjö Defence District; 1960–1961	Succeeded by Fred Ljunggren
Preceded by Anders Grafström	Military Academy Karlberg; 1964–1969	Succeeded by Gösta Gärdin
Preceded by Carl Reuterswärd	Stockholm Defence District; 1969–1973	Succeeded by Nils Östlund
Preceded by Carl Reuterswärd	Commandant of Stockholm; 1969–1973	Succeeded by Nils Östlund
Other offices
Preceded by Gunnar Löfroth	National Association of Volunteer Motor Transport Corps; 1973–1975	Succeeded by Curt Hermanson
