= Stockholm Defence District =

- Stockholms försvarsområde
- Active: 1939–2000
- Country: Sweden
- Allegiance: Swedish Armed Forces
- Branch: Joint service
- Type: Defence district
- Part of: IV Military District (1942–1966); Eastern Military District (1966–1975); Life Guard Dragoons (1975–1984); Svea Life Guards (1984–2000)
- Garrison/HQ: Stockholm

Stockholm Defence District (Swedish: Stockholms försvarsområde, Fo 44), was a Swedish defence district which operated from 1939 to 2000. Fo 44 was responsible for the defence of Stockholm and its key task was to protect the national Swedish administration, that is, the head of state (king), parliament and the Swedish government.

== History ==
The Stockholm Defence District (Fo 44) was formed on 3 September 1939 and included Stockholm, Södertälje, Lidingö and Sundbyberg as well as surrounding police superintendent (landsfiskal) districts. A key task for Fo 44 was to protect the national administration, that is, the head of state (king), the parliament and the Swedish government and the most important parts of the government offices. In the autumn of 1939, the forces in the Stockholm Defence District consisted, after mobilizing, of three surveillance battalions (three to four companies each), the landstorm regiment I 101 (two battalions with a total of eight reinforced companies), two automobile companies, four vehicle-drawn artillery batteries, one engineer company, five working departments, the local defence anti-aircraft regiment A 101 (five divisions with a total of 4,000 men), maintenance units and a large number of smaller units, including two air surveillance companies and two landstorm police companies. In 1940, Södertörn Defence District was amalgamated into Fo 44, with the exception of Stockholm archipelago, and in 1942 the Norrtälje Defence District (Fo 45) was amalgamated into Fo 44, which in turn got a joint commander and staff with Fo 44. In 1946, Fo 45 also formally ceased and became part of Stockholm Defence District. Through the Defence Act of 1942, defence districts were also introduced into the Peace Organization at the same time as the army divisional and military district staffs were merged into military commanding staffs (militärbefälsstaber), with both operational and territorial responsibility. Fo 44 then came to belong to IV Military District. Fo 44's staff site was initially in the Royal Guards Wing of the Stockholm Palace, then at different addresses (during the spring of 1940 at Hotel Carlton) but from September 1942 in the property at Storgatan 30 at Östermalm.

Of the battle plan from 1952, it shows that Fo 44's main task according to the military district order was to avvärja ("averting") the so-called Stenstaden ("City of Stone"), that is the center of Stockholm. Orders included defence of Stockholm but also of the bridge links across the Södertälje Canal. Furthermore, air landings in connection with the air bases and at the airfields at Halmsjön (later renamed Arlanda), Skå-Edeby and Skarpnäck would be averted and the air bases Barkarby, Tullinge, and Bromma as well as the airfield at Halmsjön would be defended. By the concept of "averting" according to the military nomenclature, it was meant that the enemy attack force would be interrupted, which in turn meant a mobile defence battle. From 1957 to 1971, the Stockholm Defence District's staff was located in an underground facility which they intended to use during wartime. The facility, codenamed Elias, was very extensive in order to be able to accommodate even the war organization of the Stockholm County Administrative Board (Stockholms länsstyrelse).

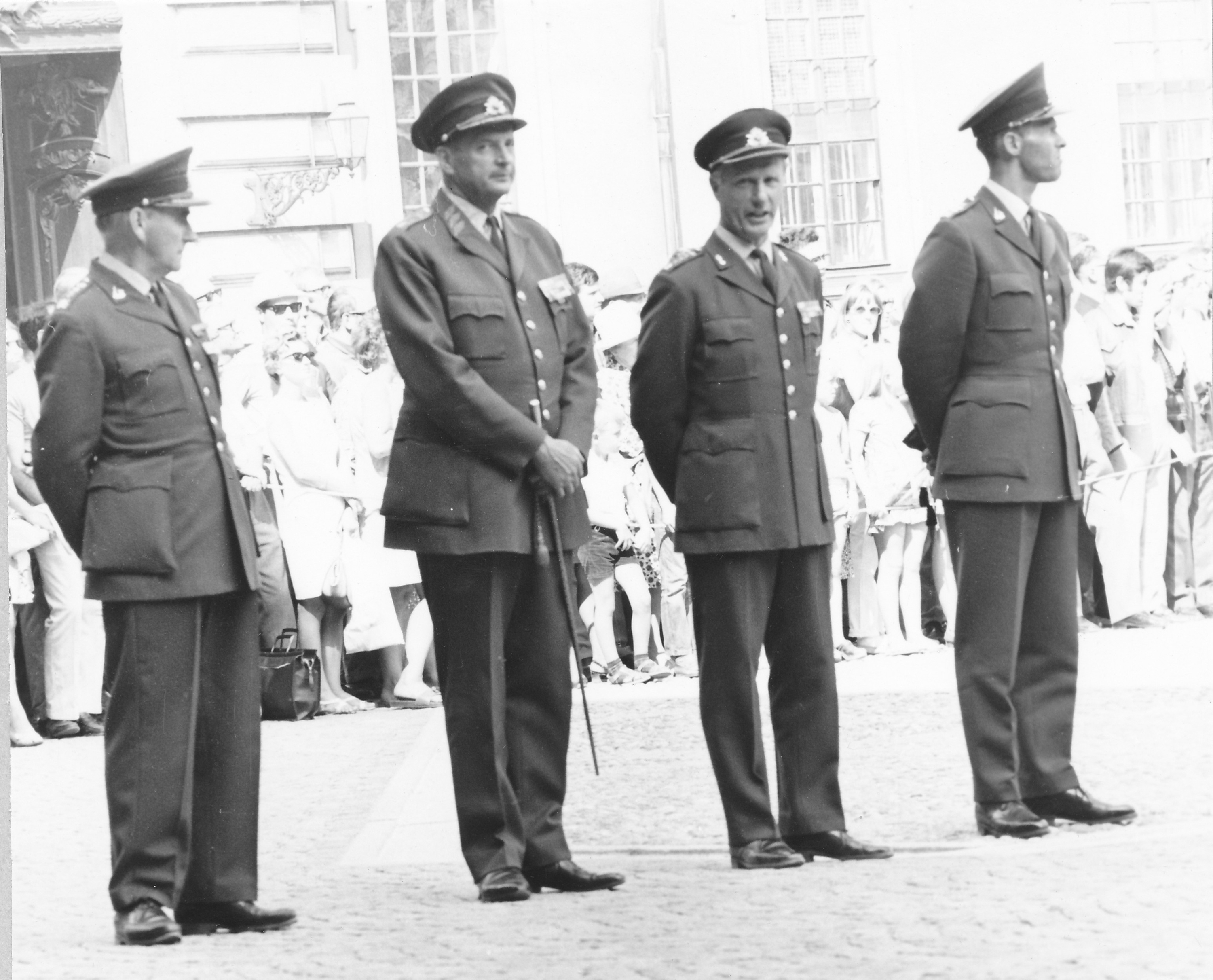
Colonel Nils-Ivar Carlborg (third from the left) as Defence District Commander of Fo 44 and Commandant of Stockholm in 1969.

According to Fo 44's operational order from 1973, with some parts replaced the following year, Fo 44's tasks in war were primarily to protect the national administration and headquarters until they left the district. In order of priority, the main tasks would be to defend Stockholm Palace, the Royal Majesty's Chancery (Kunglig Majestäts kansli), (i.e. the government buildings), the Military Staff Building (Östermalmsgatan 87) which contained the Defence Staff and the Army Staff and the office complex Tre Vapen at Gärdet, which included the Naval Staff and the Air Staff, among others. Air landings in connection with the air bases in Barkarby, Tullinge, Arlanda and Bromma would be averted. The bases and Skarpnäck Airfield would be defended. The most important bridges in Stockholm and across the Södertälje Canal would be defended, which was also the case with three apparently very secret facilities with numerical code designations, furthermore the Nackasändaren and the facilities of the National Defence Radio Establishment at Lovön. A number of other essential sites and facilities for the Swedish Total Defence would also be defended. Furthermore, the Stockholm County Administrative Board, especially in the area of civil defence, would be assisted. Fo 44 would also prepare to stave off advancing forces on the ground towards Stockholm. In connection with the so-called OLLI reform, the Stockholm Defence District was amalgamated with the Life Guard Dragoons (K 1) on 1 July 1975, which was raised to a försvarsområdesregemente ("defence district regiment") the same year and was designated K 1/Fo 44.

The defence district staff was first housed in Bastionen, the military staff building next to the K 1's barracks at Lidingövägen. In 1981 it moved into the so-called Kanslikasernen. The commander of Fo 44's task in 1980, in accordance with what was stated in the military commander's orders, did not differ much from the previous orders. He would protect the national administration and the headquarters until they left the defence district, whereby Stockholm Palace, the Government Offices, the Military Staff Building, the Defence Materiel Administration and the Bastionen staff building would be defended. As a result of the Defence Act of 1982, the authority K 1/Fo 44 was disbanded in 1984. Instead, the authority I 1/Fo 44 was formed located to Svea Life Guard's chancellery building in Kungsängen. Prior to the Defence Act of 2000, the government in its bill to the Riksdag proposed that the tactical level should be reduced by the decommissioning of divisional and defence district staffs as well as naval commands and air commands. This in order to design an army tactical, navy tactical and air tactical command which would be co-located with the operational command. The proposal meant that all defence district staffs would be disbanded, including Stockholm Defence District. Like the other defence districts, Fo 44 was disbanded in 2000.

== Commanding officers ==
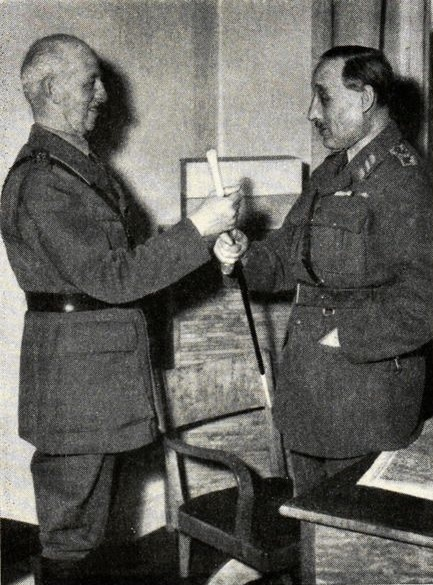
Change of Commandant of Stockholm and Defence District Commander. The departing commandant, Major General Hugo Cederschiöld (right) seen here submitting the commandant baton to his successor in office, Colonel Nils Stenbeck (1 April 1945).

In 1938, the Commandant of Stockholm also became Defence District Commander for Stockholm Defence District (Fo 44). From 1975 to 1984, the Defence District Staff was integrated into the Life Guard Dragoons, and from 1984 to 2000 in the Svea Life Guards. The Defence District Commander was also regimental commander, as well as Commandant of Stockholm.

- 1942–1945: Hugo Cederschiöld (also CO of Norrtälje Defence District from 1 October 1943)
- 1945–1950: Nils Stenbeck (also CO of Norrtälje Defence District (Note: Norrtälje Defence District was amalgamated into Stockholm Defence District in 1946.))
- 1950–1957: Gustaf (Gösta) Magnus von Stedingk
- 1957–1963: Carl Johan Wachtmeister
- 1963–1966: Per Tamm
- 1966–1969: Carl Reuterswärd
- 1969–1973: Nils-Ivar Carlborg
- 1973–1976: Nils Östlund
- 1976–1981: Nils Landergren
- 1981–1984: Hodder Stjernswärd
- 1984–1987: Rolf Frykhammar
- 1987–1992: Jan-Olof Borgén
- 1993–1994: Göran De Geer
- 1994–1997: Markku Sieppi
- 1997–2000: Kim Åkerman

== Names, designations and locations ==
Name	Translation	From		To
Stockholms försvarsområde	Stockholm Defence District	1942-10-01	–	2000-06-30
Designation		From		To
Fo 44		1942-10-01	–	1975-06-30
K 1/Fo 44		1975-07-01	–	1984-09-30
I 1/Fo 44		1984-10-01	–	2000-06-30
Location		From		To
Storgatan 30, Stockholm		1942-09-24	–	1949-11-24
Lidingövägen 28		1949-11-25	–	1957-10-06
Mariaberget, Lundagatan		1957-10-07	–	1971-10-24
Lidingövägen 24		1949-10-01	–	2000-06-30
Kungsängen Garrison		1984-10-01	–	2000-06-30
