= Svea Life Guards =

Swedish Army infantry regiment (1521-2000)

Coordinates: 59°30′56″N 17°46′10″E

- Svea livgarde
- Active: 1521–2000 (Note: Continued as the Life Guards 2000–present.)
- Country: Sweden
- Branch: Swedish Army
- Part of: Middle Military District
- Headquarters: Kungsängen Garrison
- Motto(s): Possunt nec posse videntur ("They do what appears to be impossible") (Note: Svea Life Guards' motto is Possunt nec posse videntur and is translated by the Svea Life Guards to "modern Swedish" as De gör det som syns vara omöjligt ("They do what appears to be impossible"). A more literal translation is De kan, de ser inte bara ut att kunna or De kunna, ehuru de synas icke kunna ("They could, though they seem to not be able"). The motto probably appeared the first time on one of the Life Guard's colours of the 1686 model.)
- Colors: Yellow
- March: "Kungl. Svea Livgardes Marsch" (Note: By W. Körner. The march was adopted in 1834.)
- Battle honours: The Liberation War (1521); Rhine (1631); Lützen (1632); Warsaw (1656); March Across the Belts (1658); Halmstad (1676); Lund (1676); Landskrona (1677); Narva (1700); Düna (1701); Kliszów (1702); Holowczyn (1708); Svensksund (1790)

The Svea Life Guards (Swedish: Svea livgarde), also I 1, was a Swedish Army infantry regiment that was active in various forms 1521–2000. The unit was based in the Stockholm Garrison in Stockholm and belonged to the King's Life and Household Troops (Kungl. Maj:ts Liv- och Hustrupper) until 1974.

== History ==
=== 1500s–1900s ===
Svea Life Guards, the Swedish Army's first guard infantry regiment, originated from the Trabant Corps that surrounded the first Vasa Kings and is said to have been formed in 1526. The Trabant Corps seems to have, at least in part, been included in the enlisted regiment established in 1613, which consisted mostly of Germans, which under the names of the King's Life and Court Regiment (Konungens liv- och hovregemente), the Yellow Regiment (Gula regementet) and the Yellow Brigade (Gula brigaden) participated in Gustavus Adolphus' campaign in Germany. The regiment's first two companies formed the king's lifeguard and consisted mostly of Swedes. The 60 survivors of the guard after the Battle of Lützen, followed the king's corpse to Sweden, after which the guard, whose staff has been increased to 148 men, united in 1644 with one established regiment in the Baltic governorates and one established regiment in Svealand into a large court regiment of which Magnus Gabriel De la Gardie was the commander.

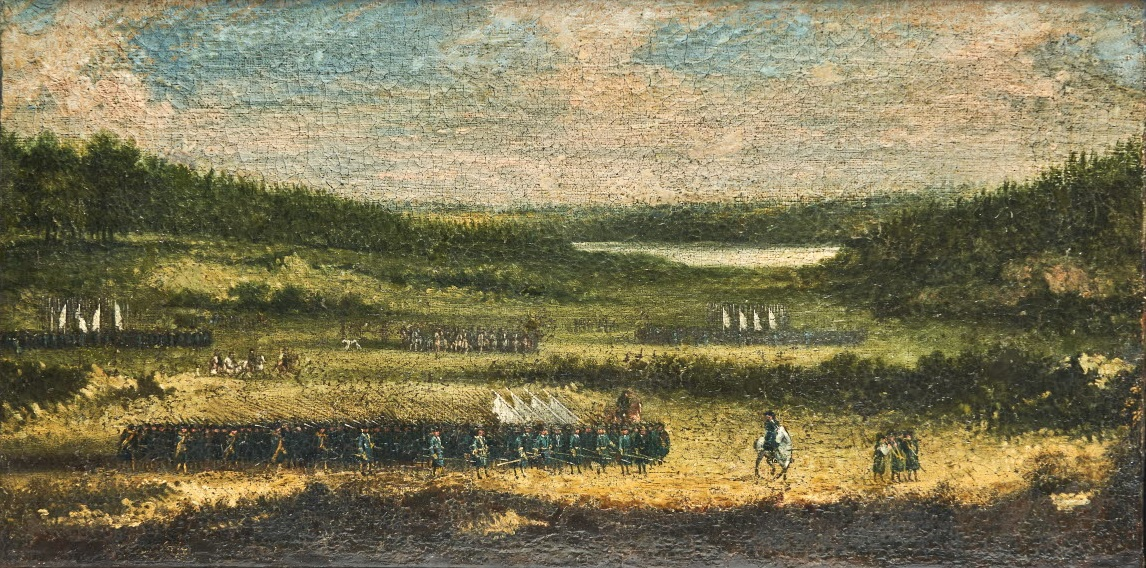
Charles XI exercising the Life Guards of Foot at Gärdet in 1691

Most of the regiment was disbanded after 1660, but the part still in Sweden was developed into a Guard or Court Regiment. Eventually increased to 24 companies, it participated in Charles XII's War and was lost after the Battle of Poltava, but was then reestablished. The Life Guards as the regiment then was commonly known, was given the name Svea Guards (Svea garde) in 1792. The regiment had its barracks at Fredrikshov Castle in Östermalm, Stockholm from 1802. In 1808 it lost for a short time its dignity of being a guard and was then called Fleetwood's Enlisted Regiment (Fleetwoodska värvade regementet). It was in 1809 again called Svea Guards (Svea garde) and received the name Svea Life Guards (Svea livgarde) the same year. From having been divided into 10 companies of 80 men, the regiment was in 1831 divides into eight companies with a total of 820 men. After the Defence Act of 1901, it increased into 12 companies (three battalions) and 1 machine gun company, but its number strength of volunteers was reduced to 555 men (music staff included) and after the Defence Act of 1914 further to 540 men.

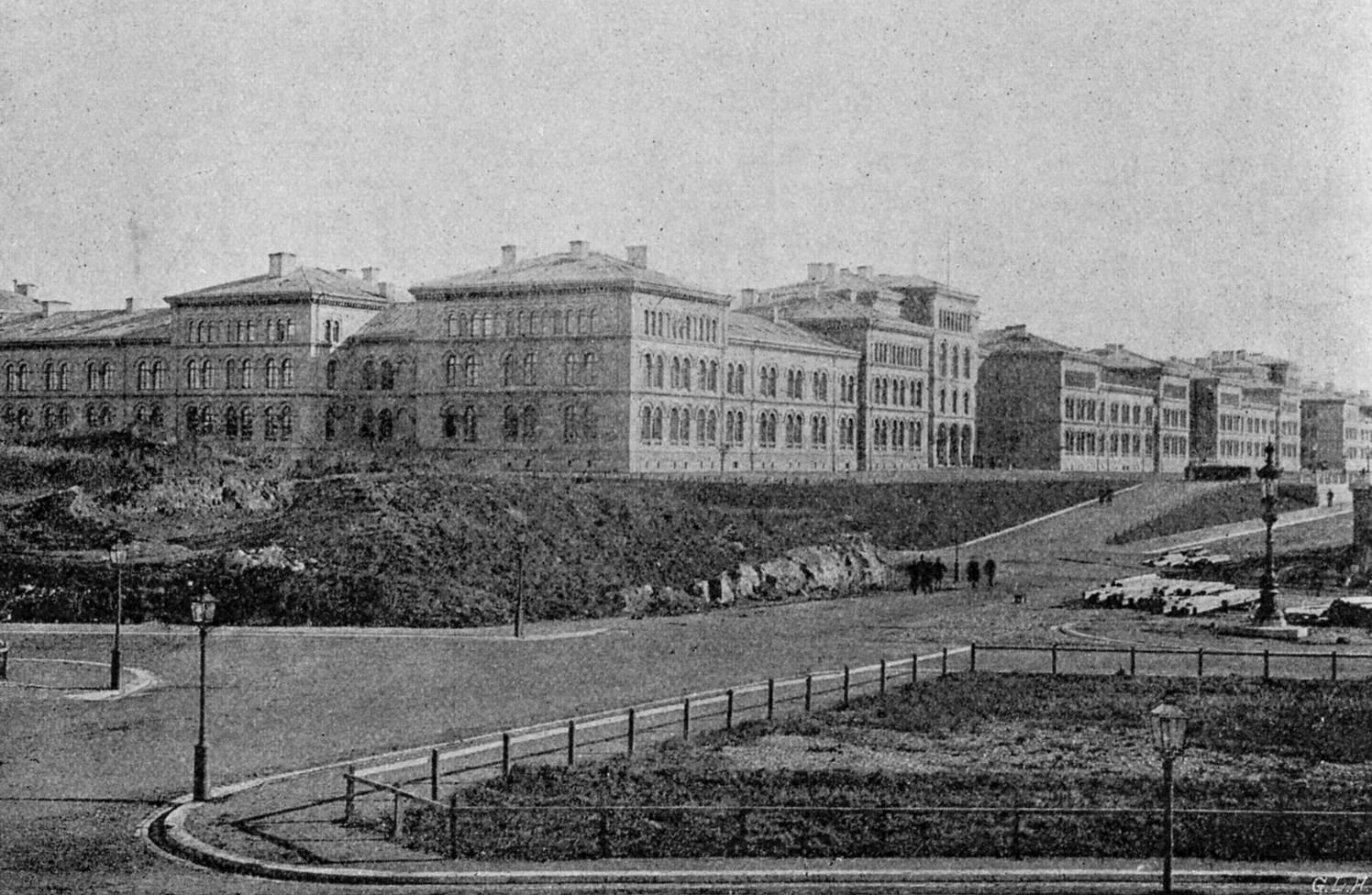
The barracks of Svea Life Guards and Göta Life Guards at Linnégatan, Stockholm, circa 1890.

Svea Life Guards was an enlisted regiment and its staff, which was stationed in the barracks at Fredrikshov, was permanently employed. In the early 1800s compulsory military service in Sweden was introduced on a modest scale. As a result of the increased multiform unrest in Europe during the 1850s, it increased the conscripts appropriated exercise period from 12 to 30 days, spread over the first two years of conscript military service. These exercises took place during the summer. However, when the space in the barracks was too small to accommodate these conscripts, they were placed in bivouac shelters at Ladugårdsgärdet. The cramped space at Fredrikshov and the unhygienic conditions there and the ever-increasing need to place conscripts in barracks, forced the decision on the construction of modern barracks for the two foot guards regiments, Svea Life Guards and Göta Life Guards. It was decided that the plateau above Fredrikshov, was the most well-situated location for the barracks, adjacent to the large practice field, which northern Djurgården then still was. Palace intendant, Professor Ernst Jacobsson, was instructed to carry out the drawings and in the autumn of 1888 Svea Life Guards could during great celebrations, led by their head, King Oscar II, take possession of their new barracks.

=== 1900s–2000s ===
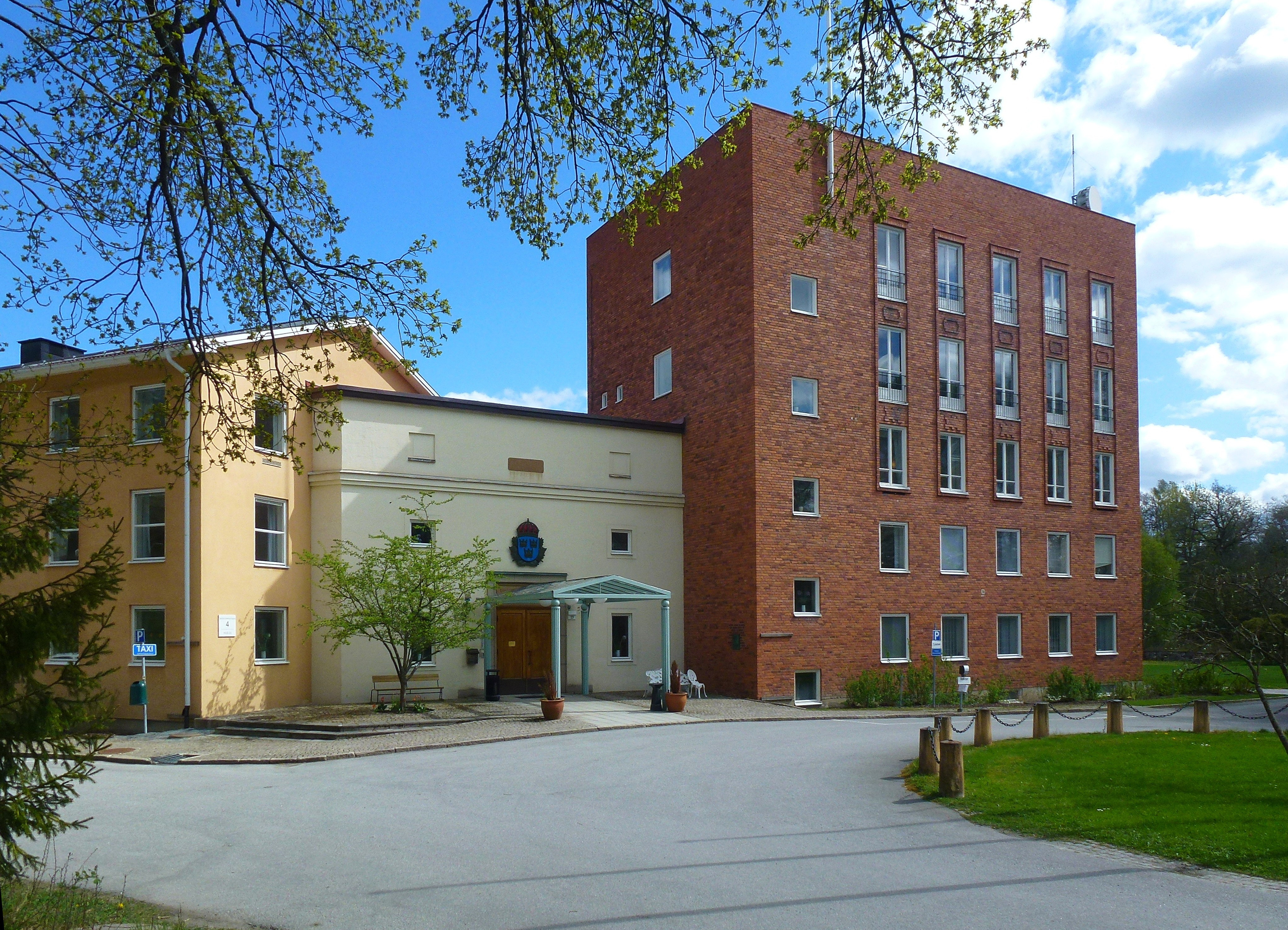
Administration building in Sörentorp, Solna. Today part of the Swedish National Police Academy.

In the early 1940s the planned relocation of the regiment to Järvafältet became reality after the decision was ratified several decades previous. On 5 October 1946 the Svea Life Guards officially left their barracks at Linnégatan in Östermalm, Stockholm and this took place at a ceremony in a nearby park close to a memorial stone. The executive officer at the time, colonel Gösta von Stedingk, handed the memorial stone over to the City of Stockholm, represented by the municipal commissioner of the Stockholm Central Board of Administration (Stadskollegium), Yngve Larsson. The regiment then left Stockholm which had been its home for more than 400 years. The regiment moved again in 1947 to Sörentorp in Solna. The design of the place they were to occupy was carried out by the Royal Fortifications Administration, the area was given a relatively free pooled plan, and Bertil Karlén was the architect of the buildings. In 1970 Svea Life Guards moved once more, this time to a zone at Granhammar Castle in Kungsängen.

From 1975 to 1984, the regiment's duties were to maintain a number of military units in the war organization and conduct war planning for these. The regiment was also responsible for Kungsängen's barracks area with associated exercise and firing range as well as to lend some support to other units in the garrison. Included in the maintenance of war units was the recruitment of officers, but also internal officer training and education of conscripts. Officer training was also carried out for other regiments to maintain the war units. The regimental staff and training units participated extensively in state ceremonial activities on behalf of the Commandant General in Stockholm and the Commandant of Stockholm. The regiment consisted mainly of a staff unit, a training unit (including a training battalion and department for management of exercises), a firing range and a support unit with subdivisions. The Swedish Armed Forces ABC-Defence School was located in Kungsängen and was included as a section of the unit.

On 1 October 1984 the Life Guard Dragoons with Stockholm Defence District (K 1/Fo 44) was disbanded, and Svea Life Guards was renamed Svea Life Guards with Stockholm Defence District (I 1/Fo 44). The regiment took over the task as lower regional head of the Stockholm Defence District as well as the maintenance of cavalry troops in war organization. The regimental commander became the Commandant of Stockholm. The regiment consisted of a staff unit, a unit of territorial management, a training unit (including two training battalions) and one support unit with subdivisions. The duties of the regimental commander as the Commandant of Stockholm, notably to state ceremonial activities, were coordinated by a garrison unit located at the Stockholm Palace in Stockholm. On 1 July 1994 the Life Guard Dragoons were separated and again became an independent unit. The unit was disbanded in 2000 as a result of the disarmament policies set forward in that year's Defence Act of 2000, and then re-emerged the same year as the Life Guards (LG).

== Units ==
The regiment came through the Defence Act of 1942 to organize two field regiments, the Svea Life Guards (IR 1) and the Stockholm Infantry Regiment (IR 31). Through the Defence Act of 1948, the field regiments were reorganized into infantry brigades. In Svea Life Guards only the field regiment Svea Life Guards was reorganized into a brigade, and Stockholm Infantry Regiment was divided between the Blue Brigade (PB 6) and the Södermanland Brigade (PB 10).

=== Yellow Brigade ===
The Yellow Brigade (Gula brigaden, IB 1) was raised in 1949 by reorganizing the field regiment Svea Life Guards (IR 1) into a brigade. The brigade initially became Svea Life Guard's only brigade. Through the Defence Act of 1982, the Riksdag decided that the army's brigade organization would be reduced, thus the Yellow Brigade would be disbanded on 30 September 1984. However, the name came to be taken over by the sister brigade, the Uppland Brigade.

=== Life Guard Brigade ===
The Life Guard Brigade (Livgardesbrigaden, MekIB 1 ), originally Uppland Brigade (Upplandsbrigaden, IB 38), was raised in 1957 through the Defence Act of 1958. The background was that it was transferred from the Uppland Regiment (I 8), which was disbanded by the same Defence Act. Through the Defence Act of 1972, the brigade came to become Svea Life Guards' attack brigade, when it was adopted into the IB 77 brigade organization. On 1 October 1984, the brigade adopted the name Yellow Brigade (Gula brigaden, IB 1). In the early 1990s, the brigade was one of the experimental brigades for the IB 2000 brigade organization. In 1991, the name was changed to the Life Guard Brigade (Livgardesbrigaden, IB 1). On 1 July 1994, the Yellow Brigade (IB 1) was separated from the regiment, and became a cadre-organized war unit within the Middle Military District (Milo M), under the name Life Guard Brigade (MekIB 1). The brigade was disbanded on 30 June 2000 in connection with the Defence Act of 2000.

=== Life Guard Dragoons ===
The Life Guard Dragoons (K 1) was amalgamated into Svea Life Guards on 1 October 1984 . Through this organizational change, Svea Life Guards also took over the defence district staff for Stockholm Defence District (Fo 44) from the Life Guard Dragoons (K 1). On 1 July 1994, the Life Guard Dragoons were separated and again became an independent unit.

=== Stockholm Defence District ===
The Stockholm Defence District (Fo 44) was raised on 1 October 1942, and had its staff located in Stockholm Garrison. On 1 January 1947, parts of Norrtälje Defence District (Fo 45) were amalgamated into the defence district. On 1 July 1975, Vaxholm Defence District (Fo 46) was added, which meant that Stockholm Defence District covered the entire Stockholm County. In connection with the OLLI reform on 1 July 1975, the Stockholm Defence District was given joint staff with the Life Guard Dragoons (K 1). Through this reorganization, the defence district staff was located with the regiment at Lidingövägen. Through the Defence Act of 1982, the defence district staff was transferred to the Svea Life Guards, both organizationally and that it was located at Kungsängen with the other regiment staff. Stockholm Defence District was disbanded together with the regiment on 30 June 2000.

=== Companies ===
1. Life Company
2. (Vacant)
3. Company
4. Company
5. Company
6. Company
7. Company
8. Company
9. (Vacant)
10. (Vacant)
11. Company
12. Company

== Heraldry and traditions ==
=== Colours, standards and guidons ===
The Life Guards present one regimental colour, one regimental standard and one company colour:

==== Colour of the Life Guards ====
The 1964 colour, which had been presented at the Stockholm Palace by His Majesty the King Gustaf VI Adolf. This colour was from 1 July 1994 been carried by both the Svea Life Guards and the Life Guards Brigade. A new colour was presented to the Svea Life Guards and the Life Guards Brigade on 30 April 2000 by His Majesty the King Carl XVI Gustaf at the Stockholm Palace in connection with his birthday. It was used by the two units until the amalgamation with the Life Guard Dragoons (K 1) on 1 July 2000. The colour is also carried by the Guards Battalion of the Life Guards. The colour is drawn by Bengt Olof Kälde and embroidered by hand in insertion technique by Maj-Britt Salander/company Blå Kusten. Blazon: "On white cloth in the centre the greater coat of arms of Sweden as to the law without mantle. In each corner a royal crown proper with red lining. Battle honours (The Liberation War 1521, Rhine 1631, Lützen 1632, Warsaw 1656, March Across the Belts 1658, Halmstad 1676, Lund 1676, Landskrona 1677, Narva 1700, Düna 1701, Kliszów 1702, Holowczyn 1708, Svensksund 1790) in yellow horizontally placed above and below the coat of arms."

==== Standard of the Life Guards ====
The standard is drawn by Bengt Olof Kälde and embroidered by hand in insertion technique by Maj-Britt Salander/company Blå Kusten. The standard was presented to the then Life Guard Dragoons (K 1) at the regimental barracks in Stockholm by His Majesty the King Carl XVI Gustaf on 4 December 1995 - the regimental memorial day of the battle of Lund in 1676. It was used by the regiment until the amalgamation with the Svea Life Guards on 1 July 2000. The standard is also carried by the Dragoon Battalion (Livgardets dragonbataljon) of the Life Guards. Blazon: "On white cloth in the centre the Swedish Royal coat-of-arms as to the law without mantle. In each corner a royal crown proper with red lining. On the reverse battle honours horizontally placed and in each corner three open crowns placed two and one (a legacy from the former Royal Life Regiment Dragoons, K 2), all yellow. White fringe."

==== Colour of the Life Company ====
The colour of the Svea Life Guards' Life company was presented in 1868 by Her Majesty the Queen Lovisa who also embroidered it by hand together with her ladies-in-waiting. Blazon: "On white cloth in the centre the Royal monogram of His Majesty the King Carl XV between three open crowns, all yellow and with red lining in the crowns. Fringe of golden threads."

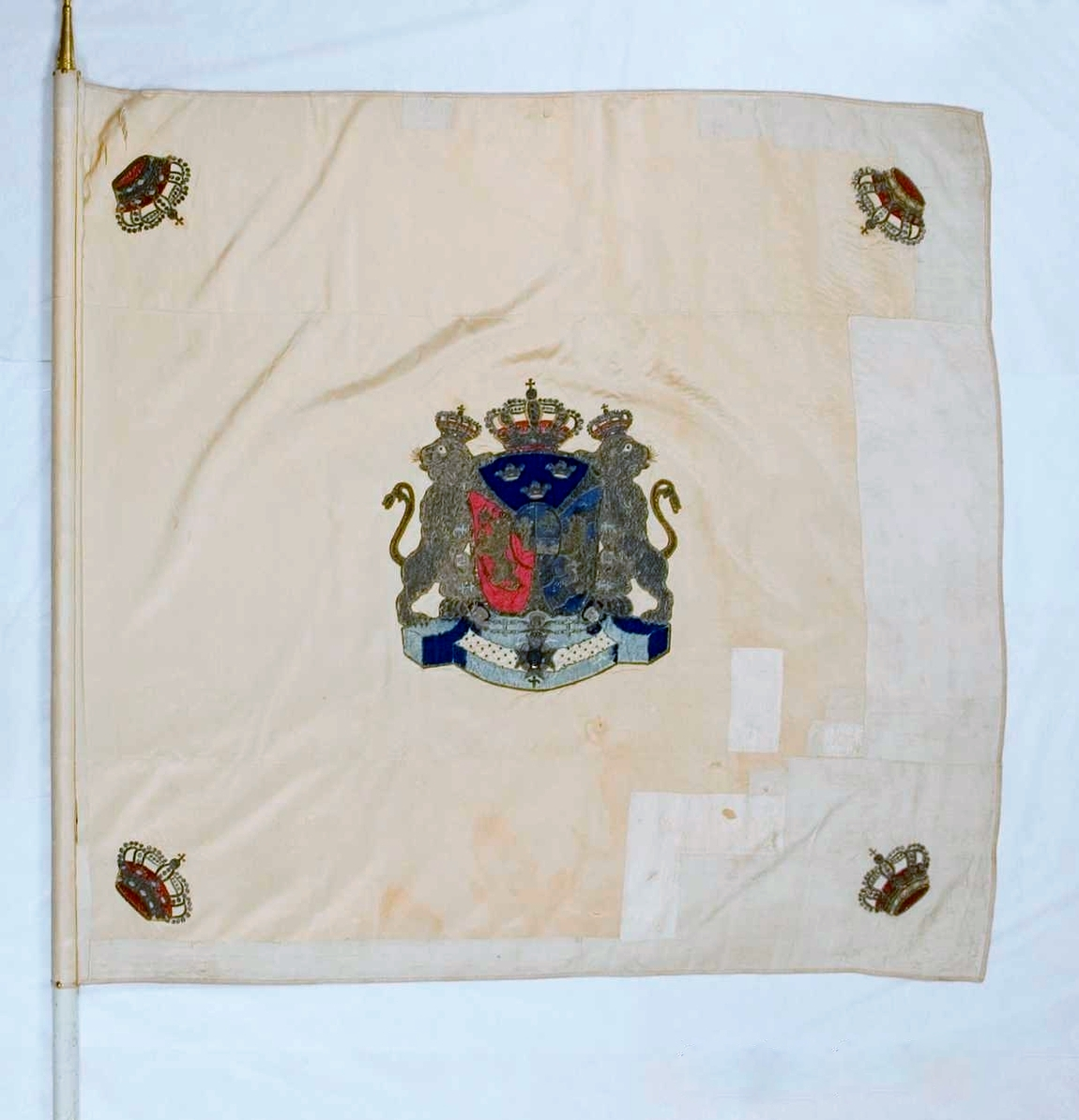
Life colour m/1815 of Svea Life Guards.

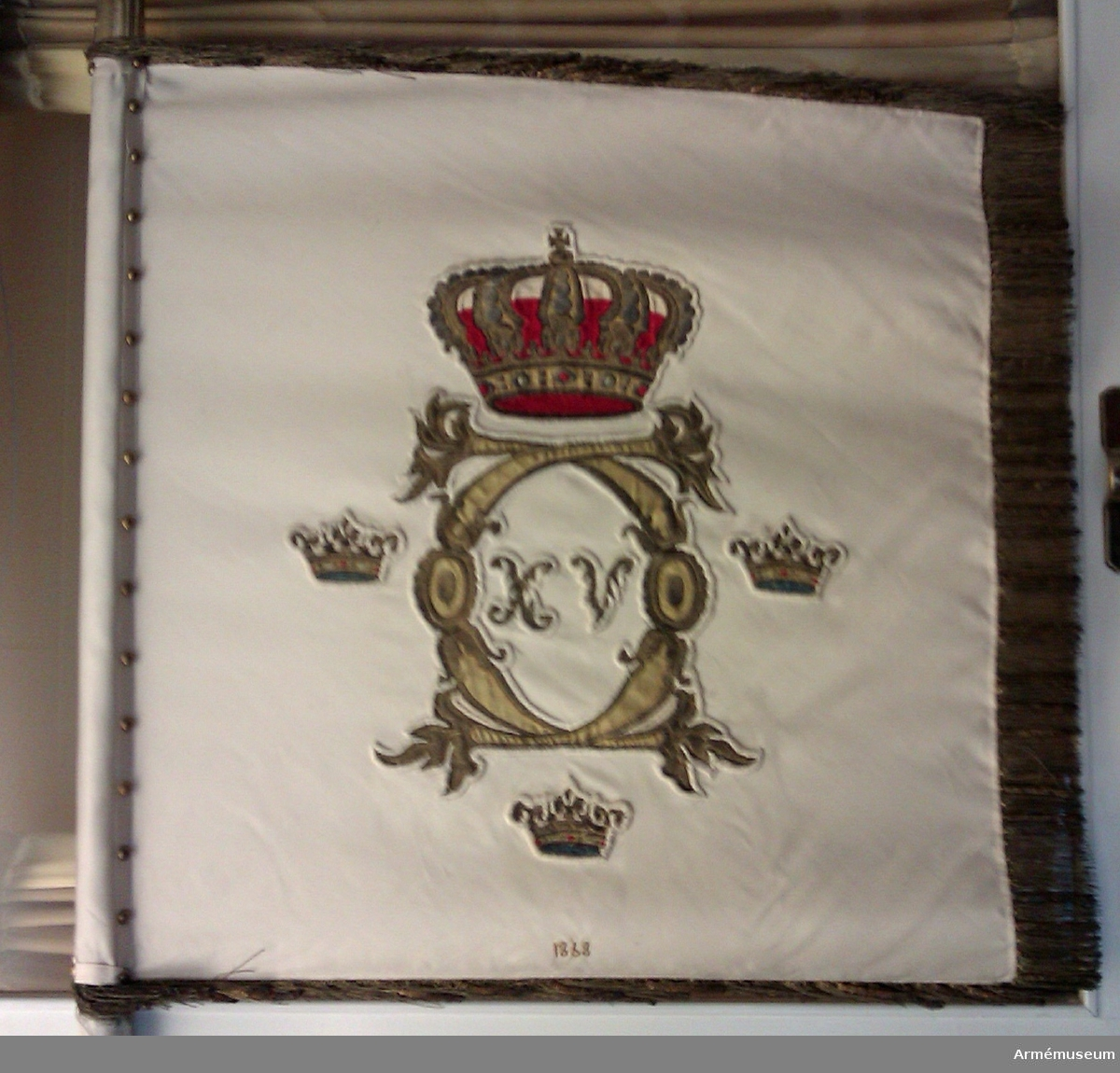
Colour m/1868 of Svea Life Guards' Life company.

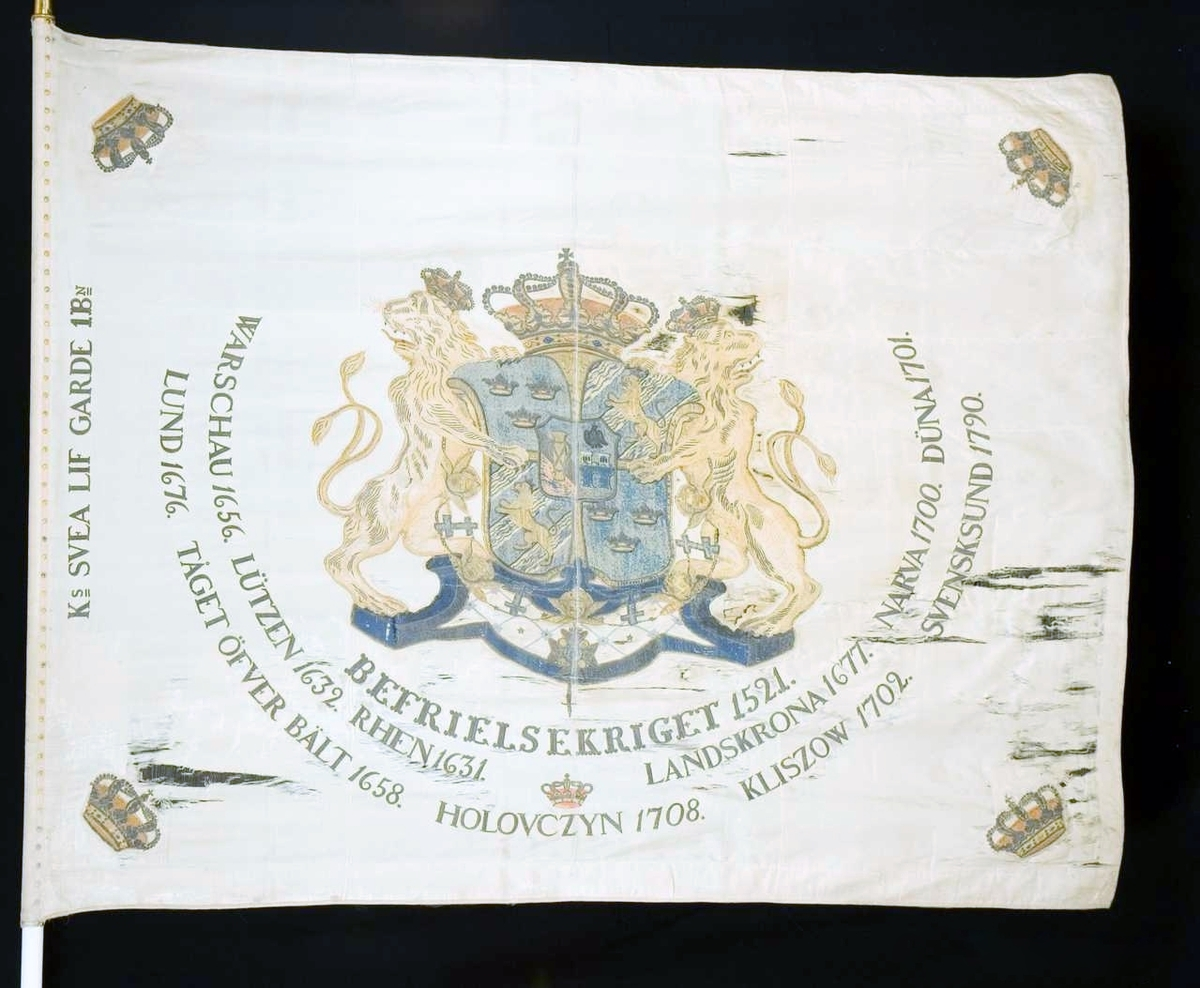
Battalion colour m/1850 of 1st Battalion, Svea Life Guards.

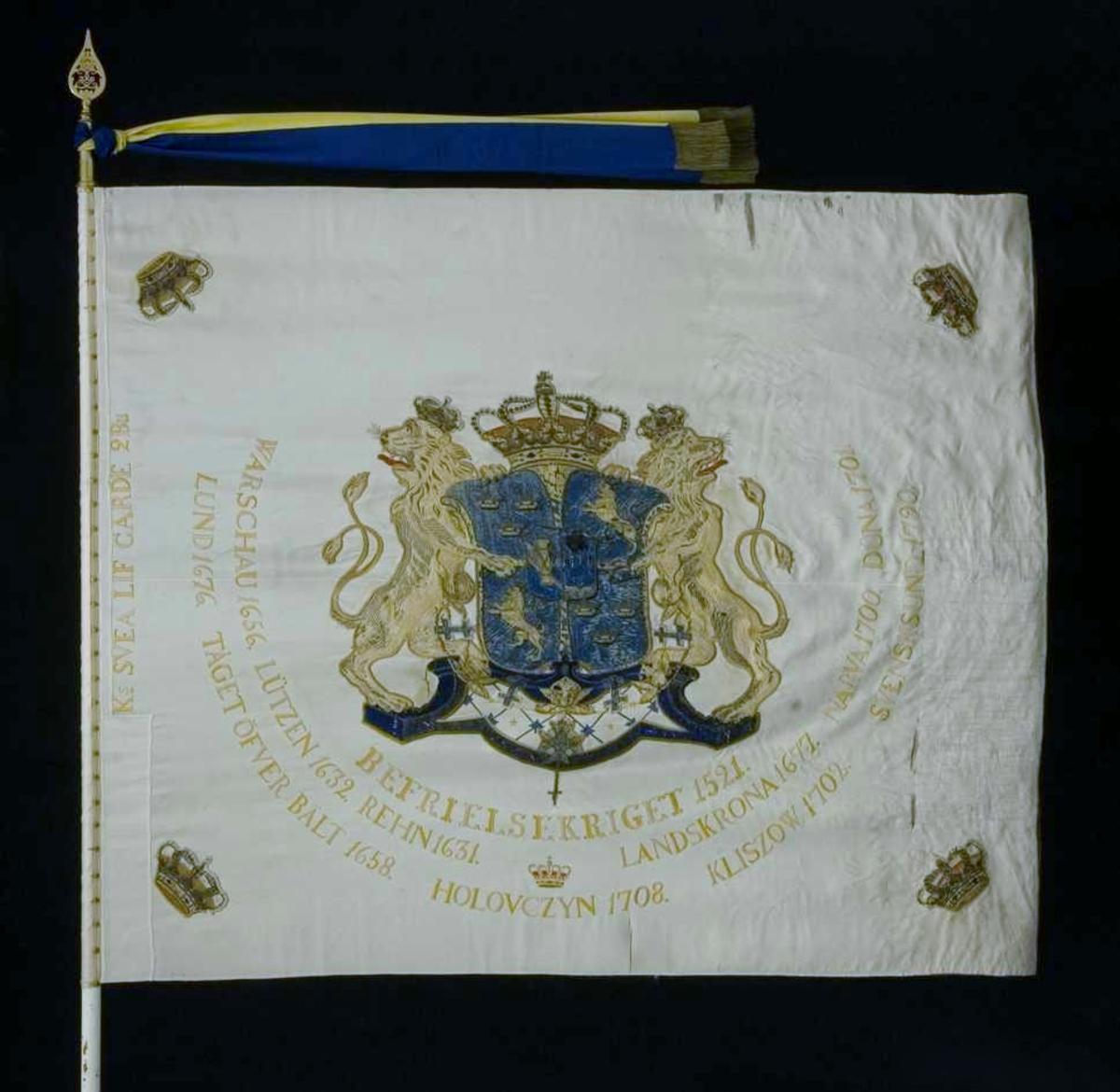
Battalion colour m/1850 of 2nd Battalion, Svea Life Guards.

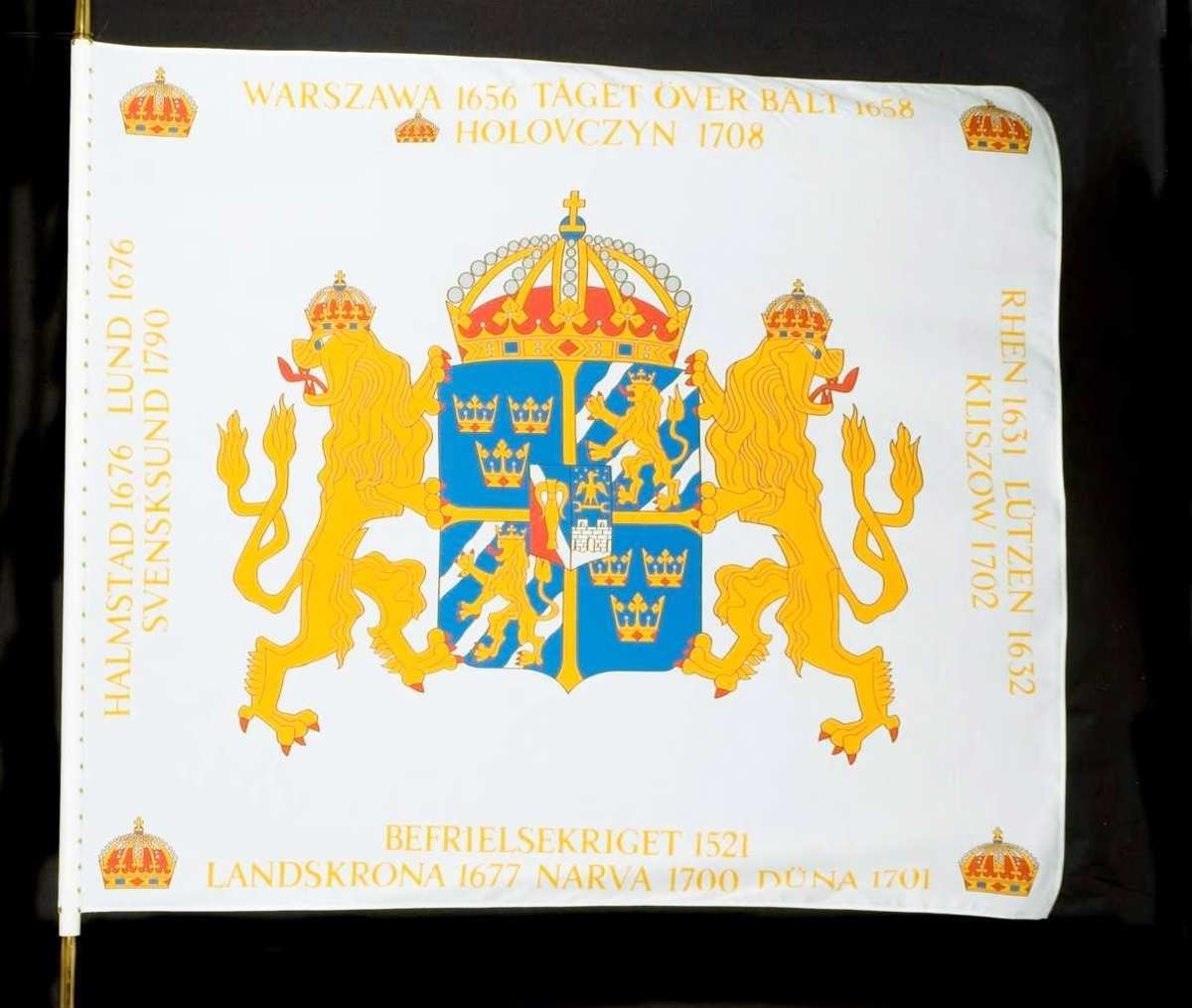
Guards colour of Svea Life Guards.

=== Coat of arms ===
The coat of the arms of the Svea Life Guards (I 1) 1977–1984, the Svea Life Guards (I 1/Fo 44) 1984–1994 and the Life Guard Brigade (IB 1) 1994–2000. Blazon: "Azure, the lesser coat of arms of Sweden, three open crowns or placed two and one. The shield surmounted two muskets in saltire argent and surrounded by the chain of the Royal Order of the Seraphim placed under muskets and crown". Another coat of arms was used by Svea Life Guards (I 1/Fo 44) 1994–2000 and has been used by the Life Guard Group (Livgardesgruppen) since 2000. Blazon: "Azure, lesser coat of arms of Sweden, three open crowns or placed two and one. The shield surmounted two swords in saltire argent and is surrounded by the chain of the Royal Order of the Seraphim placed under swords and crown".

Coat of the arms of the Svea Life Guards (I 1) 1977–1984, the Svea Life Guards (I 1/Fo 44) 1984–1994 and the Life Guard Brigade (IB 1) 1994–2000.

Coat of arms of the Svea Life Guards (I 1/Fo 44) 1994–2000 and the Life Guard Group (Livgardesgruppen) 2000–present.

=== Insignias ===
Unlike the other infantry and armor regiments, which have a constant unit insignia, the Svea Life Guards has the Swedish monarch's monogram.

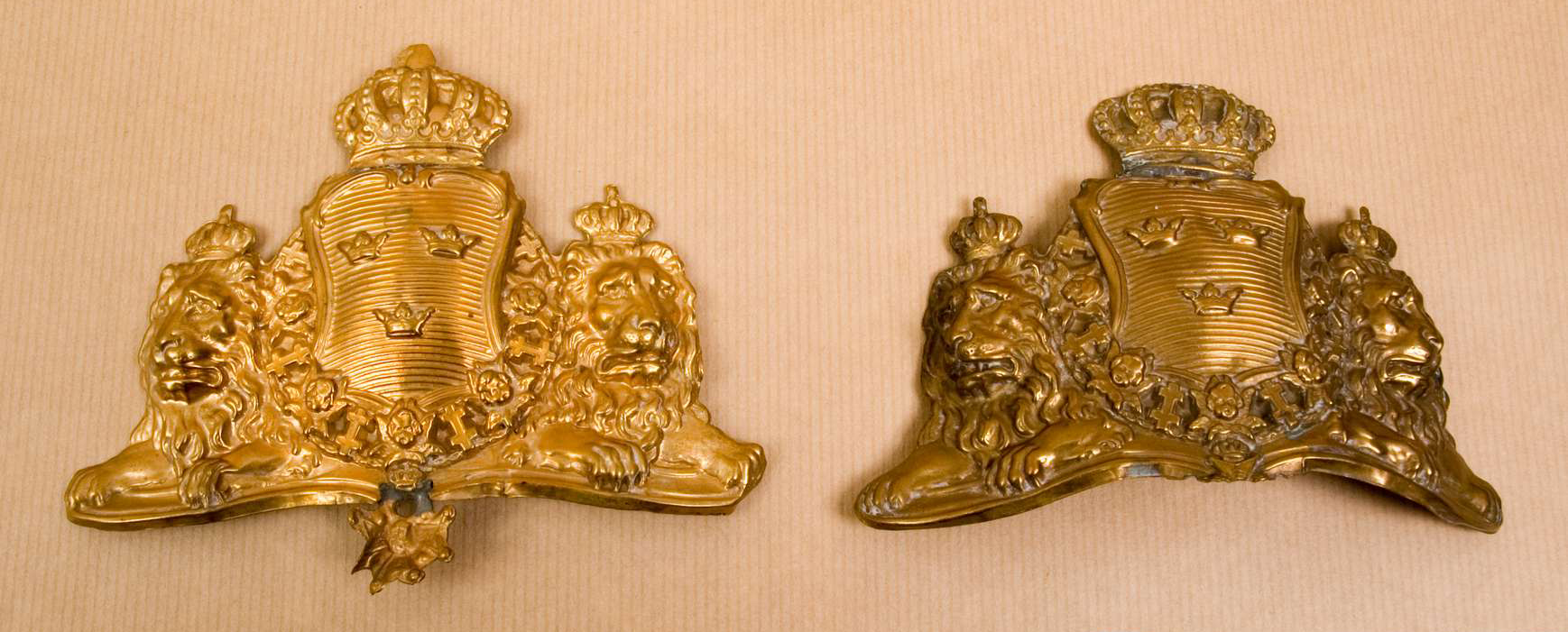
Cap badge m/1878 for kepi. Soldiers = brass, N.C.O's = gilt.

Unit insignia M7675-138000 m/1950-60 for Svea Life Guards (I 1).

Unit insignia M7675-138000 m/1950-60 for Svea Life Guards (I 1).

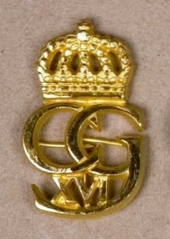
Unit insignia m/1960.

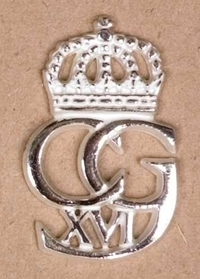
Unit insignia m/1960.

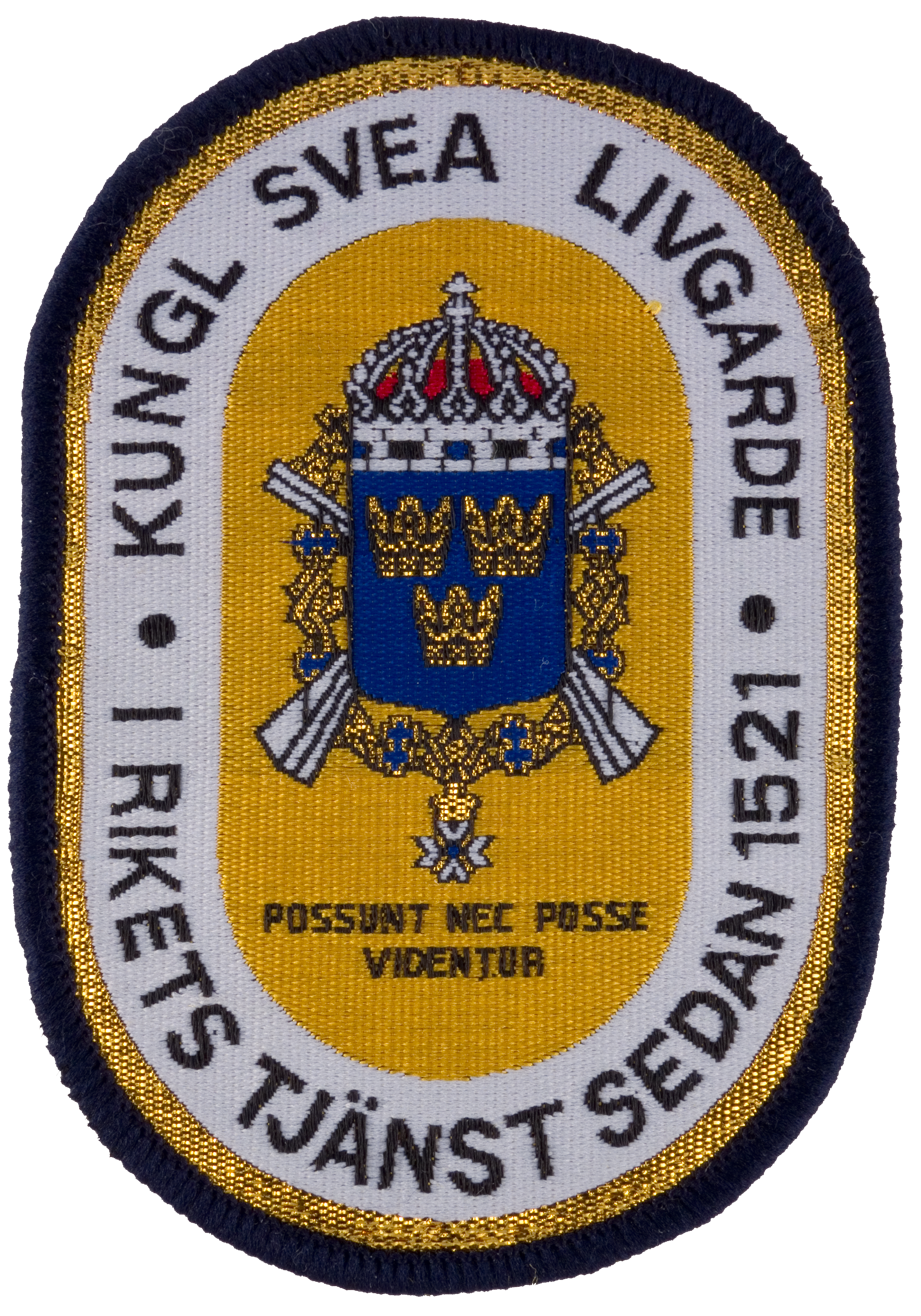
Shoulder sleeve insignia.

=== Medals ===
In 1921, the Kungliga Svea livgardes 400-åriga jubileumsmedalj i silver ("Royal Svea Life Guards 400-year Anniversary Medal") in silver (SLMSM) was established. This medal was established as a commemorative medal when the regiment was disbanded on 30 June 2000.

In 1999, the Svea livgardes (I 1) och Livgardesbrigadens (IB 1) förtjänstmedalj ("Svea Life Guards (I 1) and Life Guard Brigade (IB 1) Medal of Merit") in gold and silver (SvealivgLivgbrigGM/SM) was established. The medal ribbon is of yellow moiré with a white stripe on each side both followed on both sides by a blue line. His Majesty the King's monogram is attached to the ribbon. In 2000, when Svea Life Guards was disbanded and the Life Guards was raised, this medal was renamed Livgardets (LG) förtjänstmedalj ("Life Guards (LG) Medal of Merit I") (LGIGM/SM).

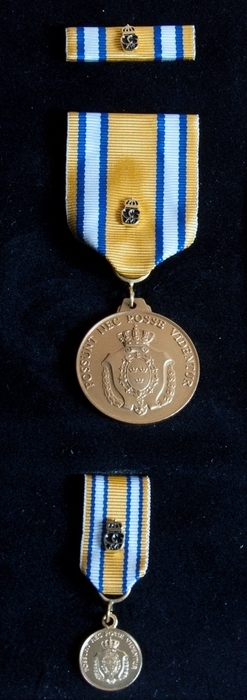
Svea Life Guards and the Life Guards Brigade Medal of Merit in gold

Svea Life Guards and the Life Guards Brigade Medal of Merit

== Commanding officers ==
Regimental commanders and executive officers (Sekundchef) active at the regiment. On 11 March 1774, King Gustav III himself took over as commanding officer of the regiment, but left the actual command of it to the executive officer. This was subsequently done to all units within the King's Life and Household Troops (Kungl. Maj:ts Liv- och Hustrupper) which until 1974 had each an executive officer and the king as joint commander. Sekundchef was a title which was used until 31 December 1974 at the regiments that were part of the King's Life and Household Troops.

=== Commanding officers (1657–1774) ===
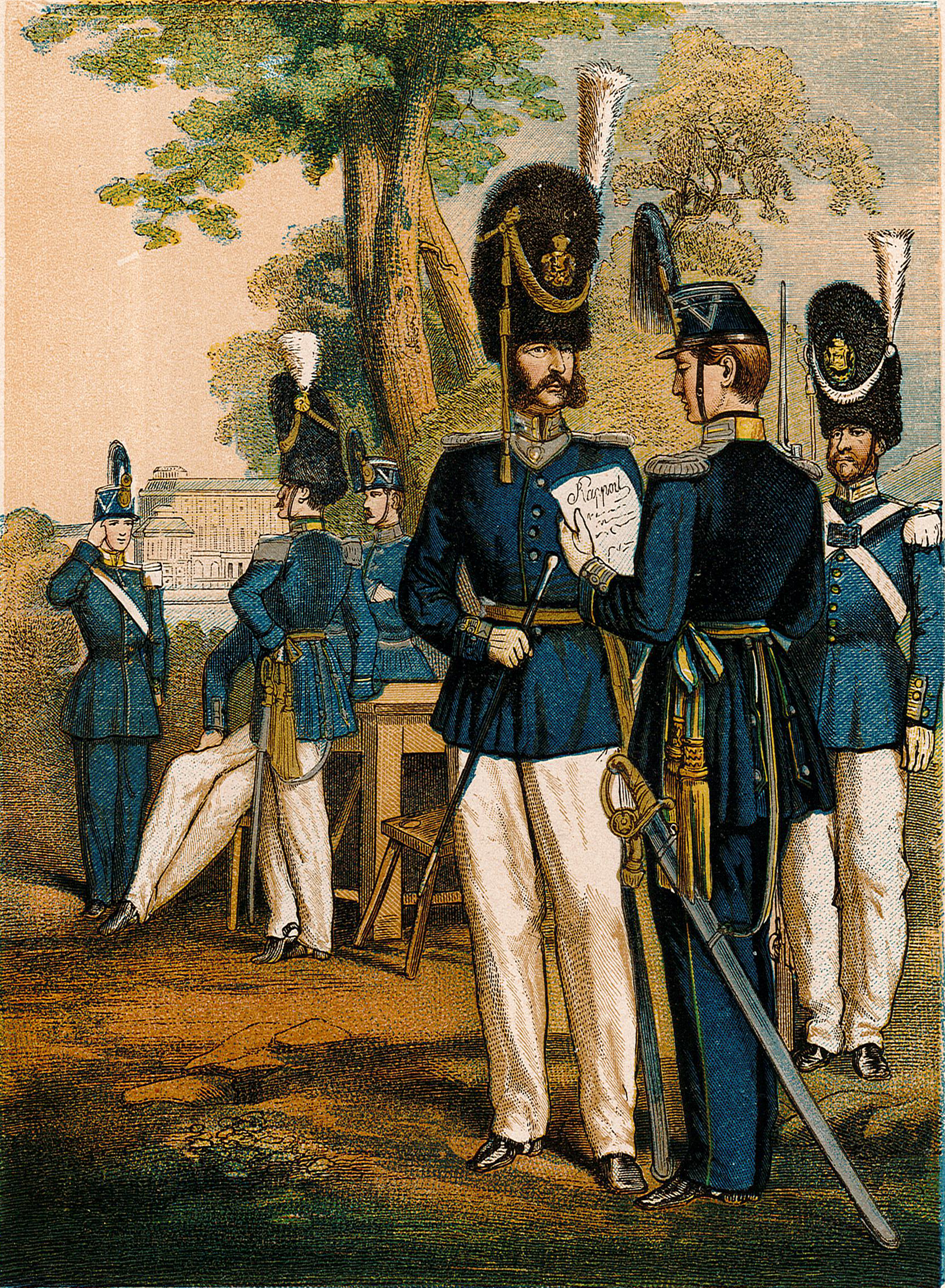
Uniforms of the Svea Life Guards.

- 1696–1706: Knut Posse
- 1706–1712: Carl Magnus Posse
- 1712–1712: Jakob Grundel
- 1712–1717: Gabriel Ribbing
- 1717–1727: Michael Törnflycht
- 1727–1739: Arvid Posse
- 1739–1744: Otto Wrangel
- 1744–1751: Adolf Frederick
- 1751–1756: Per Gustaf Pfeiff
- 1756–1772: Axel von Fersen
- 1772–1772: Carl Ehrenkrook (acting)
- 1772–1774: Jacob Magnus Sprengtporten

=== Executive officers (1774–1974) ===
- 1774–1774: Carl Ehrenkrook (acting)
- 1774–1776: Jakob Leonard König
- 1776–1788: Carl Aminoff
- 1788–1796: Bror Cederström
- 1796–1796: Fabian von Fersen
- 1796–1797: Wilhelm Bennet
- 1797–1802: Adolf von Friesendorff
- 1802–1808: Carl Carlsson Mörner
- 1808–1809: Carl Johan Fleetwood (regimental commander) (Note: Carl Johan Fleetwood was the regimental commander from 12 October 1808 to 9 April 1809 because the regiment was deprived of the rank of a guard regiment.)
- 1809–1811: Carl Carlsson Mörner
- 1811–1815: Johan August Sandels
- 1815–1837: Carl Lovisin
- 1837–1843: Sixten Sparre
- 1843–1849: Adolf Axel Lovisin
- 1849–1853: Nils Gyldenstolpe
- 1853–1862: Carl Henric Möllerswärd
- 1862–1873: Gösta Leijonhufvud
- 1873–1887: Roger Björnstjerna
- 1888–1892: Henric Ankarcrona
- 1892–1896: Major general Hemming Gadd
- 1896–1897: Carl Lagercrantz
- 1897–1902: Gustaf Uggla
- 1902–1909: Carl Rosenblad
- 1909–1915: Hugo Hult
- 1915–1920: John Montgomery
- 1920–1923: Ernst Silfverswärd
- 1923–1928: Colonel Oscar Nygren
- 1928–1936: Carl Tersmeden
- 1936–1938: Major general (Note: Took office as colonel in 1936 and was promoted to major general in the army in 1937 while still in office.) Hugo Cederschiöld
- 1938–1942: Colonel Henry Tottie
- 1941–1942: Einar Björk (acting)
- 1942–1943: Einar Björk
- 1943–1946: Sven Ramström
- 1946–1950: Gösta von Stedingk
- 1950–1953: Colonel Thord Bonde
- 1953–1957: Colonel Malcolm Murray
- 1957–1965: Sten Langéen
- 1965–1966: Colonel Fredrik Löwenhielm
- 1966–1972: Sten Ljungqvist
- 1972–1974: Bengt Hallenberg
- 1974–1974: Colonel Bengt Selander

=== Commanding officers (1975–2000) ===
- 1975–1980: Colonel Bengt Selander
- 1980–1987: Colonel Rolf Frykhammar
- 1987–1992: Jan-Olof Borgén
- 1992–1994: Göran De Geer
- 1994–1997: Markku Sieppi
- 1997–2000: Kim Åkerman

== Names, designations and locations ==
Name	Translation	From		To
Kungl. Drabanterna	Royal Trabants	1523-??-??	–	1618-??-??
Kungl. Hovregementet	Royal Court Regiment	1618-??-??	–	1649-??-??
Kungl. Maj:ts garde och livregemente	Royal Majesty Guards and Life Regiment	1649-??-??	–	1655-??-??
Kungl. Maj:ts livgarde till häst och fot	Royal Majesty Life Guards of Horse and Foot	1655-??-??	–	1675-??-??
Kungl. Maj:ts livgarde till häst och fot	Royal Majesty Life Guards of Horse and Foot	1675-??-??	–	1700-??-??
Kungl. Maj:ts livgarde till fot	Royal Majesty Life Guards of Foot	1700-??-??	–	1709-07-01
Kungl. Maj:ts livgarde till fot	Royal Majesty Life Guards of Foot	1709-??-??	–	1792-??-??
Kungl. Maj:ts första livgarde	Royal Majesty First Life Guards	1791-??-??	–	1792-08-09
Kungl. Svea livgarde	Royal Svea Life Guards	1792-08-10	–	1806-06-14
Kungl. Livgardet till fots	Royal Life Guards of Foot	1806-06-15	–	1808-10-12
Kungl. Fleetwoodska regementet	Royal Fleetwood Regiment	1808-10-13	–	1809-03-12
Kungl. Svea livgarde	Royal Svea Life Guards	1809-03-13	–	1974-12-31
Svea livgarde	Svea Life Guards	1975-01-01	–	1984-09-30
Svea livgarde med Stockholms försvarsområde	Svea Life Guards and Stockholm Defence District	1984-10-01	–	2000-06-30
Designation		From		To
№ 1		1816-10-01	–	1914-09-30
I 1		1914-10-01	–	1984-09-30
I 1/Fo 44		1984-10-01	–	2000-06-30
Location		From		To
Stockholm/Fredrikshov Castle		1803-10-01	–	1888-10-30
Stockholm/Garnisonen		1888-10-31	–	1946-09-30
Solna/Sörentorp		1946-04-04	–	1970-06-30
Kungsängen Garrison		1970-07-01	–	2000-06-30

== See also ==
- Life Guards
- List of Swedish infantry regiments
