= Hugo Cederschiöld =

Swedish army general

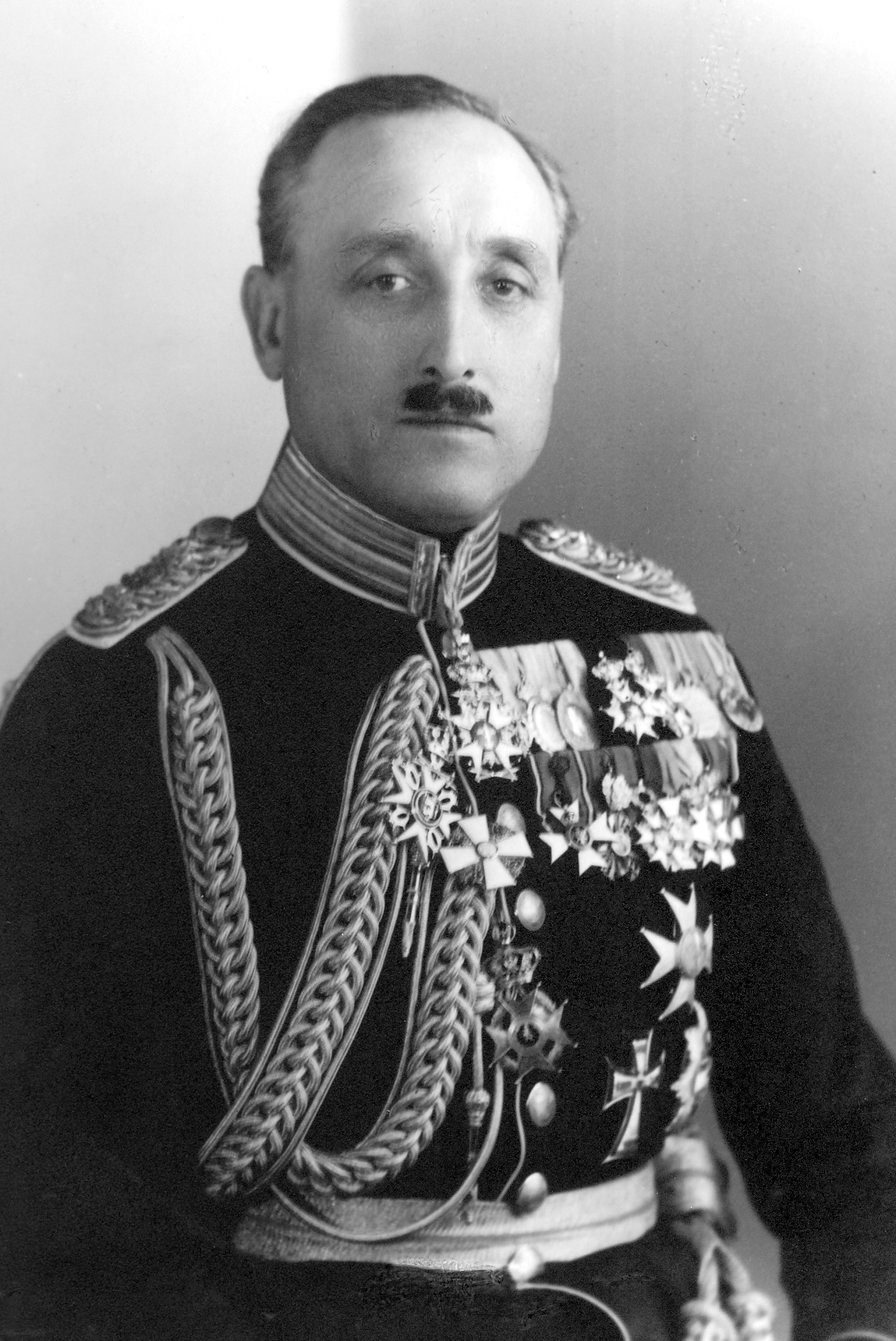
- Cederschiöld as major general in 1940.
- Born: Hugo Montgomery Cederschiöld; 25 September 1878; Stockholm, Sweden
- Died: 17 March 1968 (aged 89); Stockholm, Sweden
- Military career
- Allegiance: Sweden
- Branch: Swedish Army
- Service years: 1898–1950
- Rank: General
- Commands: Infantry Combat School; Life Regiment Grenadiers; Svea Life Guards; Commandant of Stockholm; Stockholm Defence District; Norrtälje Defence District
- Other work: Chief of His Majesty's Military Staff

General Hugo Montgomery Cederschiöld (25 September 1878 – 17 March 1968) was a senior officer in the Swedish Army. He served as commander of Svea Life Guards (1936–1938); Commandant of Stockholm (1938–1945); Commander of Stockholm Defence District (1942–1945); Norrtälje Defence District (1943–1945) and Chief of His Majesty's Military Staff (1950–1963). Cederschiöld also competed at the 1912 Summer Olympics.

== Early life ==
Cederschiöld was born on 25 September 1878 in Stockholm, Sweden, the son of Staffan Cederschiöld, the Director-General of the Swedish Customs, and his wife Sophie (née Montgomery Cederhielm). He was the brother of Pehr Cederschiöld, a district judge.

== Career ==
=== Military career ===
Cederschiöld was commissioned as an officer in Svea Life Guards (I 1) in 1898 with the rank of second lieutenant. He was promoted to lieutenant in 1903, when he served the Duke of Skåne, and was his orderly officer in 1904. He attended the Royal Swedish Army Staff College from 1906 to 1908 and served as regimental adjutant in 1908 and 1st adjutant on the staff of the IV Army Division (IV. arméfördelningen) from 1911 to 1915. Promoted to captain in 1912, he served as adjutant to the Crown Prince the same year. Cederschiöld served as brigade quartermaster in the 7th Infantry Brigade from 1917 to 1922. He was an expert and secretary of the Shooting Instruction Committee in 1918. He taught at the Infantry Combat School from 1919 to 1923, an expert and secretary in the Drill Regulations Committee from 1921 to 1922, and was promoted to major in 1921 before serving at Svea Life Guards (I 1) in 1922. Cederschiöld was again an expert and secretary of the Shooting Instruction Committee from 1922 to 1923 and in the Drill Regulations Committee from 1923 to 1924. In 1924, he was appointed battalion commander in Svea Life Guards (I 1). He was promoted to lieutenant colonel in 1926 and served as the head of Swedish Infantry Combat School from 1926 to 1931. In 1930, He was promoted to colonel and was the chief of staff of the Crown Prince the same year. He was commanding officer of Life Regiment Grenadiers (I 3) from 1931 to 1936.

Cederschiöld was promoted to colonel in 1936 and was appointed commanding officer of the Svea Life Guards on 16 November 1936. He was promoted to major general in the army on 30 April 1937, active from 1 July 1937. On 14 January 1938, it was decided that Cederschiöld would leave his post from 1 October 1938 to become the Commandant of Stockholm, a post he held until 30 September 1943. In 1940, he briefly served as Acting Inspector of the Infantry. From 1 October 1942, he served as Commandant of Stockholm and Commander of Stockholm Defence District. From 1 October 1943 until 1 April 1945, he was Commandant of Stockholm, Defence District Commander of Stockholm Defence District and Norrtälje Defence District. In November 1950, Cederschiöld was appointed 1st Adjutant and Chief of His Majesty's Military Staff and was promoted to lieutenant general in the reserve, where he remained until 31 December 1954. He served as 1st Adjutant and Chief of His Majesty's Military Staff until 23 May 1963. He was promoted to general in the army on the same date.

=== Other work ===
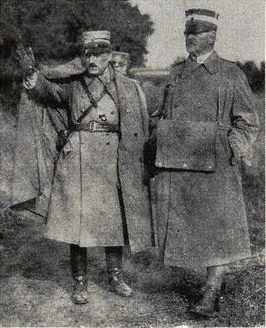
Chief of the General Staff Major General Bo Boustedt (right), Colonel Hugo Cederschiöld (left).

Cederschiöld was a member of numerous committees and was active in the Frivilliga Skytterörelsen (lit. Voluntary Shooting Movement) and the landstorm. He became a member of the Royal Swedish Academy of War Sciences in 1929. He was also president of the Swedish-English Association from 1939 to 1955, president of Stockholm's Rotary Club from 1940 to 1941, and governor of Sweden's Rotary District number 78A (later 84) from 1948 to 1950. Cederschiöld was also member of the European Rotary International Council from 1948 and was chairman of numerous associations.

Cederschiöld competed in two Shooting events at the 1912 Summer Olympics.

== Personal life ==
In 1908 he married Baroness Margareta Wrangel von Brehmer (1888–1967), the daughter of the senior valet de chambre (överstekammarjunkare), Baron Wolmer Wrangel von Brehmer and Countess Ingeborg Ehrensvärd. He was the father of Wolmer (1910–1985), Hugo (1915–1982), Margareta (born 1921) and Ingeborg (1923–2007).

== Death ==
Cederschiöld died on 17 March 1968 and was buried at Hyby New Church in Scania.

== Legacy ==
"General Cederschiöld" is a Swedish military march, composed by military composer Per Grundström. The march was composed in 1936, during Grundström's tenure as music director at Svea Life Guards, and was dedicated to Cederschiöld as the executive officer. It was also adopted as the honorary march of the Härnösand Coastal Artillery Regiment.

== Dates of rank ==
- 1898-12-09: Underlöjtnant
- 1903-01-30: Lieutenant
- 1912-04-12: Captain
- 1921-10-07: Major
- 1926-06-04: Lieutenant colonel
- 1930-05-23: Colonel
- 1937-04-30: Major general
- 1950-??-??: Lieutenant general
- 1963-05-23: General

== Awards and decorations ==
=== Swedish ===
- (Sweden) Crown Prince Gustaf V and Crown Princess Silver Wedding Medal (1906)
- (Sweden) King Oscar II and Queen Sofia's Golden Wedding Medal (1907)
- (Sweden) King Gustaf V's Jubilee Commemorative Medal (1928)
- (Sweden) King Gustaf V's Jubilee Commemorative Medal (1948)
- (Sweden) Commander Grand Cross of the Order of the Sword (6 June 1945)
- (Sweden) Commander 1st Class of the Order of the Sword (6 June 1936)
- (Sweden) Commander 2nd Class of the Order of the Sword (16 June 1933)
- (Sweden) Knight of the Order of the Sword (6 June 1919)
- (Sweden) Commander 1st Class of the Order of Vasa (6 June 1941)
- (Sweden) Officer of the Order of Vasa (6 June 1924)
- (Sweden) Knight of the Order of the Polar Star (10 December 1928)
- (Sweden) Home Guard Medal of Merit in gold (6 July 1957)
- (Sweden) Officers Target Shooting Association's Gold Medal (Officerarnes målskjutningsförbunds guldmedalj) (1918)
- (Sweden) Shooting Badge in gold (1904)
- (Sweden) Sports Badge in gold (1912)

=== Foreign ===
- (Denmark) Grand Cross of the Order of the Dannebrog
- (Denmark) Commander 1st Class of the Order of the Dannebrog
- (Ethiopian Empire) Grand Cross of the Order of the Star of Ethiopia
- Grand Cross of the Order of the Lion of Finland
- (Iceland) Grand Cross of the Order of the Falcon (22 April 1954)
- (Netherlands) Grand Cross of the Order of the House of Orange (April 1955)
- (Norway) Grand Cross of the Order of St. Olav (1 July 1952)
- (Romania) Grand Cross of the Order of the Crown
- (United Kingdom) Knight Grand Cross of the Royal Victorian Order
- (Iran) Grand Cross of the Order of Homayoun
- (United Kingdom) Honorary Knight Commander of the Civil Division of the Order of the British Empire (29 June 1948)
- (Belgium) Commander of the Order of Leopold II
- Commander of the Order of the White Rose of Finland (2 October 1956)
- (Spain) Commander of the Crosses of Military Merit White Decoration
- (Grand Duchy of Baden) Knight Second Class of the Order of the Zähringer Lion with oak leafes (July 1909)
- (France) Knight of the Legion of Honour (1925)
- (Greece) Knight of the Order of the Redeemer (1920)
- (Grand Duchy of Oldenburg) Knight 2nd Class of the House and Merit Order of Peter Frederick Louis with Crown (1912)
- (Kingdom of Prussia) Knight 3rd Class of the Order of the Crown (1912)
- (Denmark) Knight of the Order of the Dannebrog (31 October 1903)
- (Estonia) Knight of the Order of the White Star (1924)
- (United Kingdom) Member of the Royal Victorian Order (1920)
- (Finland) FinlSkFK

Military offices
Preceded by Ernst af Sandeberg	Life Regiment Grenadiers; 1931–1936	Succeeded by Helge Jung
Preceded by Carl Tersmeden	Svea Life Guards; 1936–1938	Succeeded by Henry Tottie
Preceded by None	Commandant of Stockholm; 1938–1945	Succeeded by Nils Stenbeck
Preceded by None	Stockholm Defence District; 1942–1945	Succeeded by Nils Stenbeck
Preceded by Sven Alin	Norrtälje Defence District; 1943–1945	Succeeded by Nils Stenbeck
Court offices
Preceded by Olof Thörnell	Chief of His Majesty's Military Staff; 1950–1963	Succeeded by Thord Bonde
