= Jan-Olof Borgén =

Swedish Army officer

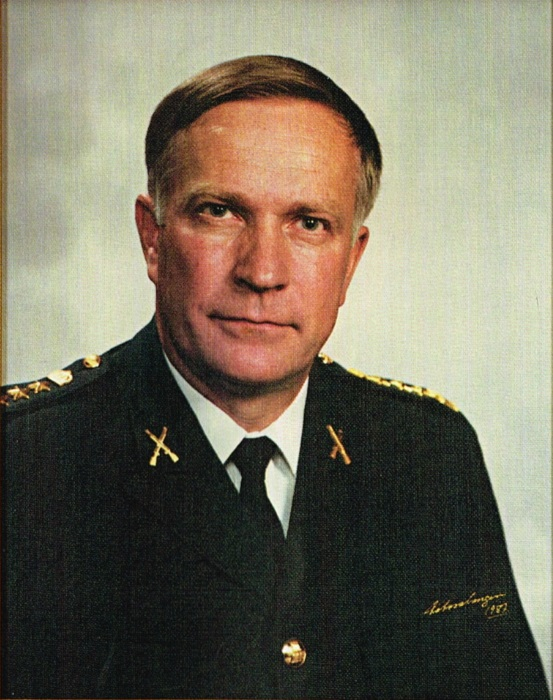
- Borgén in 1987
- Born: 6 December 1937 (age 88); Åsele, Sweden
- Military career
- Allegiance: Sweden
- Branch: Swedish Army
- Service years: 1962–1997
- Rank: Major General
- Commands: Bohuslän Regiment; Svea Life Guards; Stockholm Defence District; Commandant of Stockholm; Chief of Home Guard

Major General Jan-Olof Borgén (born 6 December 1937) is a retired Swedish Army officer. Borgén graduated from the Military Academy Karlberg in Stockholm in 1962. He served in various positions, including platoon leader and company commander, before being promoted to captain in 1970. Over the years, he undertook training courses and held roles in the Swedish Armed Forces Staff College and the Swedish Defence Materiel Administration. He achieved the rank of major general and served as the Chief of Home Guard from 1994 to 1997, and also held leadership roles in organizations like the National Association of Volunteer Motor Transport Corps.

== Early life ==
Borgén was born on 12 July 1947 in Åsele Parish in Åsele, Västerbotten County, Sweden, the son of Runo Borgén and his wife Ingrid (née Olovsson). Borgén passed studentexamen in 1961.

== Career ==
Borgén graduated from the Military Academy Karlberg in Stockholm in 1962 and was commissioned as an officer and assigned as a second lieutenant to the Västerbotten Regiment in Umeå in the same year. He served as a platoon leader and company commander from 1962 to 1968 and was promoted to captain in 1970. He attended the Weapon Technology Course at the Swedish Armed Forces Staff College from 1968 to 1971 and became an aspirant in the Technical Staff Corps (Tekniska stabskåren) in 1971. He served with the Army Staff and the Swedish Defence Materiel Administration from 1971 to 1977, being promoted to major in 1973 and serving as a company commander at the Roslagen Anti-Aircraft Regiment from 1977 to 1978.

In 1978, Borgén was promoted to lieutenant colonel and served as the head of the Equipment Department at the Army Staff from 1978 to 1981. He also served as a battalion commander at the Västerbotten Regiment from 1981 to 1982. From 1982 to 1985, he was the head of System Planning in the System Department at the Main Division for Army Materiel at the Swedish Defence Materiel Administration. He attended the Swedish National Defence College in 1983 and was promoted to colonel in the same year. He served as the commander of the Bohuslän Regiment from 1985 to 1987.

In 1987, he was promoted to senior colonel and subsequently served as the commander of the Svea Life Guards and the Defence District Commander for the Stockholm Defence District from 1987 to 1992. He studied at the Royal College of Defence Studies in London in 1993, was promoted to major general in 1994, and served as the Chief of Home Guard from 1 April 1994 to 30 September 1997. Borgén also held the position of national corps commander in the National Association of Volunteer Motor Transport Corps from 1999 to 2001.

== Personal life ==
In 1960, Borgén married Torborg Holmstedt (born 1938), the daughter of Helge Holmstedt and Margareta (née Lundström).

== Dates of rank ==
- 1962 – Second lieutenant
- ???? – Lieutenant
- 1970 – Captain
- 1973 – Major
- 1978 – Lieutenant colonel
- 1983 – Colonel
- 1987 – Senior colonel
- 1994 – Major general

== Awards and decorations ==
- (Norway) Commander of the Royal Norwegian Order of Merit (1 July 1992)

== Honours ==
- Member of the Royal Swedish Academy of War Sciences (1987)

== Bibliography ==
- Rönnberg, Lennart; Borgén, Jan Olof (1980). Försvar i framtid. Försvar i nutid, 0046-4643; 1980:3 (in Swedish). Stockholm: Centralförb. Folk och försvar. SELIBR 206102.

Military offices
Preceded by Arne Rolff	Bohuslän Regiment; 1985–1987	Succeeded by Kaj Sjösten
Preceded by Rolf Frykhammar	Svea Life Guards Stockholm Defence District; 1987–1992	Succeeded by Göran De Geer
Preceded by Rolf Frykhammar	Commandant of Stockholm; 1987–1992	Succeeded by Göran De Geer
Preceded by Reinhold Lahti	Chief of Home Guard; 1994–1997	Succeeded by Alf Sandqvist
