= National Association of Volunteer Motor Transport Corps Medal of Merit =

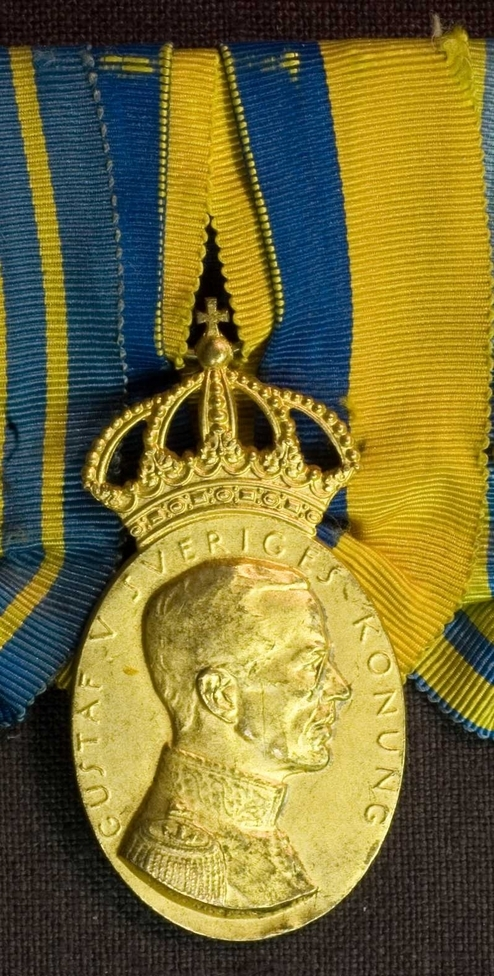
- Type: Semi-official medal (Note: Category K of semi-official medals include, with His Majesty the King's permission established and with his approval, medals (badges) awarded by various organizations. The medals has often the king's image on the obverse.)
- Awarded for: For meritorious work and good personal efforts
- Country: Sweden
- Presented by: National Association of Volunteer Motor Transport Corps
- Eligibility: Swedish and foreign personnel
- Status: Currently awarded
- Established: 1934
- Ribbon bar

The National Association of Volunteer Motor Transport Corps Medal of Merit (Swedish: Frivilliga automobilkårernas riksförbunds förtjänstmedalj, FAKGM/SM) is a Swedish medal awarded by the National Association of Volunteer Motor Transport Corps (FAK) for meritorious work and good personal efforts within FAK's area of activity or within activities particularly benefiting the FAK.

== History ==
The medal was established in 1934 as the Swedish Voluntary Motor Transport Corps Merit Badge (Swedish: Frivilliga Automobilkårens förtjänsttecken, FAKFt). In 1948, the medal change name to Swedish Voluntary Motor Transport Corps Medal of Merit (Swedish: Frivilliga Automobilkårens förtjänstmedalj, FAKg). In 1958, it became the National Association of Volunteer Motor Transport Corps Medal of Merit (Swedish: Frivilliga automobilkårernas riksförbunds förtjänstmedalj, FAKGM/SM).

== Appearance ==
=== Medal ===
The medal of merit in gold (gilded silver) and in silver, is minted in the eighth size in oval shape and bears on the obverse His Majesty the King's image crowned by the royal crown and on the front FAK's mirror monogram and the inscription "To N.N. for merits of the Voluntary Motor Transport Corps" and the year of awarding.

=== Ribbon ===
Divided in yellow, blue and yellow moiré.

== Criteria ==
The national chief of the corps decides on the award with the support of His Majesty the King's gracious consent.

=== Gold ===
- to an individual, the one who through personal effort in a particularly meritorious way has benefited the FAK through particularly fruitful work for as a rule at least 15 years.
- to foreign nationals as the highest honor that the FAK can award for merits of the FAK.

=== Silver ===
- to an individual, who through personal effort has benefited the FAK through extremely profitable activities for as a rule at least 10 years.

== Presenting ==
In addition to the national chief of the corps, the deputy national chief of the corps, the members of the national corps board and union boards have the right to make proposals regarding the awarding of the award. An individual member has the right to submit to the union chief in his or her own union a proposal for the award of the award in accordance with regulations issued by the union board.

Awards must be handed over to the recipient in solemn forms - for example at the national assembly or the union assembly.

== Wearing ==
The gold and silver medals are worn on the left side of the chest in a vertically divided yellow-blue-yellow ribbon.

== See also ==
- National Association of Volunteer Motor Transport Corps Merit Badge
