= National Association of Volunteer Motor Transport Corps =

The National Association of Volunteer Motor Transport Corps (Note: Translated as the National Association of Volunteer Motor Transport Corps or the National Federation of Swedish Voluntary Motor Transport Corps.) (Swedish: Frivilliga automobilkårernas riksförbund, FAK), commonly known as the Swedish Voluntary Motor Transport(ation) Corps (Swedish: Frivilliga Automobilkåren) is a Swedish nationwide voluntary organization with the task of further training drivers to ensure the need for heavy vehicles and buses etc in a crisis situation.

== History ==
The idea to organize a voluntary motor transport corps with a military focus came within the Royal Automobile Club (KAK) in 1908 and after a few years, in 1914, the Voluntary Motor Transport Corps was formed in Stockholm. The members, who were car-borne officers with tasks of mostly communications and courier service committed themselves to having their cars stand to the Swedish Armed Forces' disposal. Until the 1930s, people participated in various military exercises with their vehicles. From 1931, the operations changed. The FAK now became a personnel and training organization. After completing the course, he became a FAK officer with war deployment at, among other things, mobilized units.

As the army was motorized and World War II took place, the tasks changed to staffing car companies and to be responsible for motor training of the Swedish Army's officers. In 1958, the FAK, with its then eight unions, received a national union board and at the same time a civilian focus, to train car drivers for heavy vehicles on behalf of the Swedish Total Defence. In the early 1970s, the FAK was given its current tasks - to be a nationwide voluntary organization with the task of further training drivers to ensure the need for heavy vehicles in a crisis situation.

== Tasks ==
The FAK is a nationwide voluntary organization with the task of further training drivers to ensure the need for heavy vehicles in a crisis situation. It collaborates with other organizations, authorities and companies. The Swedish Civil Contingencies Agency, which, with requirements and documentation from Svenska kraftnät and the Swedish Transport Administration, pays for its training. With the National Society for Road Safety - they have an exchange in road traffic safety issues, of which they are also a member. They also work closely with the Swedish Association of Road Transport Companies (Sveriges åkeriföretag) and have joint courses with sister organizations.

== Awards ==
The National Association of Volunteer Motor Transport Corps (FAK) several medals, jeton and shields of honor for meritorious work and good personal efforts within FAK's area of activity or within activities particularly benefiting the FAK, including the National Association of Volunteer Motor Transport Corps Medal of Merit and the National Association of Volunteer Motor Transport Corps Merit Badge.

== Heads ==
- 1954–1961: Agne Wärnsund
- 1961–1964: Hans Göran Cederberg
- 1964–1967: Helge Blomquist
- 1967–1973: Gunnar Löfroth
- 1973–1975: Nils-Ivar Carlborg
- 1975–1985: Curt Hermanson
- 1985–1989: Karl Eric Holm
- 1989–1993: Börje Wallberg
- 1993–1999: Johan Palmgren
- 1999–2001: Jan-Olof Borgén
- 2001–2005: Henning Jansson
- 2005–2015: Alf Sandqvist
- 2015–20xx: Curt-Ove Jakobsson
