= National Association of Volunteer Motor Transport Corps Merit Badge =

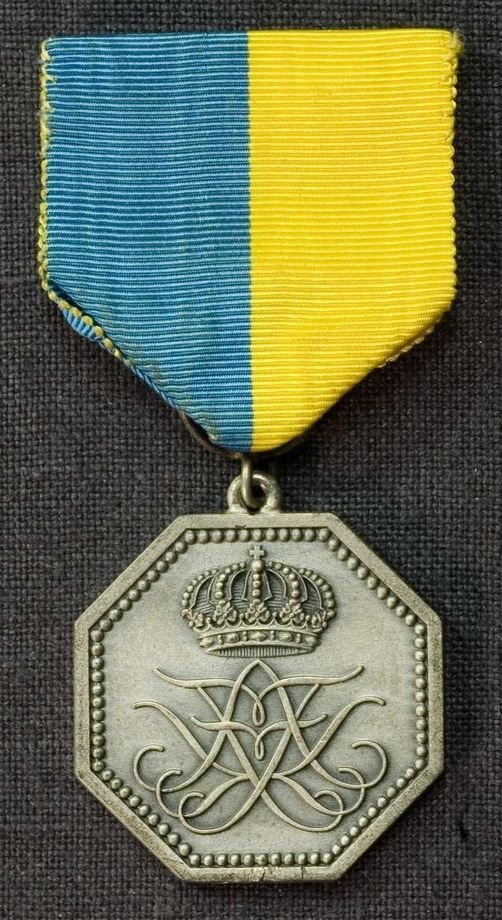
- Merit badge in silver.
- Type: Category L-medal (Note: Category L includes merit badges or remembrance instituted by the Swedish Armed Forces' organizational units (units, centers and schools), the Home Guard and voluntary defense organizations. The category also includes previously granted carrying permits for e.g. officers 'unions (equivalent) and military associations (kamratföreningar) as well as other badges that have been approved by Swedish Armed Forces Headquarters.)
- Awarded for: For meritorious work and good personal efforts
- Country: Sweden
- Presented by: National Association of Volunteer Motor Transport Corps
- Eligibility: Swedish and foreign personnel
- Status: Currently awarded
- Established: 1934
- Ribbon bar

The National Association of Volunteer Motor Transport Corps Merit Badge (Swedish: Frivilliga automobilkårernas riksförbunds förtjänsttecken, FAKGFt/SFt) is a Swedish merit badge awarded by the National Association of Volunteer Motor Transport Corps (FAK) for meritorious work and good personal efforts within FAK's area of activity or within activities particularly benefiting the FAK.

== History ==
The medal was established in 1934 as the Swedish Voluntary Motor Transport Corps Medal of Merit (Swedish: Frivilliga Automobilkårens förtjänstmedalj). In 1948, the medal change name to Swedish Voluntary Motor Transport Corps Merit Badge (Swedish: Frivilliga Automobilkårens förtjänsttecken). In 1958, it became the National Association of Volunteer Motor Transport Corps Merit Badge (Swedish: Frivilliga automobilkårernas riksförbunds förtjänsttecken, FAKGFt/SFt).

== Appearance ==
=== Medal ===
The merit badge in gold (gilded bronze) and in silver (silver-plated bronze) are embossed in octagonal shape, 32x32 mm, and bears on the obverse the FAK's mirror monogram crowned by the royal crown in pearl frame and on the back in pearl frame, the inscription: "To N.N. for merits of the Voluntary Motor Transport Corps" and the year of awarding.

=== Ribbon ===
Divided in blue and yellow moiré.

== Criteria ==
The national chief of the corps decides on the award.

=== Gold ===
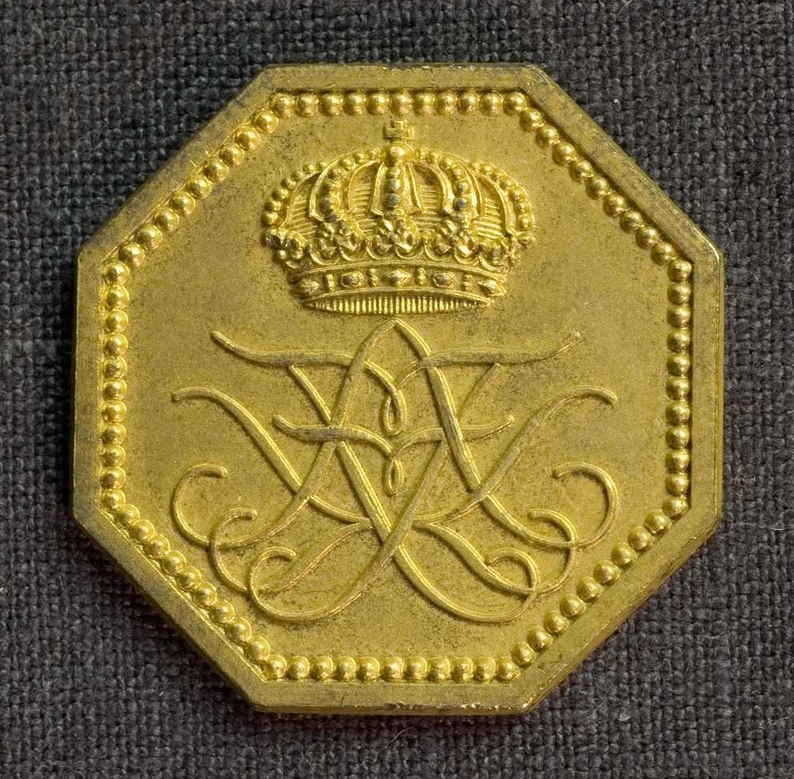
Merit badge in gold.

- to an individual, who through personal effort has benefited the FAK through particularly deserving activity for as a rule at least 7 years.
- to foreign nationals as honors for merits of the FAK.

=== Silver ===
- to an individual, who through personal effort has benefited the FAK through meritorious activities for as a rule at least 3 years.

== Presenting ==
In addition to the national chief of the corps, the deputy national chief of the corps, the members of the national corps board and union boards have the right to make proposals regarding the awarding of the award. An individual member has the right to submit to the union chief in his or her own union a proposal for the award of the award in accordance with regulations issued by the union board.

Awards must be handed over to the recipient in solemn forms - for example at the national assembly or the union assembly.

== Wearing ==
The gold and silver medals are worn on the left side of the chest in a vertically divided yellow and blue ribbon.

== See also ==
- National Association of Volunteer Motor Transport Corps Medal of Merit
