= Börje Wallberg =

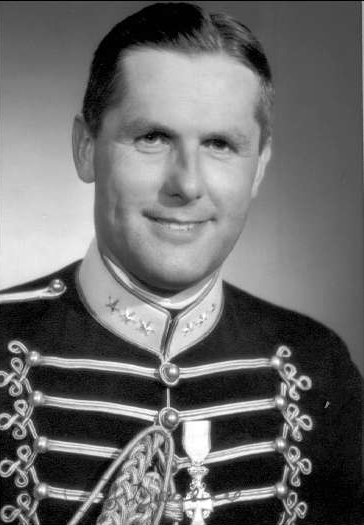
- Born: Karl Gustaf Börje Wallberg; 28 February 1923; Södertälje, Sweden
- Died: 19 December 2014 (aged 91); Stockholm, Sweden
- Military career
- Allegiance: Sweden
- Branch: Swedish Army
- Service years: 1946–1983
- Rank: Senior colonel
- Commands: Norrland Logistic Regiment; Inspector of the Swedish Army Service Troops

Senior Colonel Karl Gustaf Börje Wallberg (28 February 1923 – 19 December 2014) was a Swedish military officer and philatelist. Wallberg graduated from the Military Academy Karlberg in 1946 and pursued a long career in the Swedish Army, serving in a range of command, staff, and instructional roles until his retirement in 1983. His career included service in the Life Regiment Hussars, the General Staff Corps, and the Göta and Norrland Logistic Regiments. He held senior positions at the Swedish Armed Forces Staff College, where he worked with strategy and army planning, and later served as Inspector of the Swedish Army Service Troops from 1974 to 1983, after being promoted to senior colonel.

Alongside his military duties, Wallberg was deeply engaged in international law, human rights, and the laws of war. He taught these subjects both within Sweden and internationally, served as an expert and delegate in several national bodies on international law, and was chairman of the Swedish Red Cross from 1981 to 1987. He also held leadership roles within the National Association of Volunteer Motor Transport Corps.

Outside the military, Wallberg was one of Sweden's most distinguished philatelists. He held leading positions in the Philatelic Society of Sweden, acted as an international exhibition juror, and served as Secretary General of the international exhibition Stockholmia 86. He received the Strandell Medal in 1987 and was added to the Roll of Distinguished Philatelists in 1994.

== Early life ==
Wallberg was born on 28 February 1923 in Södertälje Parish in Södertälje, Stockholm County, Sweden, the son of John Wallberg, an office manager, and his wife Eugenia Palm. Wallberg passed studentexamen in Stockholm in 1943.

== Career ==
=== Military career ===
Wallberg graduated as an officer from the Military Academy Karlberg in Stockholm in 1946 and was commissioned the same year as a second lieutenant in the Life Regiment Hussars in Skövde. He served with the regiment until 1957, and in that year was also promoted to ryttmästare (cavalry captain). From 1954 to 1956, he studied at the Royal Swedish Army Staff College. In 1959, he was promoted to captain in the General Staff Corps and served from 1959 to 1964 on the staff of the III Military District. In 1964, he was promoted to major in the Göta Logistic Regiment, where he served from 1964 to 1965.

From 1965 to 1968, he served as a military assistant at the National Swedish Board of Economic Defence, and was promoted to lieutenant colonel in 1966. In 1968, he entered the General Staff Corps, after which he served as chief instructor in strategy at the Swedish Armed Forces Staff College from 1968 to 1970. He was promoted to colonel in 1970, and from 1970 to 1972 served as head of the Army Program at the Swedish Armed Forces Staff College. From 1972 to 1974, he was commander of the Norrland Logistic Regiment. In 1974, he was promoted to senior colonel, after which he served as Inspector of the Swedish Army Service Troops from 1974 to 1983.

=== Engagements and appointments ===
In addition to his regular military duties, Wallberg took a strong interest in international law, human rights, and the laws of war. He taught these subjects both within the Swedish Armed Forces and internationally. From 1979 to 1984, he served as an expert on the 1978 Committee on International Law, was a member of the Delegation for International Law from 1985 to 1988, and served as chairman of the Swedish Red Cross from 1981 to 1987. He was Deputy National Corps Commander of the National Association of Volunteer Motor Transport Corps from 1981 to 1983 and again from 1987 to 1989, and National Corps Commander from 1989 to 1993.

A major leisure interest for him was philately, and he was regarded as one of Sweden's greatest philatelists of all time. He served as Secretary General of the Philatelic Society of Sweden (Sveriges Filatelistförbund) from 1967 to 1976 and as Vice Chairman from 1983 to 1984, and was an honorary member of the society. From 1976 onward, he worked as a juror at international stamp exhibitions and served as Secretary General of the international exhibition Stockholmia 86 from 1983 to 1987. From 1992 to 2000, he was Chairman of the Association of Friends of the Swedish Postal Museum (Postmusei vänner). He was awarded the Strandell Medal in 1987 and was inducted into the Roll of Distinguished Philatelists in 1994.

== Personal life ==
Börje Wallberg

Wallberg was married 1951–1973 to Annie-Marie Kvarforth (born 1928), the daughter of Lieutenant John Kvarforth and Julia Hansson. In 1973, he married the archivist Evabritta Personne.

== Death ==
Wallberg died on 19 December 2014 in Oscar Parish, Stockholm, Sweden. He was interred on 8 July 2015 at Danderyd Cemetery.

In an obituary, he is characterized as follows: "Börje Wallberg's broad knowledge and deep interest in people, history, strategy, and pedagogy made him highly appreciated by both colleagues and students. His leadership was widely recognized as broad-minded and attentive. His one-on-one conversations with students were conducted with great respect for the individual and served as support for young officers' continued careers and professional development."

== Dates of rank ==
- 1946 – Second lieutenant
- ? – Lieutenant
- 1957 – Ryttmästare
- 1959 – Captain
- 1964 – Major
- 1966 – Lieutenant colonel
- 1970 – Colonel
- 1974 – Senior colonel

== Awards and decorations ==
- (Sweden) H. M. The King's Medal, 12th size gold (silver-gilt) medal worn around the neck on the Order of the Seraphim ribbon (1993)
- (Sweden) Commander of the Order of the Sword (1974)
- (Sweden) Knight 1st Class of the Order of the Sword (1965)
- (Denmark) Knight of the Order of the Dannebrog
- (Sweden) Strandell Medal (1987)
- (Sweden) Wallberg Medal (2007)

== Honours ==
- Member of the Royal Swedish Academy of War Sciences (1976)
- Honorary member of the Philatelic Society of Sweden
- Signatorie to the Roll of Distinguished Philatelists (1994)

Military offices
Preceded by Dag Nordenskiöld	Inspector of the Swedish Army Service Troops; 1974–1983	Succeeded by Curt Sjöö
