= Carl Johan Wachtmeister =

Swedish Army colonel (1903–1993)

Count Carl Johan Wachtmeister
- Born: 1 February 1903; Skövde, Sweden
- Died: 22 May 1993 (aged 90); Stockholm, Sweden
- Burial place: Galärvarvskyrkogården
- Military career
- Allegiance: Sweden
- Branch: Swedish Army
- Service years: 1925–1963
- Rank: Colonel
- Commands: Norrland Dragoon Regiment; Stockholm Defence District

Count Carl Johan Wachtmeister (1 February 1903 – 22 May 1993) was a Swedish Army officer and fencer. He served as commanding officer of Norrland Dragoon Regiment (1952–1957) and the Stockholm Defence District (1957–1963).

== Early life ==
Wachtmeister was born on 1 February 1903 in Skövde, Sweden, the son of Lieutenant Colonel, Count Fredrik Wachtmeister and his wife Greta Lindström.

== Career ==
Wachtmeister was commissioned as an officer after graduating from the Royal Military Academy in 1925 with the rank of second lieutenant. He attended the Royal Central Gymnastics Institute from 1928 to 1930 and the Royal Swedish Army Staff College from 1937 to 1939. Wachtmeister was promoted to ryttmästare in the Life Regiment Hussars (K 3) in 1940 and to captain of the General Staff Corps in 1942. He then served as Aide-de-camp to His Majesty the King Gustaf V from 1942 to 1950.

Wachtmeister was promoted to major in 1944 and he became major of the General Staff Corps in 1946. He served as chief of staff of the IV Military District from 1946 to 1949 and became lieutenant colonel of General Staff Corps in 1948 and of Hälsinge Regiment (I 14) in 1949. Wachtmeister was promoted to colonel in the cavalry and appointed regimental commander of Norrland Dragoon Regiment (K 4) in 1952. Five years later, Wachtmeister was appointed Commendant of Stockholm and Defence District Commander for Stockholm Defence District (Fo 44). He attended the Swedish National Defence College in 1958 and served as Defence District Commander until 1963 when he retired from the Swedish Armed Forces. Wachtmeister then worked as an expert i preparedness issues from 1963 to 1981.

He was chairman of the Swedish Fencing Association (Svenska Fäktförbundet) from 1948 to 1952. He competed in the team sabre event at the 1936 Summer Olympics.

== Personal life ==
Carl Johan Wachtmeister
Personal information
- Born: 1 February 1903 Skövde, Sweden
- Died: 22 May 1993 (aged 90) Stockholm, Sweden

Sport
- Sport: Fencing

In 1929, he married Birgit Thuresson (1906–1986), the daughter of the major in the Road and Waterway Construction Service Corps, Elis Thuresson and Carin Santesson. They had two children: Carl-Fredrik (born 1936) and Caroline (born 1939).

== Death ==
Wachtmeister died on 22 May 1993 in Oscar Parish, Stockholm. He was buried on 7 July 1993 in Galärvarvskyrkogården in Stockholm.

== Dates of rank ==
- 1925 – Second lieutenant
- 1939 – Ryttmästare
- 1942 – Captain
- 1944 – Major
- 1948 – Lieutenant Colonel
- 1952 – Colonel

== Awards and decorations ==
=== Swedish ===
- (Sweden) King Gustaf V's Jubilee Commemorative Medal (1948)
- (Sweden) King Gustaf V's Commemorative Medal (1951)
- (Sweden) Commander 1st Class of the Order of the Sword (4 June 1960)
- (Sweden) Knight of the Order of the Polar Star
- (Sweden) Knight of the Order of Vasa
- (Sweden) Swedish Fencing Federation Honorary Shield (Svenska fäktförbundets hederssköld) (1952)

=== Foreign ===
- (Norway) Commander of the Order of St. Olav with Star
- Commander 1st Class of the Order of the Crown of Thailand
- (Denmark) Knight of the Order of the Dannebrog
