= Kungsängen =

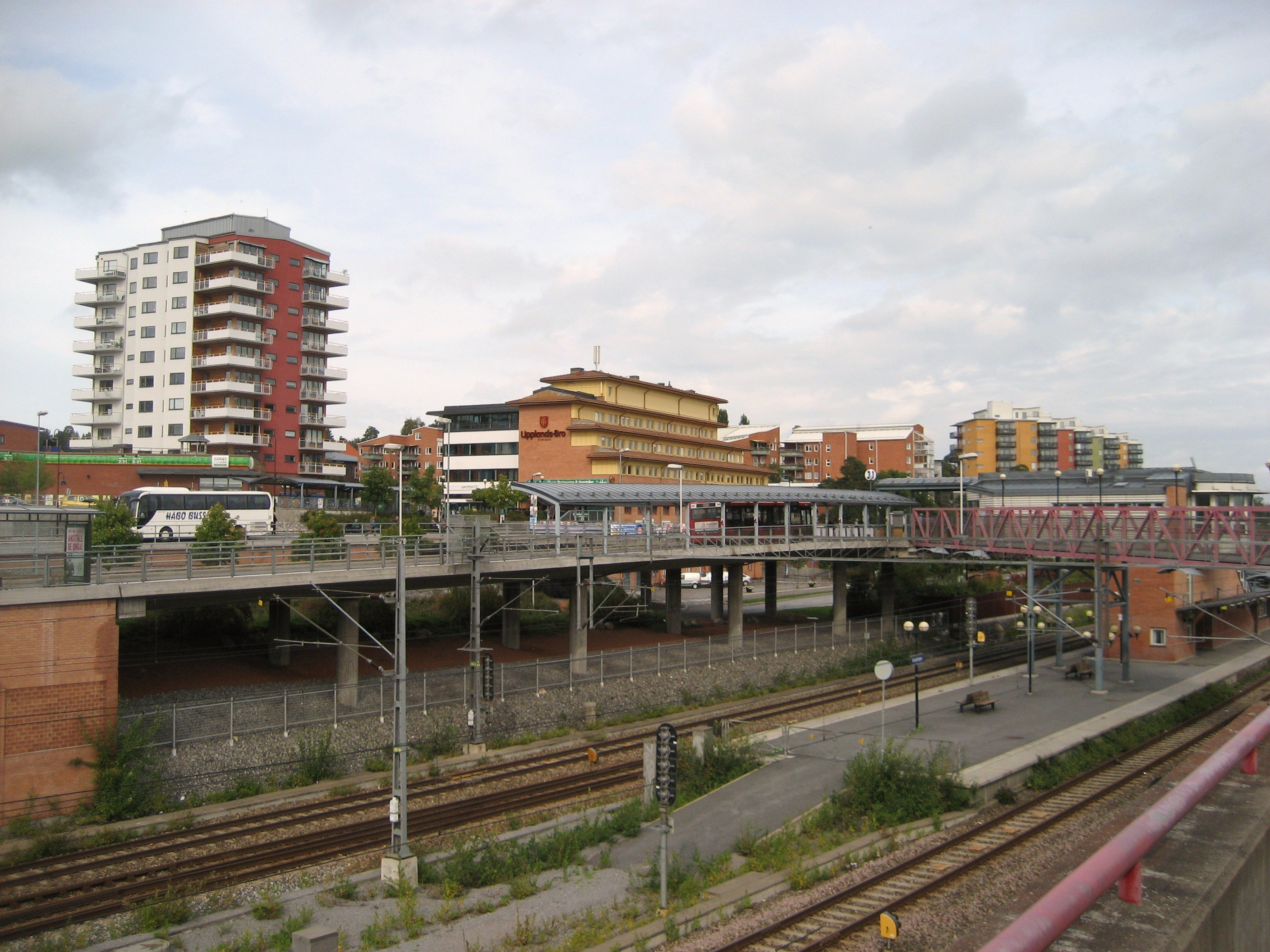
- Kungsängen Train Station in September 2010

- Location within Stockholm Location within Sweden Location within European Union
- Coordinates: 59°29′N 17°45′E
- Country: Sweden
- Province: Uppland
- County: Stockholm County
- Municipality: Upplands-Bro Municipality

Area
  - Total: 3.63 km^{2} (1.40 sq mi)

Population (31 December 2020)
  - Total: 12,497
  - Density: 3,440/km^{2} (8,920/sq mi)
- Time zone: UTC+1 (CET)
  - Summer (DST): UTC+2 (CEST)

Kungsängen (English: King's Meadow) is a locality and the seat of Upplands-Bro Municipality, Stockholm County, Sweden, with 9,382 inhabitants in 2010.
