= Defence District Commander =

The Defence District Commander (Note: Försvarsområdesbefälhavare is translated as Defence District Commander or as Commander of a Defense Area or Commander, XXX Defence District as in Commander, Stockholm Defence District.) (Swedish: Försvarsområdesbefälhavare, Fobef) within the Swedish Armed Forces was a senior commanding officer who led forces in a geographical/military territorial district, or within a specific area of responsibility. The post was created in 1942 in connection with the Defence Act of 1942 and was terminated in 2000 through the Defence Act of 2000.

== History ==
In Sweden, the Defence District Commander was a military authority in the Total Defence (Totalförsvaret) at a lower regional level, as well as the position of head of this authority. The Defence District Commander was essentially the commander of a defence district, and in turn was subordinated to a Commanding General of Military Command (Militärbefälhavare, MB). Within each defence district, which was a geographical part of a military district, and broadly geographically aligned with the Swedish counties, the Swedish government appointed a Defence District Commander. The positions were at the Senior Colonel/Senior Captain level. The Defence District Commander's position was created in 1942 through the Defence Act of 1942. The task of the Defence District Commander (with the support of the Defence District Staff) was to, under the Commanding General of Military Command, direct the territorial operations within his military district. In the military district, the Defence District Commander carried out coordination with the civilian parts of the Total Defence.

Through the so-called OLLI reform (OLLI-reformen) that was carried out within the Swedish Armed Forces from 1973 to 1975, the military districts came to be amalgamated with a regiment, which came to be called Defence District Regiment (Försvarsområdesregemente). The amalgamation meant that the regimental commander, then acting as the Defence District Commander, was able to coordinate the mobilization of brigades and military district units. The responsibility for mobilization and materiel in the entire military district was transferred to the Defence District Regiment, which led to better conditions for coordinated war planning in the defence district.

As the Swedish Armed Forces became a unified government agency on 1 July 1994, the Defence District Commander ceased to be its own authority, but remained as a position with the same function. The position was terminated in 2000 through the Defence Act of 2000.
