= Utter (horse) =

Swedish police horse (1975–2006)

Utter (15 April 1975 – 15 March 2006) was a Swedish police horse who served with the Stockholm police for over 23 years from 1978 to September 2002, a length that made him the longest serving Swedish police horse on record and has been claimed to be a world record. During his service, he participated in a total of 515 changings of the Royal Guards, as well as over 180 protests and 130 sports games. Utter was noted in the media for his resilience, and public demonstrations often involved displays of this, including an Indian python being placed on his head during a 30th birthday celebration.

== Career ==
Utter ("otter" in Swedish) was born on 15 April 1975, and purchased by the Stockholm police in 1978. From 1980, he worked with Ulla-Carin Carlsson-Lindkvist, who would remain his rider until his death. On 29 October 1994, Utter performed his 400th escort of the Royal Guards.

Utter retired in September 2002 after over 23 years of service, but continued making public appearances, often displaying his resilience around various dangers such as firing cap guns or, on his 30th birthday celebration, having an Indian python placed upon his head. After his retirement, Carlsson-Lindkvist took ownership of him.

With over 23 years of service, Utter was the longest-serving police horse in Sweden and has been claimed to be the longest-serving in the world. During his career, he participated in 515 changings of the guard, as well as over 180 protests and 130 football and ice hockey games.

== Death and legacy ==
On 15 March 2006, Utter suffered a fall and had to be euthanized due to his injuries. Ulla-Carin Carlsson-Lindkvist has written three books about her career with Utter.
