= Royal Guards (Sweden) =

King of Sweden's guard of honour, responsible for the protection of the Royal Family

- Swedish: Högvakten
- Coat of arms of the Royal Guards and the Commandant General in Stockholm.
- Active: 1523–present
- Country: Sweden
- Allegiance: King Carl XVI Gustaf
- Branch: Swedish Armed Forces
- Type: Cavalry; Infantry
- Role: Guard of honor
- Garrison/HQ: Stockholm Palace; Drottningholm Palace
- Services included: Swedish Army; Swedish Air Force; Swedish Navy

The Royal Guards (Swedish: Högvakten) is the King of Sweden's cavalry and infantry guards of honour of the Swedish Armed Forces, tasked with the protection of the Swedish royal family.

== History and ceremonies ==
The Royal Guard is normally divided in two parts, the main guard stationed at the Stockholm Palace, and a smaller detachment at Drottningholm Palace. The Royal Guards units has continuously guarded the Swedish royal family in Stockholm since 1523.

The duty of forming a "Royal Guard" is rotated by all serving regular and reserve armed forces, including the Home Guard. However, these detachments only serve for about 5–7 days in each rotation, so most of the year the duty is carried out by the Life Guards regiment of Stockholm, consisting of four battalions, one light infantry, two security, and one guard battalion. Tracing its history through the Household Brigade and Svea Life Guards and Life Guard Dragoons back to the original Royal Guards, this is what constitutes the regiment's claims to being one of the oldest military units and formations in continuous operation.

The Grenadier Company is the honor guard of the Swedish Army's Life Guards for state ceremonies. Their uniform includes bearskin hats, and white baldrics (cross belts) that originally carried the fuses used to light grenades. The grenadiers bear the King's own Life Company banner, which was presented to the unit in 1868 by Charles XV's consort, Queen Louise.

Between April and August, the mounted squadrons in light blue full dress uniforms and silver pickelhaube helmets and the companies in dark blue full dress uniforms with black pickelhaube helmets, both of the Life Guards, can be seen in Stockholm street parades and around the Royal Palace. Accompanied by the mounted band, they depart from the K1 Cavalry barracks in Gärdet, and arrive at the Palace around noon (1 p.m. on Sundays and public holidays) for the changing of the guards ceremony. These events attracts large numbers of tourists each summer.

In the regular guard mounts, the regular royal guard contingent is composed of the personnel from the King's Guards Battalion, Life Guards.

== Gallery ==
Arrival of the Royal Guards in 1897

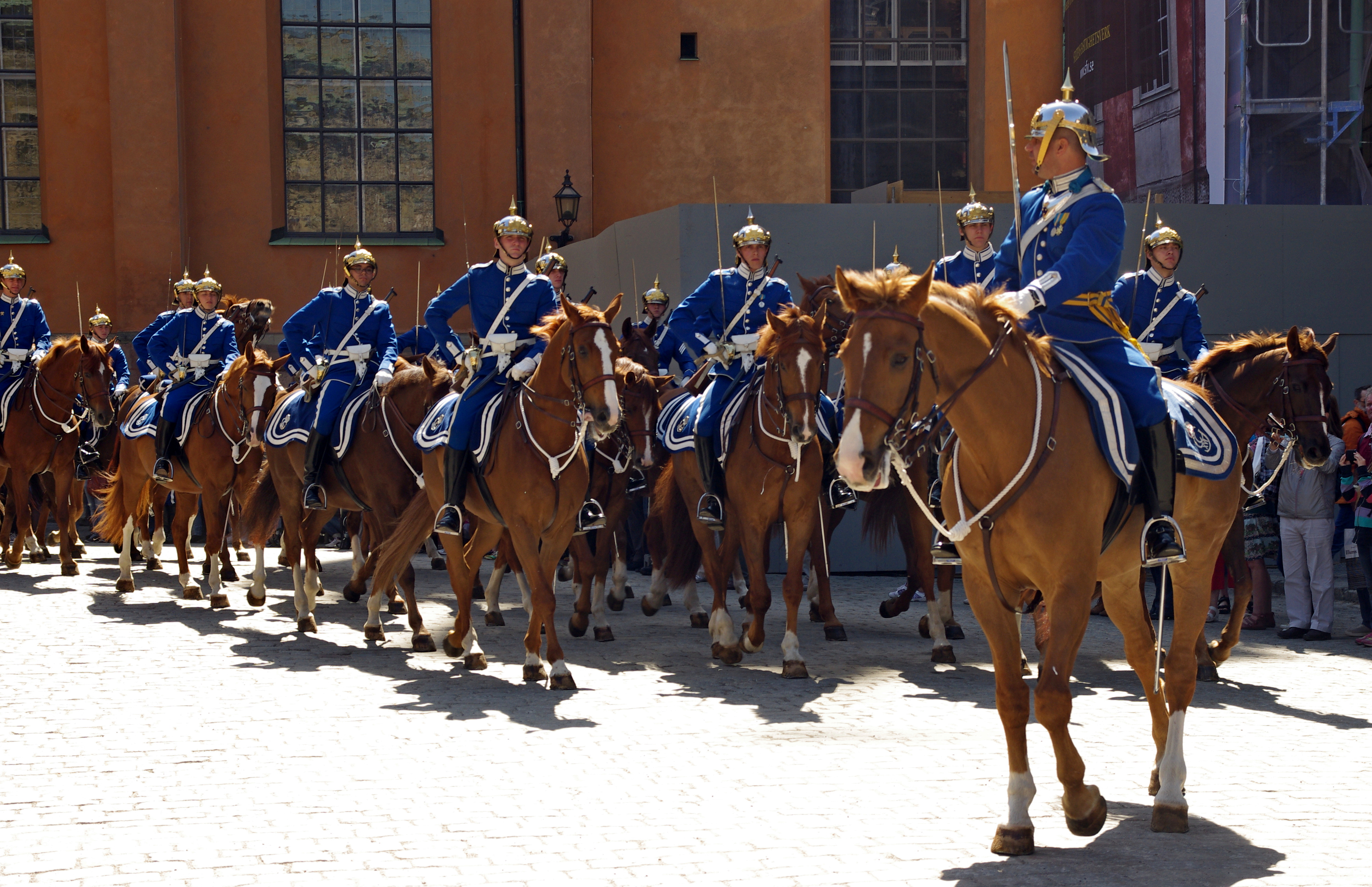
Royal Mounted Guards (2013)

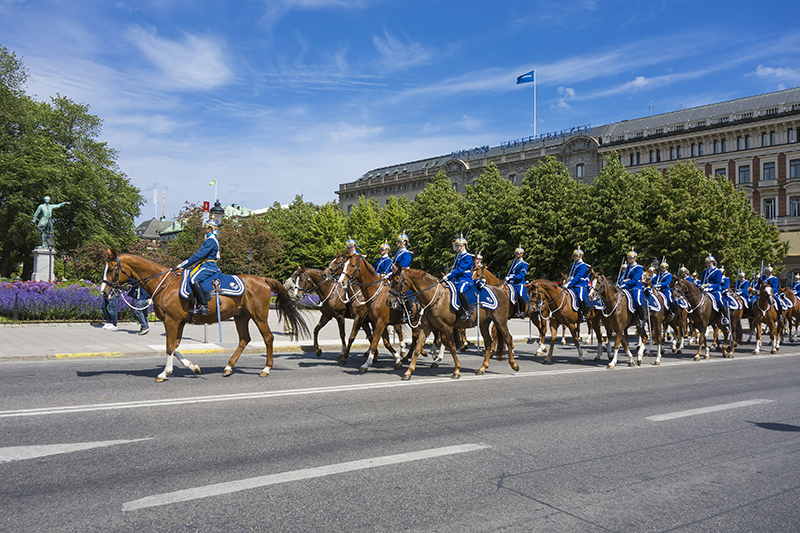
Royal Mounted Guards (2016)

Relieved guard after the changing of the guards ceremony at the Royal Palace. The clear blue uniform is used solely by the soldiers of the Cavalry Battalion

A guard mounting ceremony at the Royal Palace of non-Life Guards units

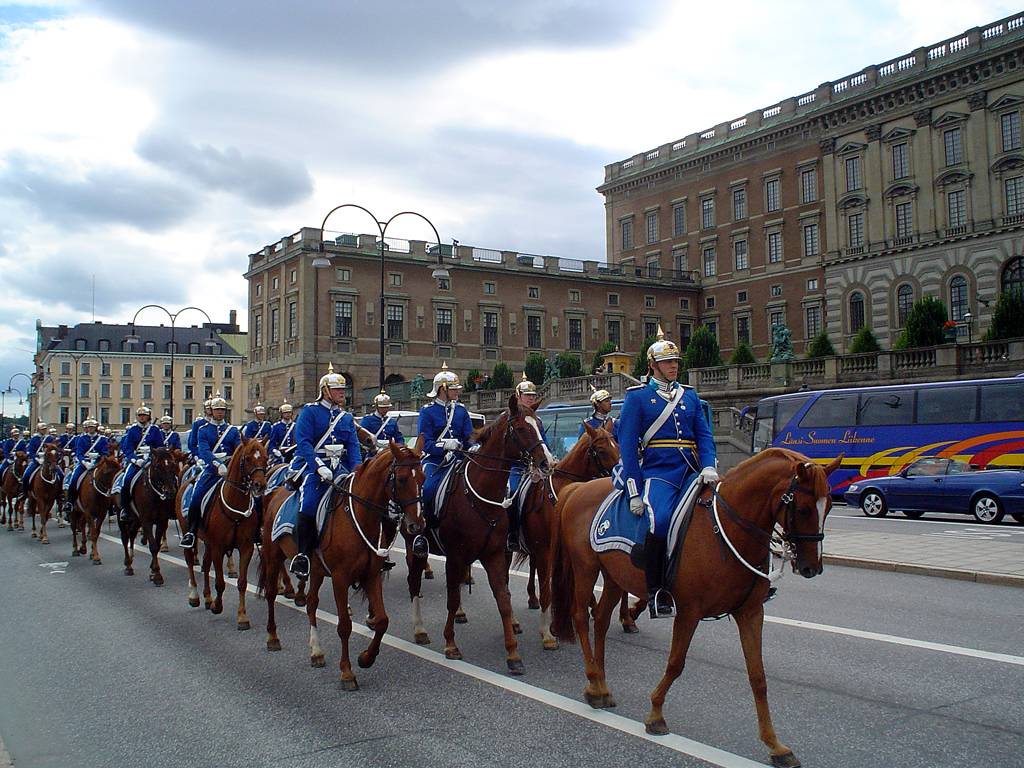
Mounted Royal Guards in front of the palace

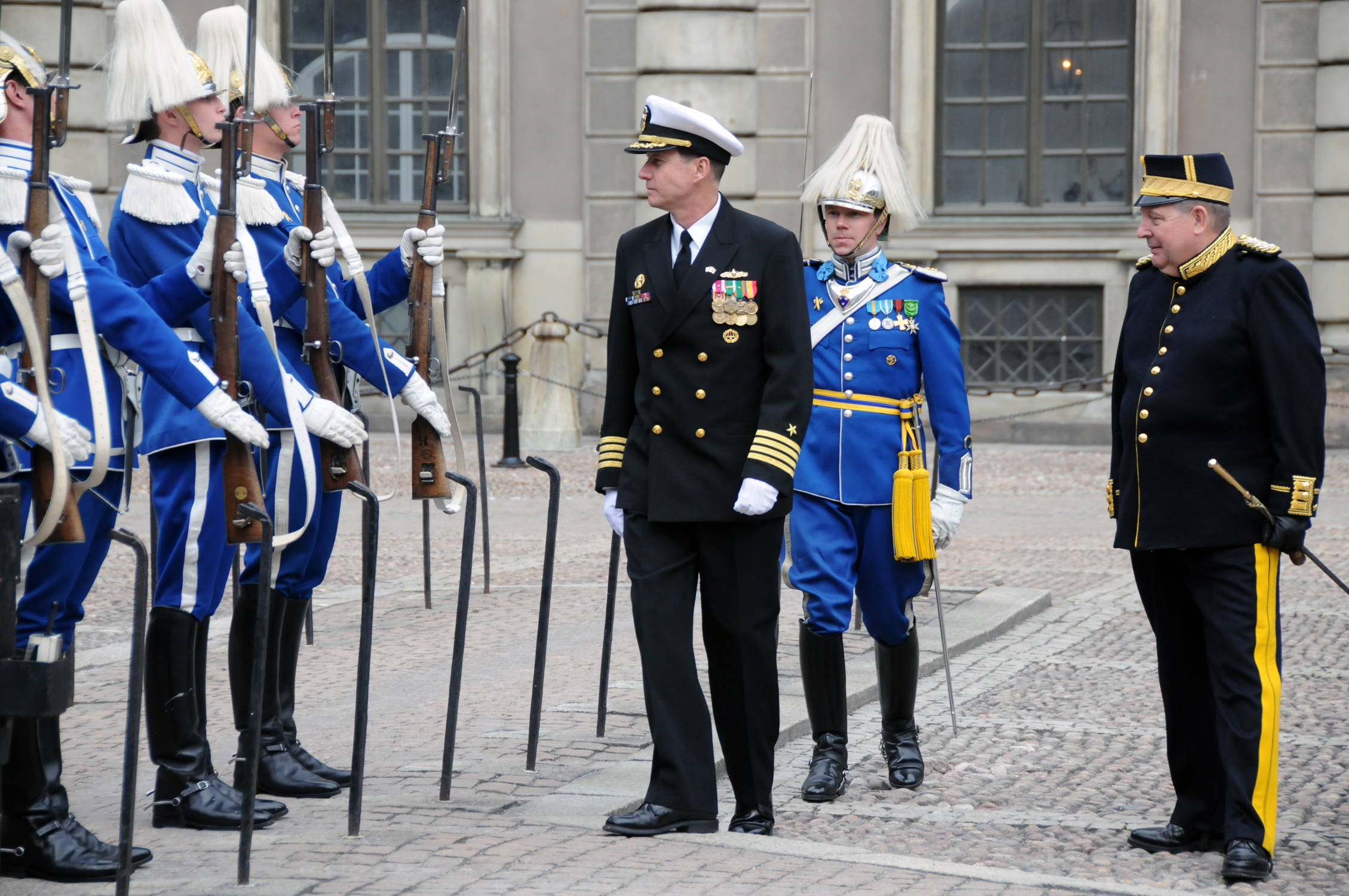
Captain Tim Mahan, commanding officer of the guided-missile cruiser USS Vicksburg (CG-69), inspects the Royal Palace guards (2010)
