= Life Guards (Sweden) =

Swedish Army regiment

Coordinates: 59.51490°N 17.77888°E

- Livgardet
- Coat of arms of the Life Guards.
- Active: 1521–present (lineage); 2000–present (current form)
- Country: Sweden
- Allegiance: Swedish Armed Forces
- Branch: Swedish Army
- Type: Household Infantry and Cavalry
- Role: Infantry, Ceremonial
- Size: 1,300 (4 active battalions, 3 bands, 6 reserve battalions)
- Part of: OPIL (2000–2005); SweAFHQ (2005–present)
- Garrison/HQ: Kungsängen
- Nickname: RHQ
- Mottos: Possunt nec posse videntur ("They do what appears to be impossible") (Note: Svea Life Guards' motto is Possunt nec posse videntur and is translated by the Svea Life Guards to "modern Swedish" as De gör det som syns vara omöjligt ("They do what appears to be impossible"). A more literal translation is De kan, de ser inte bara ut att kunna or De kunna, ehuru de synas icke kunna ("They could, though they seem to not be able"). The motto probably appeared the first time on one of the Life Guard's colours of the 1686 model.)
- Colors: Infantry: yellow Cavalry: white
- March: Infantry: Quick: Kungl. Svea Livgardes Marsch (W. Körner); Slow: Kungl. Svea Livgardes Defileringsmarsch (I. Gustavsson); Old: Kungl. Svea Livgardes Gamla Marsch, Inspektionsmarsch (unknown); Cavalry: Quick - Dragonerna komma (Ericson); Canter - Fehmarn-Sund-Marsch (Piefke)
- Anniversaries: 14 January
- Battle honours: Swedish War of Liberation (1521); Thirty Years' War: Rain (1631); Lützen (1632); Oldendorf (1633); Wittstock (1636); Leipzig (1642); Second Northern War: Warszawa (1656); Fredriksodde (1657); March across the Belts (1658); Scanian War: Halmstad (1676); Lund (1676); Landskrona (1677); Great Northern War: Narva (1700); Düna (1701); Kliszow (1702); Pultusk (1703); Holowczyn (1708); Helsingborg (1710); Russo-Swedish War: Svensksund (1790)

Commanders
- Commander, Life Guards: Colonel Rikard Daleke
- Assistant Commander/Executive Officer Stockholm Area: Colonel Rikard Daleke
- Honorary Colonel-in-chief: His Majesty The King

Insignia
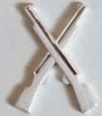
- Branch insignias (infantry)

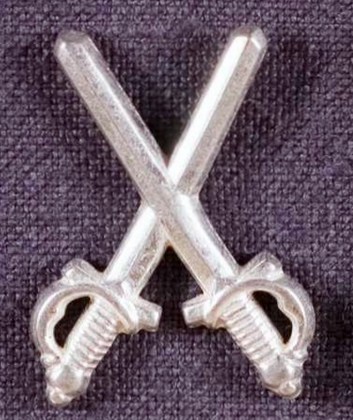
- Branch insignias (cavalry)

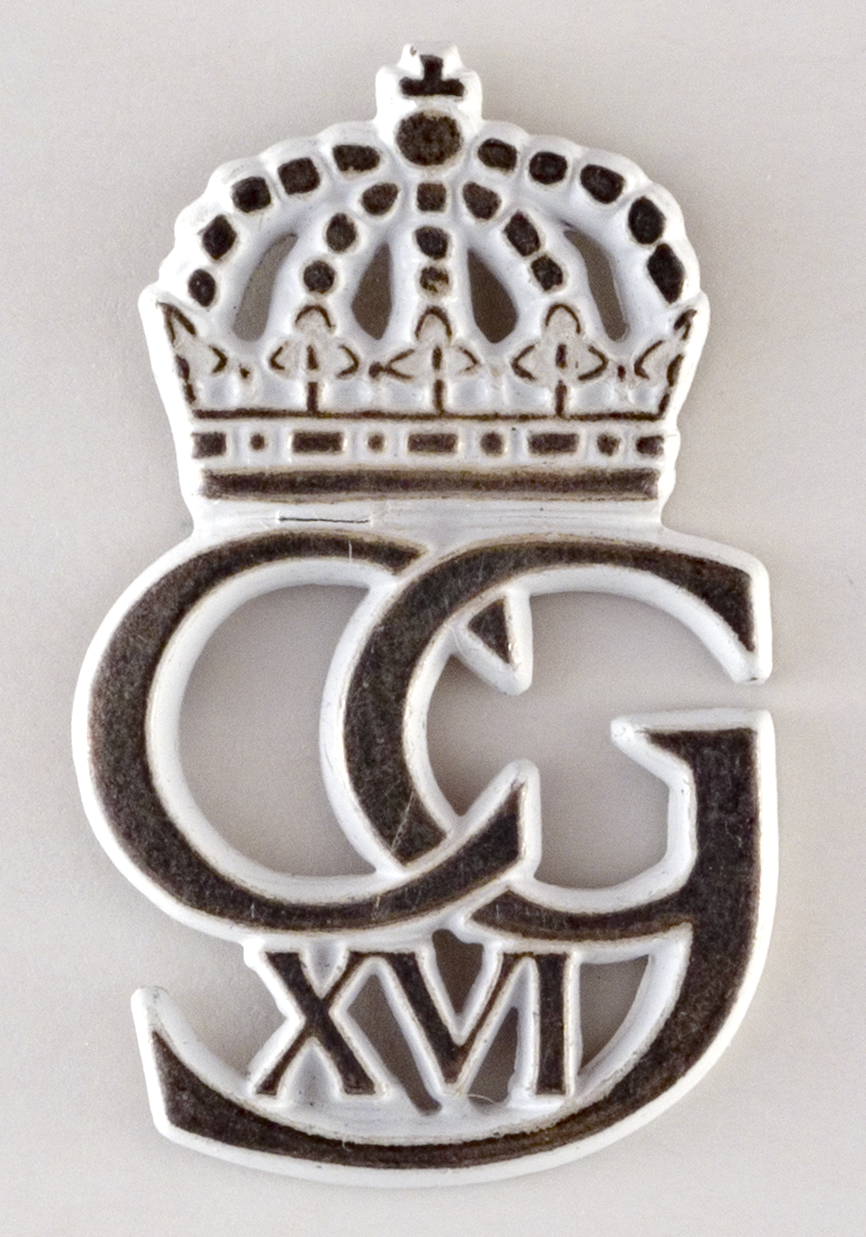
- Unit insignia

The Life Guards (Swedish: Livgardet, designation LG) is a combined Swedish Army cavalry/infantry regiment. Its responsibilities include the defence of Stockholm as well as provision of the royal guard of honour for the King of Sweden and the Stockholm Palace. With traditions dating from 1521, the regiment is one of the oldest military units in continuous operational existence in the world. It was established in its present form in July 2000, following a merger of the Svea Life Guards and the Life Guard Dragoons. Headquarters are mainly located in Brunna north of Kungsängen in Upplands-Bro Municipality and at the "Cavalry Barracks 1" in central Stockholm.

== History ==
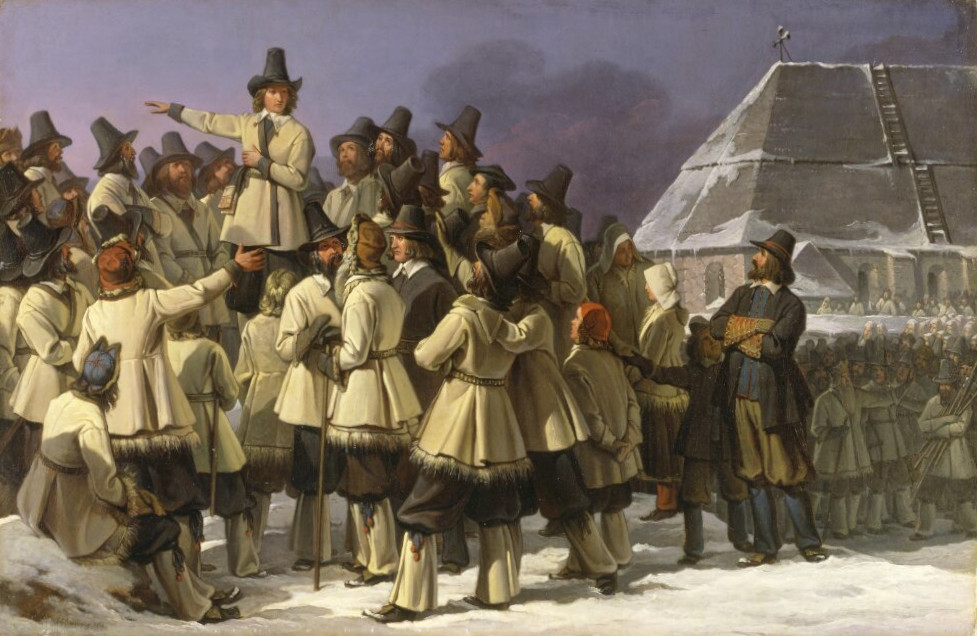
Gustav Eriksson addressing men from Dalarna in Mora. Painting by Johan Gustaf Sandberg.

Svea Life Guards dates back to the year 1521, when the men of Dalarna chose 16 young able men as body guards for Gustav Vasa, thus making the Life Guards one of the world's oldest regiments still on active duty.

The King's Battalion's Life Company is the world's oldest company. Since the year 1523 the section, now enlarged, has been known as the Royal Corps of Halberdiers and, under various names, the regiment has had its natural home at the Palace in Stockholm. The Halberdiers were transformed in 1619 into the Household Company which accompanied Gustavus Adolphus wherever he went in Europe. It was from this time too that the unit was classed as a regiment. In 1633 the company brought the king's body home from Lützen and thereafter formed the basis of Queen Christina's new guards regiment within the royal household.

The three following Carolean kings – Charles X Gustav, Charles XI, and Charles XII – required a government organization that was more mobile and the guards officers and soldiers accompanied them to the various battlefields under the name of His Royal Majesty's Guards. With the destruction of the palace in Stockholm by fire in 1697 the guards' responsibility for the defense of the capital disappeared. The new palace was completed in the 1750s and there was again a need for Life Guards and Household Troops for defending the capital.

During the period 1756–1810 – when there were several palace coups and many assassination conspiracies – the guards officers and the palace guard often played a decisive role. Gustav III tried to exploit this by appointing himself head of the regiment in 1774. The colonel was then given the title of second-in-command or deputy commander and this command hierarchy continued until 1980 when a number of constitutional changes brought it to an end. The Life Guards reckon 19 August 1772, as their proudest day in this period when they supported King Gustav III's bloodless coup against the parliament. The most ignominious day is 20 June 1810 when the Marshal of the Realm, Axel von Fersen, was lynched during the funeral of the crown prince without the regiment intervening in spite of its being on duty.

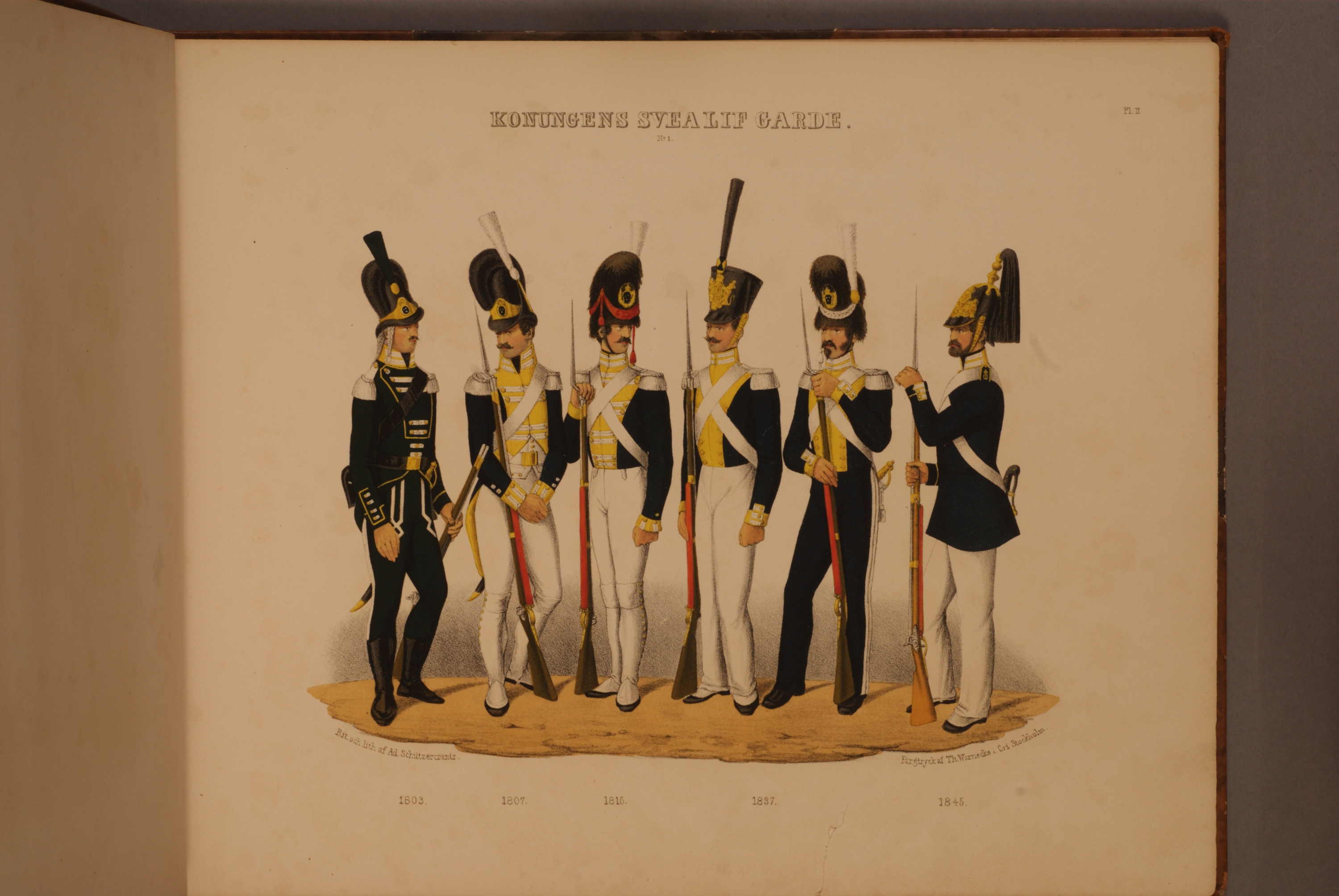
Uniforms of Svea Life Guards 1803-1845, lithography by Adolf Ulrik Schützercrantz

The name was changed to the Svea Life Guards in 1792 and in 1802 the regiment moved to barracks at Fredrikshov. In the ensuing century the unit was used for various tasks. For example, the commander of the capital made use of the men and officers for keeping order in Stockholm. The regiment moved to barracks on Linnégatan in 1888. At the same time there were proposals to extend the training grounds on Ladugårdsgärde and at the beginning of the 1900s an artillery range was commissioned on Järvafält. The Svea Life Guards again moved their barracks in 1946, this time to Ulriksdal on the outskirts of Stockholm. At the end of the 1960s the Municipality of Stockholm wanted to build dwellings on Järva and the regiment was again under increasing pressure to move. In 1970 there was no longer room for the unit in central Stockholm and it was obliged to move men and equipment out to Kungsängen. A positive aspect of the move was that the regiment at last had access to training grounds and artillery ranges adjacent to the barracks.

During the military alert in the 1940s Sweden was divided into a number of defense districts. The idea was that the various staff commands would be wholly responsible for defending their own geographic areas. In 1946 the Stockholm and Norrtälje defence districts were united into the joint Fo 44. In order to reduce administration, the Svea Life Guards were grouped with K 1 out in Kungsängen in 1975–1985. In August 1985 the regiment also assumed responsibility for training K 1. Between 1985 and 1992 the Svea Life Guards also had administrative responsibility for the Armed Forces NBC-defense units, which was also grouped in the barracks at Kungsängen.

The official collective name of Svea Life Guards (I 1/Fo 44), lasted for nine years. In 1994 I 1, IB 1 and K 1 were separated and became independent units. But they retained the old barracks in Kungsängen and on Lidingövägen. The Svea Lifeguards also continued to take responsibility for various administrative duties for the other two units.

With the reorganization of the defense forces, the Svea Life Guards were disbanded on 30 June 2000. Most of the staff and duties are now to be found with the Life Guards. At a solemn ceremony on the inner palace yard, the Life Guards and the Household Brigade were presented with a new colour by King Carl XVI Gustaf. The new colour is a unique artifact presenting the national coat of arms with the chain of the Royal Order of the Seraphim and two supporting lions, as well as all the battle honours, on a white ground.

== Units (2000–2011) ==
=== Guards Battalion ===
The infantry battalion (Guards Battalion) trained ordinary infantry soldiers in both the mechanized and rifle roles, as well as training clerical soldiers. The Guards Battalion consists of three companies:

- Life Company
- 6th company
- 8th company

They are light mechanized companies trained for urban combat with the defense of Stockholm as its first and foremost wartime duty.

=== Dragoons Battalion ===
The cavalry battalion (Dragoons Battalion) had the responsibility for training military police, counter-sabotage units, depot soldiers and guards. The Dragoons Battalion's 4th Squadron was the only mounted cavalry unit in the Swedish Armed Forces. The soldiers of the Life Guards are also frequently used for ceremonial duties like the Royal Guard at the Stockholm Palace, state occasions like the annual opening of the Riksdag and as a guard of honour on the occasion of royal audiences and visits.

== Structure (2016–present) ==
The Life Guards as it exists today has been part of the Swedish Army since 2000, when the functions of three separate guards units, the Svea Life Guards, the Household Brigade and the Life Guards Dragoons, all of which were classed as Household troops, were amalgamated into a single regiment.

As of 2018, the unit employs 448 officers, 575 active soldiers, 470 part-time soldiers, 334 civilian employees and 439 reserve officers; totalling 1,300.

=== King's Guards Battalion ===
The King's Guards Battalion is a combined arms (infantry and cavalry) unit of battalion size responsible for state ceremonial activities and, in the event of war, to protect the Head of state, Prime Minister of Sweden, government and military leadership. The unit specializes in urban warfare and is organized into five companies:

- Battalion Headquarters Company: managing and planning the battalion's operations.
- 10th Staff- & Support Company: infantry, consists of command, staff- and service, mortars, pioneers and recon platoons. The main part is part-time duty.
- Life Company (His Majesty the King's Own Life Company): infantry, three full-time platoons conducting state ceremonial activities on foot, including Royal Guard duties, the Svea Corps of Drums, and one historical platoon.
- Life Squadron: cavalry, implements Mounted Guard and Mounted state ceremonial activities, and dismounted Royal Guard duty.
- 13th Squadron: cavalry, conducting the same duties as the King's Squadron, but the main part is part-time duty.

The whole battalion is based in the old Cavalry Barracks at Lidingövägen in Stockholm. Three of the companies are infantry (Foot Guards) and two are cavalry (Horse Guards).

=== 11th Military Police Battalion ===
The 11th Military Police Battalion serves as the primary military police unit in the Swedish Armed Forces. The battalion consists of a personal security company, two military police companies and an investigation team. The battalion is commanded by the battalion headquarters with support from a staff and support platoon. It is the main formation that provides the Armed Forces with an active unit that maintains law and order and military discipline.

The battalion is heir to the historical cavalry traditions carried from the former Life Guard Dragoons.

=== 12th Motorised Infantry Battalion ===
The 12th Motorised Infantry Battalion is equipped with the Patria XA-360 AMV and is specialized in urban warfare. It can operate both nationally and internationally. The battalion was raised in 2016 when the Guards Battalion and the 7th Infantry Battalion (shared with the Life Regiment Hussars) were amalgamated. The main part of the battalion consists of part-time officers and soldiers. The HQ and Support Company consists of full-time officers and soldiers.

The battalion has its roots in the Svea Life Guards and carries the traditions of the guards infantry.

=== 13th Counter-intelligence battalion ===
The 13th Counter-intelligence Battalion is specialised in managing the five generic security threats: crime, subversion, intelligence, sabotage and terrorism. It contains counter-intelligence companies from the Army, the Amphibious Corps and the Swedish Air Force.

The Battalion is successor to the cavalry traditions of the old Life Guard Dragoons. However, this is a tri-service battalion, which means that its operators wear the rank insignia of their respective service branch.

=== Commandant of Stockholm ===
(Swedish: Kommendantstaben i Stockholm)

From 2000 to 2017, the commander of the Life Guards also held the appointment of Commandant of Stockholm and had a Commandant Staff subordinated to him. The staff is responsible for planning and managing state ceremonial duties in Stockholm and work as a link between the Swedish Armed Forces, the Cabinet Office and the Royal Court. The staff is based at the Royal Guard's Wing at the Royal Palace in Stockholm.

=== Swedish Armed Forces Dog Unit (FMHE) ===
The Swedish Armed Forces Dog Unit (Försvarsmaktens hundenhet, FMHE) is responsible for the acquisition and training of military dogs within the Swedish Armed Forces. The unit is based in Märsta and Sollefteå.

=== Swedish Armed Forces International Centre (Swedint) ===
The Swedish Armed Forces International Centre (Försvarsmaktens internationella centrum, Swedint) is responsible for the training of soldiers going on international duty. The unit is based in Granhammar Barracks in Kungsängen.

=== Swedish Armed Forces Music Corps (FöMus) ===
The Swedish Armed Forces Music Corps, which falls under the Life Guards, is responsible for all military music responsibilities in the Swedish Armed Forces including concerts, changing of the guards and state ceremonial duties. It consists of three military bands:

- Royal Swedish Army Band is the biggest military band in the Swedish Armed Forces. It wears the uniform of the Göta Life Guards (2nd Guards). The band is based in Stockholm.
- Life Guards' Dragoon Music Corps is a cavalry brass band playing by horseback. It wears the uniform of the Life Guard Dragoons. The band is based in Stockholm.
- Royal Swedish Navy Band is a military band based in Karlskrona. While reporting directly to the Life Guards, the Navy Band serves as part of the Swedish Navy.

== Uniforms ==
=== 1886 (Infantry) ===
The units with infantry traditions wear the uniform of the Svea Life Guards dating from 1886. Some alterations have taken place since, but the basic design of the uniform consists unchanged.

The blue ceremonial uniform includes a tunic with a yellow collar and one buttonhole on each side. The cuffs are yellow with three white embroidered buttonholes. One of the three buttons on each cuff is unbuttoned. On the tunic front are eight buttons. The shoulder straps are yellow with the royal cypher in silver. The buttonholes are edged in silver braid for non-commissioned officers (OR-6 and up) and silver embroidery for commissioned officers. The trousers have 2–3 mm wide yellow stripes.

The headgear is a casque or pickelhaube dating from 1887 and made out of varnished leather, with silver metal details. The spike on top can be replaced with a white plume made of white buffalo hair. The pickelhaube plate on front portrays the Lesser Coat of Arms with a lion holding a banner on each side.

In 1823, Emperor Alexander I of Russia presented King Charles XIV John with a gift of bearskin headdresses to be worn by the Svea Life Guards. The next year the Second Life Guards (later Göta Life Guards) were also presented with bearskin of the same design. The bearskin headdresses are still worn by the Grenadier Company during state visits and the State Opening of Parliament each year. It is today made of nylon instead of real bearskin because the smell (would it get wet) is said to scare the horses during parades.

The weapon mainly used in ceremonial duties is the mauser m/1896-1938 with bayonet. The standard issue Ak 5c may also be used as an exception together with the parade uniform. Officers carry the sword m/1899 with a gold and blue sword knot, while specialist officers carry the NCO pattern of the same sword, but with a silver and blue sword knot.

=== 1886 (Swedish Armed Forces Music Staff and Swedish Army Band) ===
The Royal Swedish Army Band wears the uniform of the Second Life Guards (later on the Göta Life Guards) that has an almost identical uniform to the Svea Life Guards, but with red facings on collars, cuffs and trouser stripes. From 1830 on the epaulets for officers have also differed slightly. Drummers wear white or silver chevrons across the sleeves of the tunic to stand out in battle. These were originally worn on the uniform from 1860 and earlier, but were restored as of 2010. Musicians with the rank of a soldier or group leader (OR-1/5) also wear white bragoons on the shoulders to stand out.

As most of the musicians have civil ranks, they wear all cockades in blue and yellow instead of full yellow. Musicians are not allowed to wear swords while marching, but may use the same sword as the infantry while appearing alone.

=== 1895 (Cavalry) ===
Those units which have inherited traditions from the cavalry wear the uniform of the Life Horse Guards dating from 1895. The shade of colour has changed a couple of times (even by mistake), but has now reverted to the original one where soldiers wear middle blue and officers a slightly lighter version of middle blue.

The headgear is a silver-plated cuirassier-type helmet from 1879. It was originally a dragoon-type back in 1879 but was changed into a cuirassier-type in 1900 and with some additions in 1928 it is now called helmet m/1879-1900-1928.

Officers wear a silver braid cross-belt with a silver cartouche box from 1847 with the Lesser Coat of Arms with the Royal Order of the Seraphim. Non-commissioned officers (OR-6 and above) wear a white braid cross-belt with a black leather cartouche box from 1895 with the Lesser Coat of Arms surrounded by beams and two swords, all in gold.

The weapon mainly used in ceremonial duties is the mauser m/1894-1914 with bayonet. The standard issue Ak 5c may also be used as an exception together with the parade uniform. Officers and specialist officers carry sword m/1893 with a gold and blue (officers) or silver and blue (specialist officers) sword knot. Soldiers carry the soldier's sword pattern m/1893 on mounted duty or guard of honour, with a chamois leather sword knot.

==== Swedish Mounted Cavalry Band ====
Musicians with the equivalent rank of privates wear in the service dress red shoulder boards instead of the dragoons' white to distinguish them on the battlefield. They also wear white braid Prussian styled wings to even more be distinguished. Musicians with the rank of officers or specialist officers wear the same uniform as officers, with the exception of having a blue and yellow cockade instead of a full yellow (stating that they bear civil ranks).

==== Changes in 1928 ====
As of 1928, the Life Horse Guards (1st Cavalry) and Life Regiment Dragoons (2nd Cavalry) were amalgamated into the Life Regiment of Horse (1st Cavalry). The uniforms remained mostly the same as of the old 1st Cavalry, taking the traditions with some additions from the old 2nd Cavalry.

- The Officer's Frock Coat m/1858 was middle blue (slightly lighter) for the 1st Cavalry, but after 1928 the model of the 2nd Cavalry was adapted, which is dark blue with black lacing.
- The helmet m/1879-1900 of the 1st Cavalry was added a golden laurel wreath, taken from the helmet of the 2nd Cavalry. This was added for all ranks. The helmet with its addition is now called helmet m/1879-1900-1928.
- The helmet m/1879-1900-1928 also got the straw wreath from the 2nd Cavalry (originally from "great battles", but nowadays said to be from the Battle of Lund) put under the chin strap on the right side of the helmet for soldiers. Officers still wear a yellow silk cockade.
- The straw wreath was also put on the forage cap for all ranks, under the cap button badge.
- The officer version of helmet m/1879-1900-1928 was added the chin strap from the 2nd Cavalry made of lion mascarons and embossed plates. This change was added on paper at the time, however not adapted until later on.

=== Changes since 1950s ===
The military ranks of the Swedish Armed Forces have undergone changes throughout the years. With the introduction of a two-officer-system in 2009 (which distinguished between tactical officers (OF-1/9) and specialist officers (OR-6/9)) the following innovations were made:

- Specialist officers now have a helmet plate in white enamel, while tactical officers still wear blue enamel (2009).
- Specialist officers' uniforms are based on that worn by sergeants.
- New epaulettes based on historic models have been reintroduced for specialist officers.
- One to three chevrons are used instead of diagonal stripes by lance corporals (OR-3), corporals (OR-4) and sergeants (OR-5) as of after 2009.
- The colour of the parade uniform worn by the cavalry was in the 1950s changed to match the officer's "mid-blue" shade: (a slightly lighter colour) for all ranks. In the 1990s the colour was again changed, apparently in error, to a royal blue colour. The shade for other ranks is now to revert to mid-blue, while officers will retain "middle blue, slightly lighter".
- Trouser (as opposed to riding breeches) have not historically been worn by other ranks, but only by officers when dismounted. Trousers for all ranks were however adopted in 1999, because of the increase in occasions on which Royal Guards were required to perform their duties on foot.
- A modern version of the early 19th century forage or stable cap was re-introduced for the infantry of the Life Guards in 2004/2005 and the cavalry in 2015. This headdress is of the same basic pattern as that worn by His Majesty The King's Guard of Norway.

== Colours, heraldry and traditions ==
=== Colours and standards ===
When a Swedish military unit, as regards traditions, is amalgamated with another, both colours will be carried together. In principle this will go on as long as both colours are usable. When one of the two (or more) no longer can be repaired, the unit will be granted a new colour. This new colour will reflect the traditions of both units without altering the prescribed model. Exceptions from this rule are, among others, the Life Guards which present both the colour of the former Svea Life Guards (I 1) and the standard of the former Life Guard Dragoons (K 1). For the Life Guards the colours will be white and show the Swedish Royal coat of arms without mantle. Kettledrum banners type B have a cloth moulded in two rows of flaps. The Life Guards is the only unit which may use kettledrum banners of this type and then only to kettledrums made of silver. The Dragoon Battalion of the Life Guards may use a white trumpet banner with three open crowns in the centre, placed two and one, all in gold. embroidered décor and a fringe made of gold thread.

==== Life Guards colour ====
The colour of the Life Guards was presented to the then Svea Life Guards and the Life Guards Brigade on 30 April 2000 by His Majesty the King Carl XVI Gustaf at the Stockholm Palace in connection with his birthday. It was used by the two units until the amalgamation with the Life Guard Dragoons (K 1) on 1 July 2000. The colour is also carried by the Guards Battalion of the Life Guards. The colour is drawn by Bengt Olof Kälde and embroidered by hand in insertion technique by Maj-Britt Salander/company Blå Kusten. Blazon: "On white cloth in the centre the greater coat of arms of Sweden as to the law without mantle. In each corner a royal crown proper with red lining. Battle honours (Swedish War of Liberation 1521, Rhine 1631, Lützen 1632, Warsaw 1656, Tåget över Bält 1658, Halmstad 1676, Lund 1676, Landskrona 1677, Narva 1700, Düna 1701, Kliszów 1702, Holowczyn 1708, Svensksund 1790) in yellow horizontally placed above and below the coat of arms."

In 2016, the Swedish Armed Forces decided to manufacture a new colour based on the motif of the old colour and that it be ordered according to regular routines with the National Swedish Museums of Military History (SFHM) with Swedish Army Museum as supplier. The reason for ordering a new colour was that the regiment has often participated in state ceremonial activities, which contributed to the wear and tear of the then current colour and the need for a new one. The new colour had the Friends of Handicraft as a subcontractor. The new colour was presented by His Majesty the King Carl XVI Gustaf on 24 November 2017 at the Inner Courtyard at Stockholm Palace. The 2017 colour has the same blazon as the 2000 colour.

==== Life Guards standard ====
The standard was presented to the then Life Guard Dragoons (K 1) at the regimental barracks in Stockholm by His Majesty the King Carl XVI Gustaf on 4 December 1995 - the regimental memorial day of the battle of Lund in 1676. It was used by the regiment until the amalgamation with the Svea Life Guards on 1 July 2000. The standard is also carried by the Dragoon Battalion of the Life Guards. The standard is drawn by Bengt Olof Kälde and embroidered by hand in insertion technique by Maj-Britt Salander/company Blå Kusten. Blazon: "On white cloth in the centre the Swedish Royal coat of arms as to the law without mantle. In each corner a royal crown proper with red lining. On the reverse battle honours (Lützen 1632, Lund 1676, Oldendorf 1633, Landskrona 1677, Wittstock 1636, Düna 1701, Leipzig 1642, Kliszów 1702, Warszawa 1656, Pultusk 1703, Fredriksodde 1658, Holowczyn 1708, Tåget över Bält 1658, Hälsingborg 1710, Halmstad 1676, Svensksund 1790) horizontally placed and in each corner three open crowns placed two and one (a legacy from the former Royal Life Regiment Dragoons, K 2), all yellow. White fringe." A new standard was presented by His Majesty the King Carl XVI Gustaf on 19 March 2014 at the Cavalry Barracks (Kavallerikasernen). The standard was made by Kristina Holmgård Semitjov, the same artist who made the 2016 colour of the Life Guards.

==== Life Company colour ====
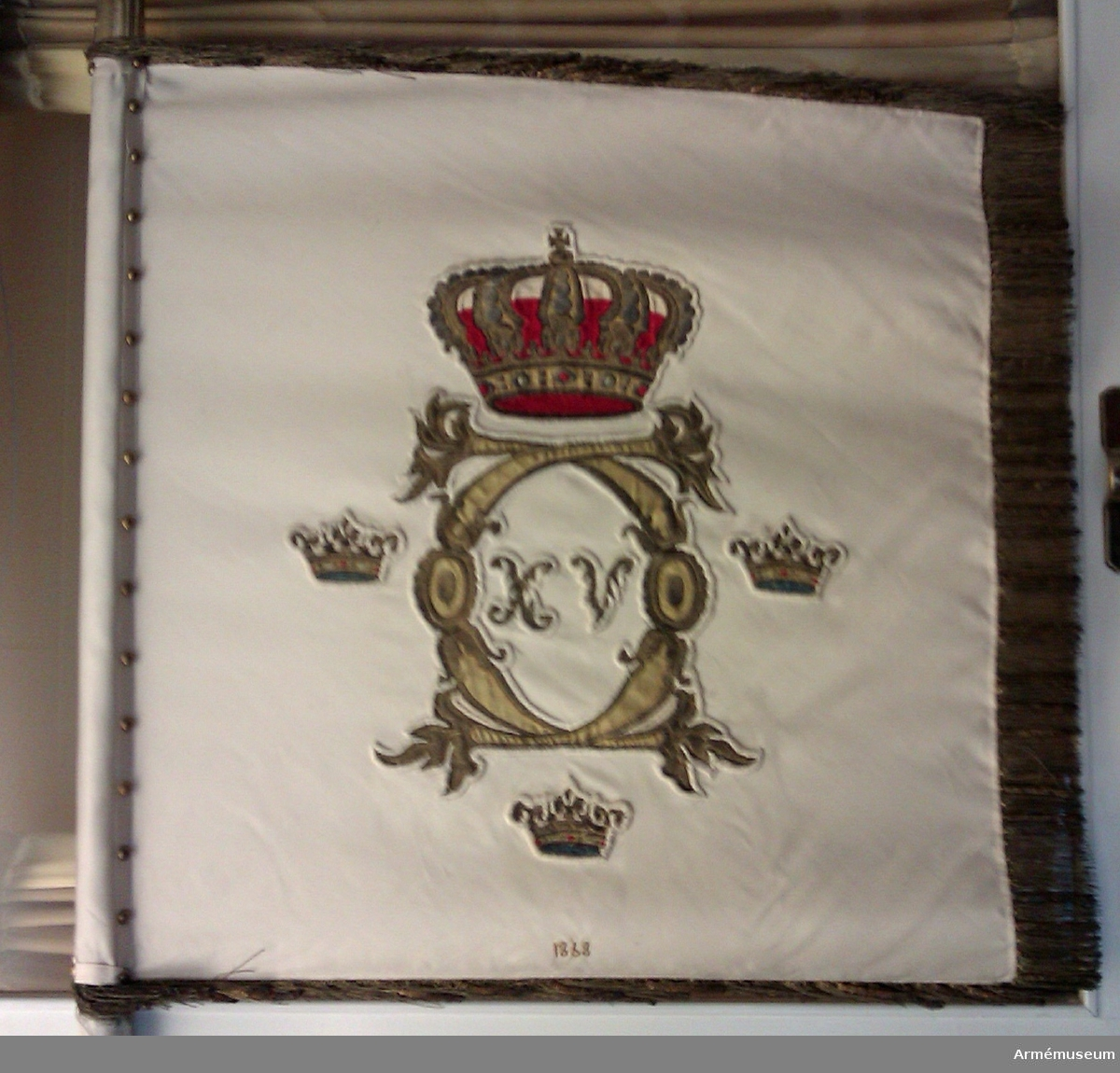
1868 colour of the Life Company

The colour of the Svea Life Guards' Life company was presented in 1868 by Her Majesty the Queen Lovisa who also embroidered it by hand together with her ladies-in-waiting. Blazon: "On white cloth in the centre the Royal monogram of His Majesty the King Charles XV between three open crowns, all yellow and with red lining in the crowns. Fringe of golden threads."

=== Coat of arms ===
The coat of the arms of the Life Guards. Blazon: "Azure, the lesser coat of arms of Sweden, three open crowns or placed two and one. The shield surmounted a musket bendwise and a rapier bendwise sinister in saltire, both argent and is surrounded by the chain of the Royal Order of the Seraphim, placed under crown, musket and rapier".

=== Medals ===
When the regiment was raised in 2000, the Livgardets (LG) förtjänstmedalj I ("Life Guards Medal of Merit I") in gold and silver (LGIGM/SM) of the 8th size was established. The medal ribbon is of yellow moiré with a white stripe on each side both followed on both sides by a blue line. His Majesty the King's monogram is attached to the ribbon. This medal was established in 1999 as the Svea livgardes (I 1) och Livgardesbrigadens (IB 1) förtjänstmedalj ("Svea Life Guards (I 1) and Life Guards Brigade (IB 1) Medal of Merit") (SvealivgLivgbrigGM/SM).

In 2001, Livgardets (LG) förtjänstmedalj II ("Life Guards (LG) Medal of Merit II") in gold and silver (LGIIGM/SM) was established. This medal was originally established in 1993 as the Livgardets dragoners (K 1) förtjänstmedalj ("Life Guard Dragoons (K 1) Medal of Merit") in gold and silver (LGDGM/SM). The medal was a Maltese cross and the medal ribbon was of blue moiré with a white stripe on each side. His Majesty the King's monogram in gold/silver is attached to the ribbon.

In 2004, Livgardets förtjänstmedalj III ("Life Guards Medal of Merit III") in gold and silver (LGIIIGM/SM) of the 8th size was established. The medalj ribbon of the gold medal is blue with two yellow lines on each side and a yellow stripe on the middle. The medal ribbon of the silver medal is yellow moiré with two blue lines on each side and a blue stripe on the middle. The obverse differs, however, this is due to the different units of the Life Guards.

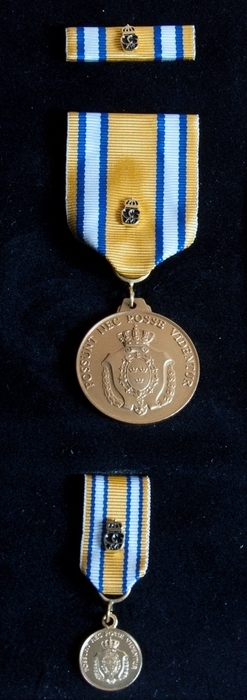
Medal, miniature medal and ribbon bar of Life Guards Medal of Merit I

Ribbon bar of Life Guards Medal of Merit II

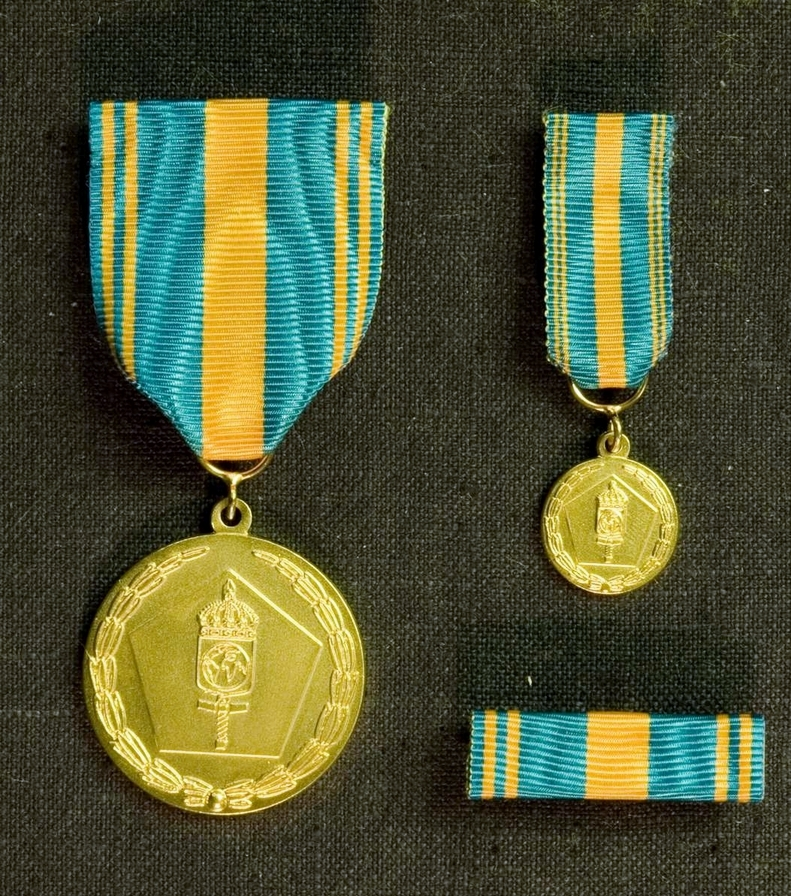
Medal, miniature medal and ribbon bar of Life Guards Medal of Merit III in gold

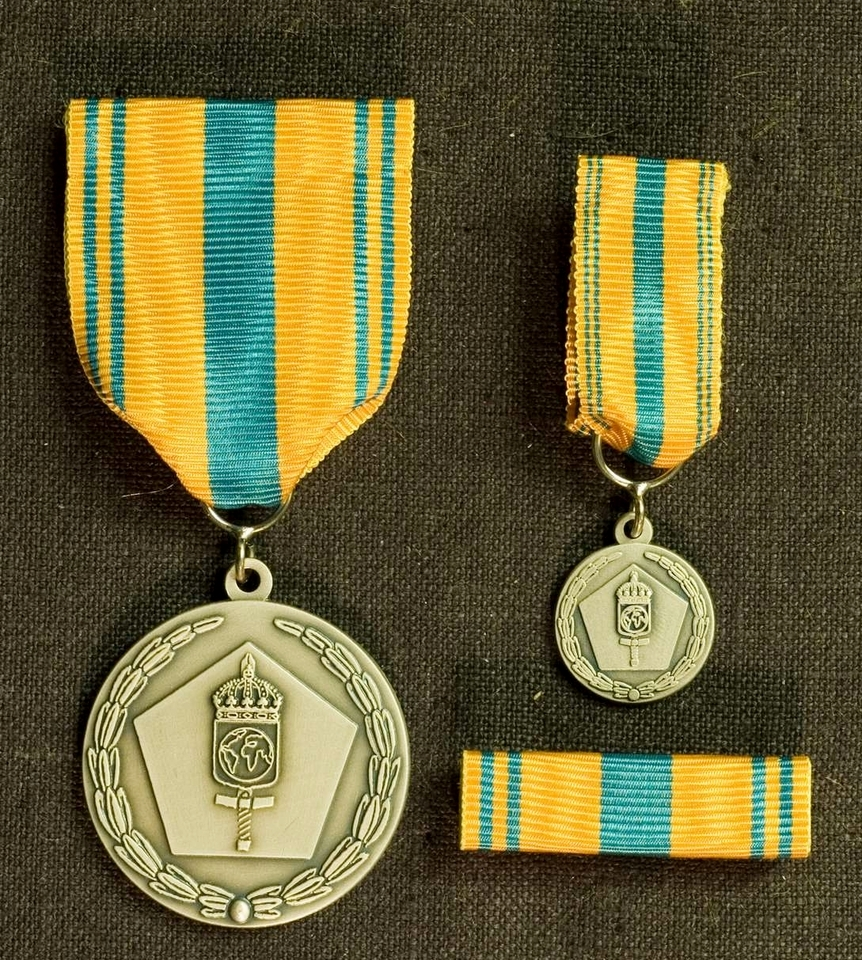
Medal, miniature medal and ribbon bar of Life Guards Medal of Merit III in silver

=== Heritage ===
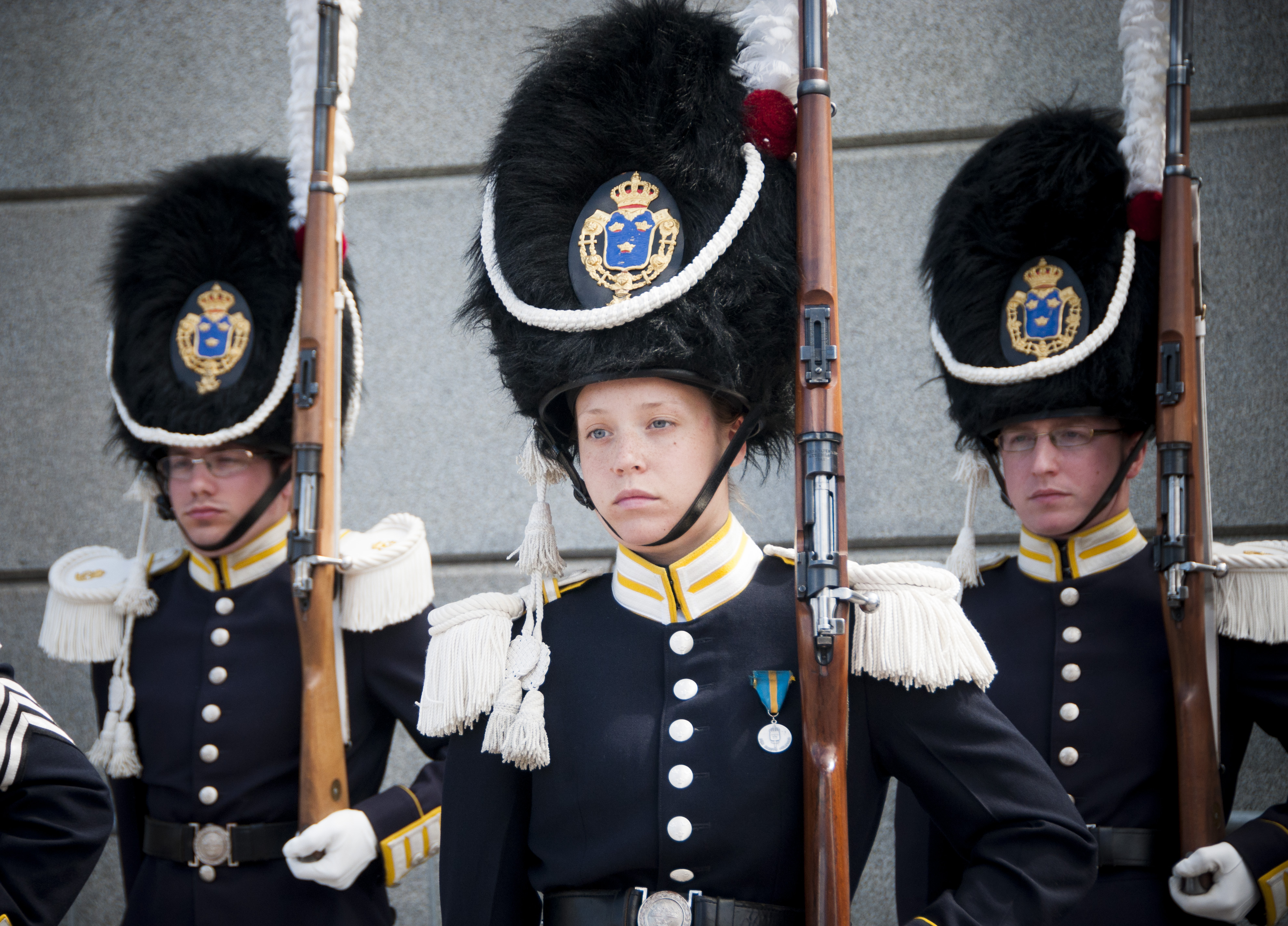
Grenadiers of the modern Swedish Life Guards wearing traditional ceremonial uniform.

The Life Guards continue the traditional heritage primarily of Svea Life Guards (I 1) Livkompaniet Light Mechanized Urban Warfare Infantry, Life Guard Dragoons (K 1) as well as the Swedish Armed Forces International Centre (Försvarsmaktens internationella centrum, SWEDINT) and the Swedish Armed Forces Music Centre (Försvarsmusikcentrum, FöMusC). Secondarily, the Life Guards carry today the traditional heritage of Royal guard duty, by the Livkompaniet Life Guards Infantry/Grenadiers Seen in the dark blue Uniform and of the Dragoonbattalion on Horse (K 1), Life Regiment Dragoons seen in the light blue uniform (K 2), Swedish Armed Forces UN School (FN-skolan), National Swedish Defence Dog Training Centre (Försvarets hundskola, HS) and the musical traditions of the Swedish Armed Forces Military Bands (Militärmusiken).

== Commanding officers ==
The King's role as Supreme Commander was abolished with the 1974 Instrument of Government. Since then, the King/Head of state is the chief representative of the Swedish Armed Forces (see Bill 1993/94:115). The King is traditionally also honorary Colonel-in-chief of the Life Guards (and the Life Regiment Hussars). From 2013 to 2017, the regimental commander was also the commanding officer of the Central Military Region. The commander of the Life Guards was from 2000 to 2017 also the Commandant of Stockholm. Previously, Defence District Commanders and also other regimental commanders in Stockholm Garrison have also served as Commandants of Stockholm. Today the billet of Commandant of the Life Guards is a standalone appointment, responsible for overall command of the regiment administratively.

=== Honorary Colonels-in-Chief ===
- 2000–20xx: Carl XVI Gustaf

=== Regimental commanders ===
- 2000–2002: Ingvar Hellquist
- 2002–2005: Kent Edberg
- 2005–2009: Svante Borg
- 2009–2014: Håkan Hedlund (Note: From 2013 also commander of Central Military Region.)
- 2014–2017: Christer Tistam (Note: Also commander of the Central Military Region. Tistam took command on 1 June 2014 with an appointment until 30 June 2018.)
- 2017–2020: Laura Swaan Wrede (Note: Swaan Wrede took command on 1 November 2017 with an appointment until 31 October 2021.)
- 2020–2024: Stefan Nacksten (Note: Nacksten took command on 1 June 2020 with an appointment until 31 May 2024.)
- 2024–20xx: Gustaf Dufberg (Note: Dufberg took command on 27 March 2024 with an appointment until 31 January 2024.)
- 2026–20xx: Rikard Daleke (Note: Daleke took command on 1 September 2026 with an appointment until 31 August 2029.)

== In popular culture ==
- Swedish heavy metal band Sabaton released a song on 26 February 2021 about the Life Guards in relation to the 500 year anniversary of the Life Guards as a tribute to the regiment. The song was originally released in Swedish. An English version named "The Royal Guard" released on 9 April 2021.

== Gallery ==
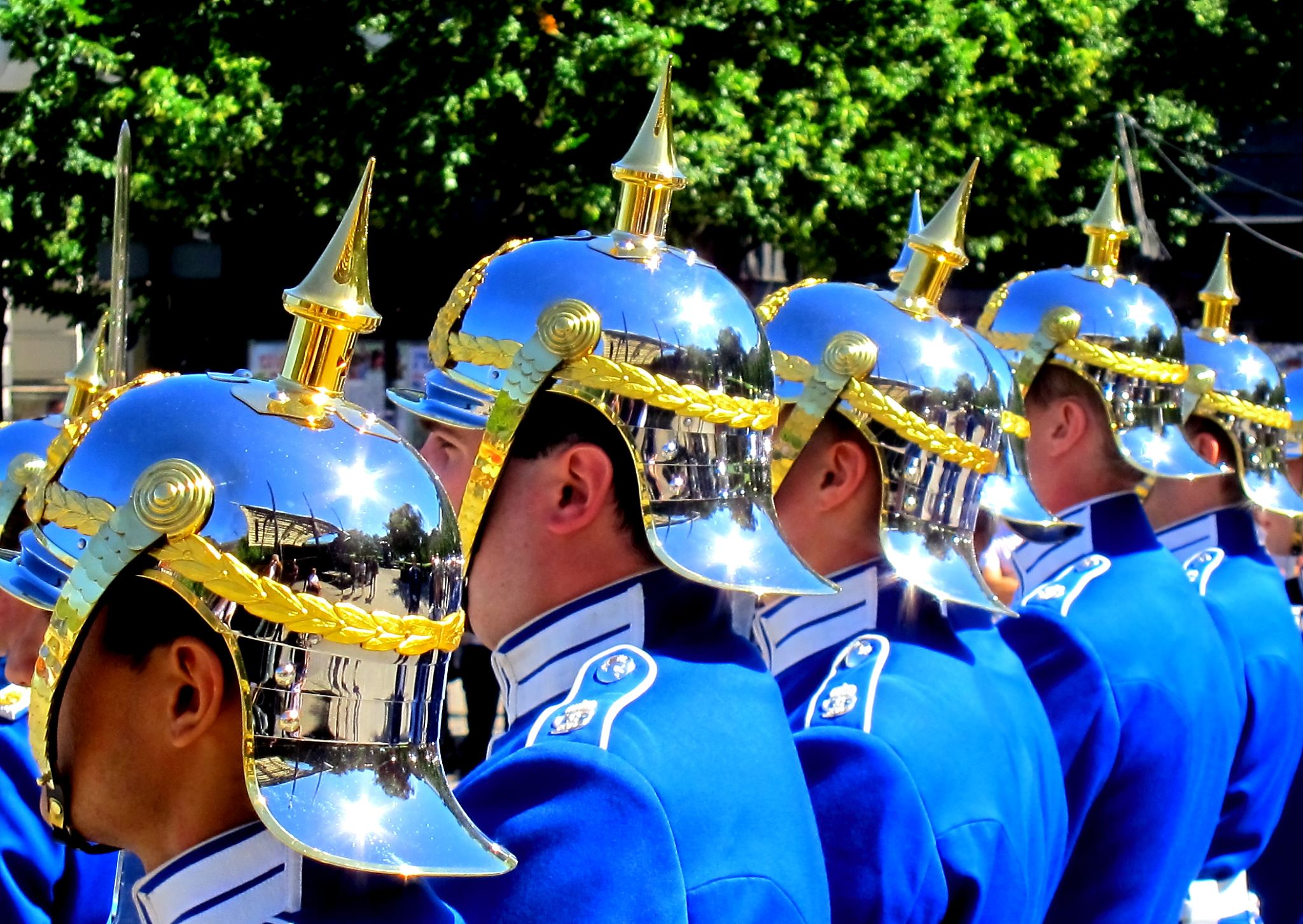
The Life Squadron with its silver-plated helmets and blue uniforms.

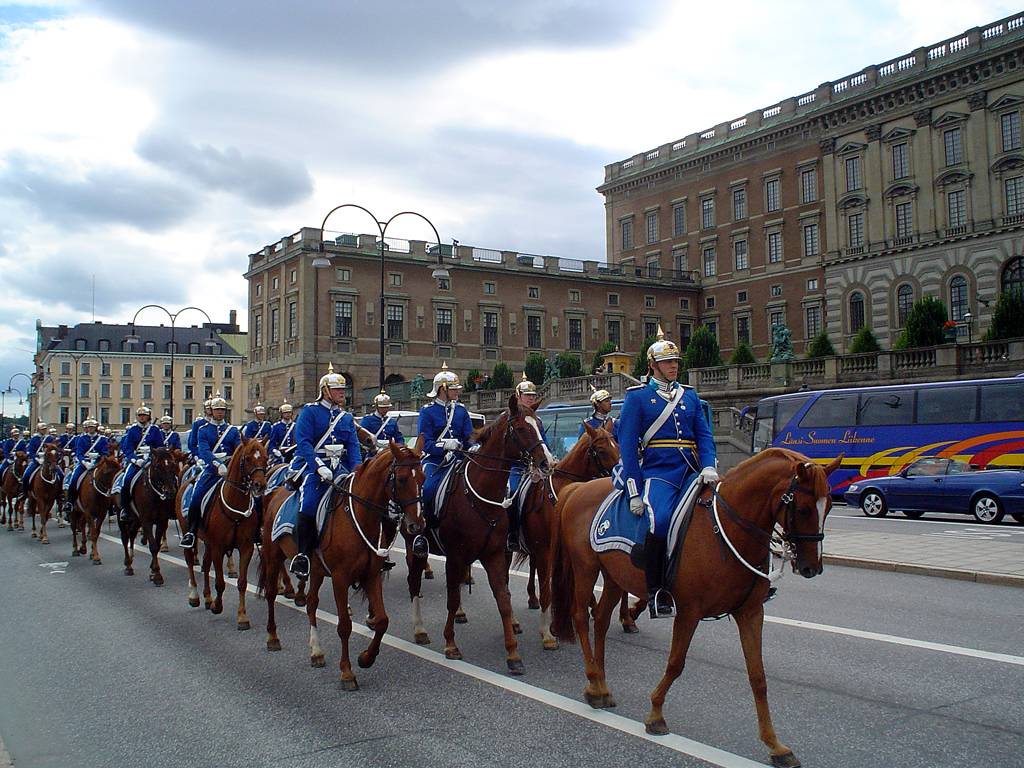
Mounted Changing of the Guard.

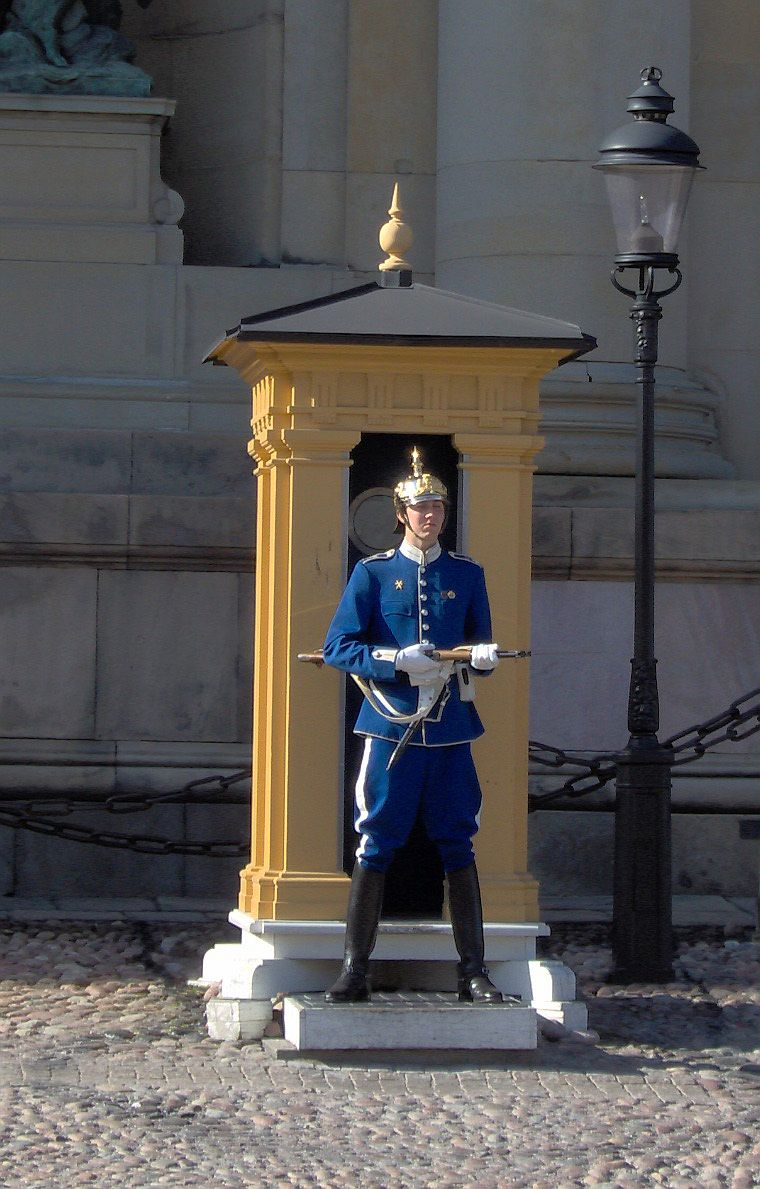
A dragoon standing sentry at the Royal Palace in Stockholm.

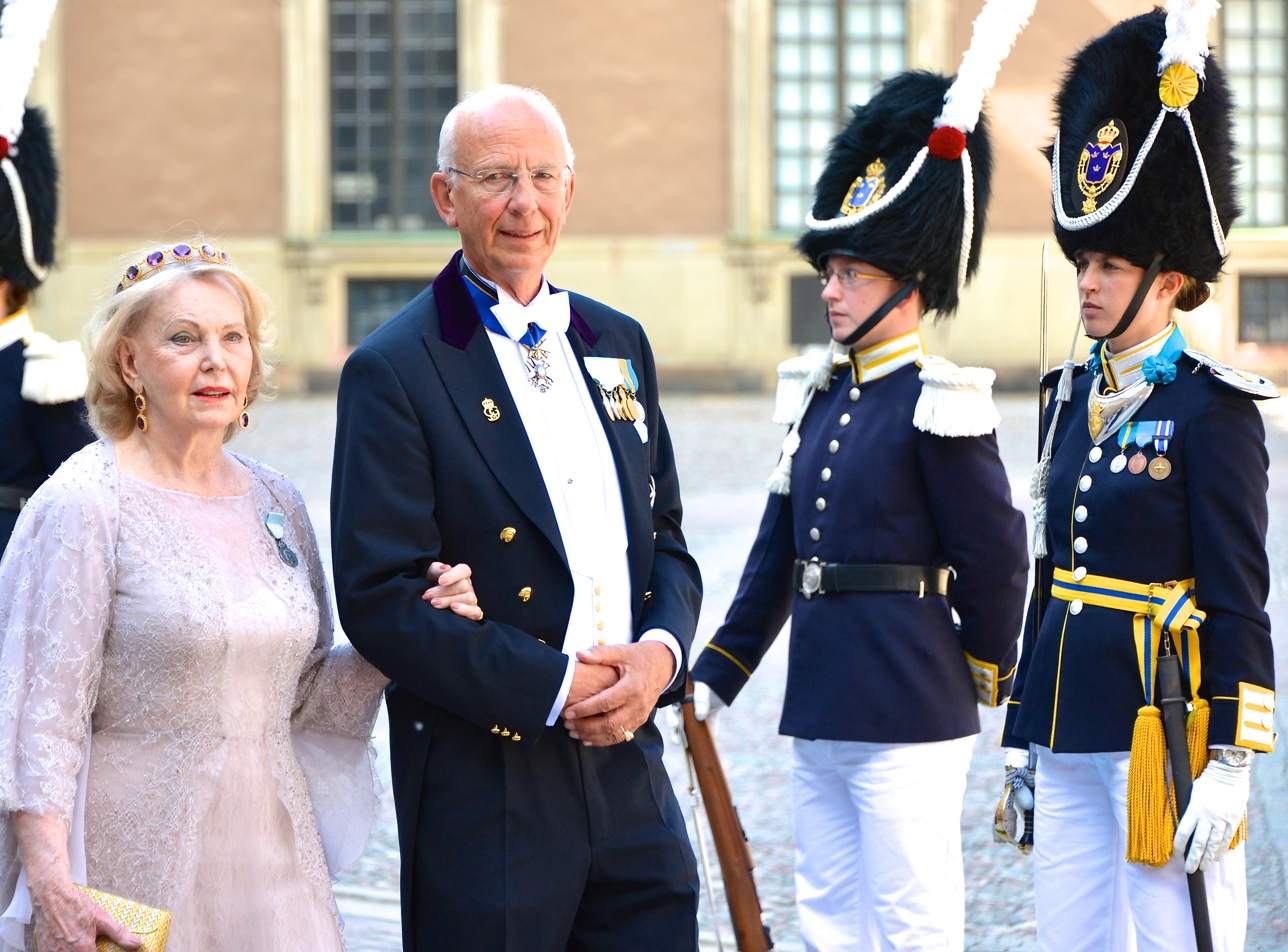
Grenadier Company standing guard of honour at the wedding of Princess Madeleine and Christopher O'Neill.

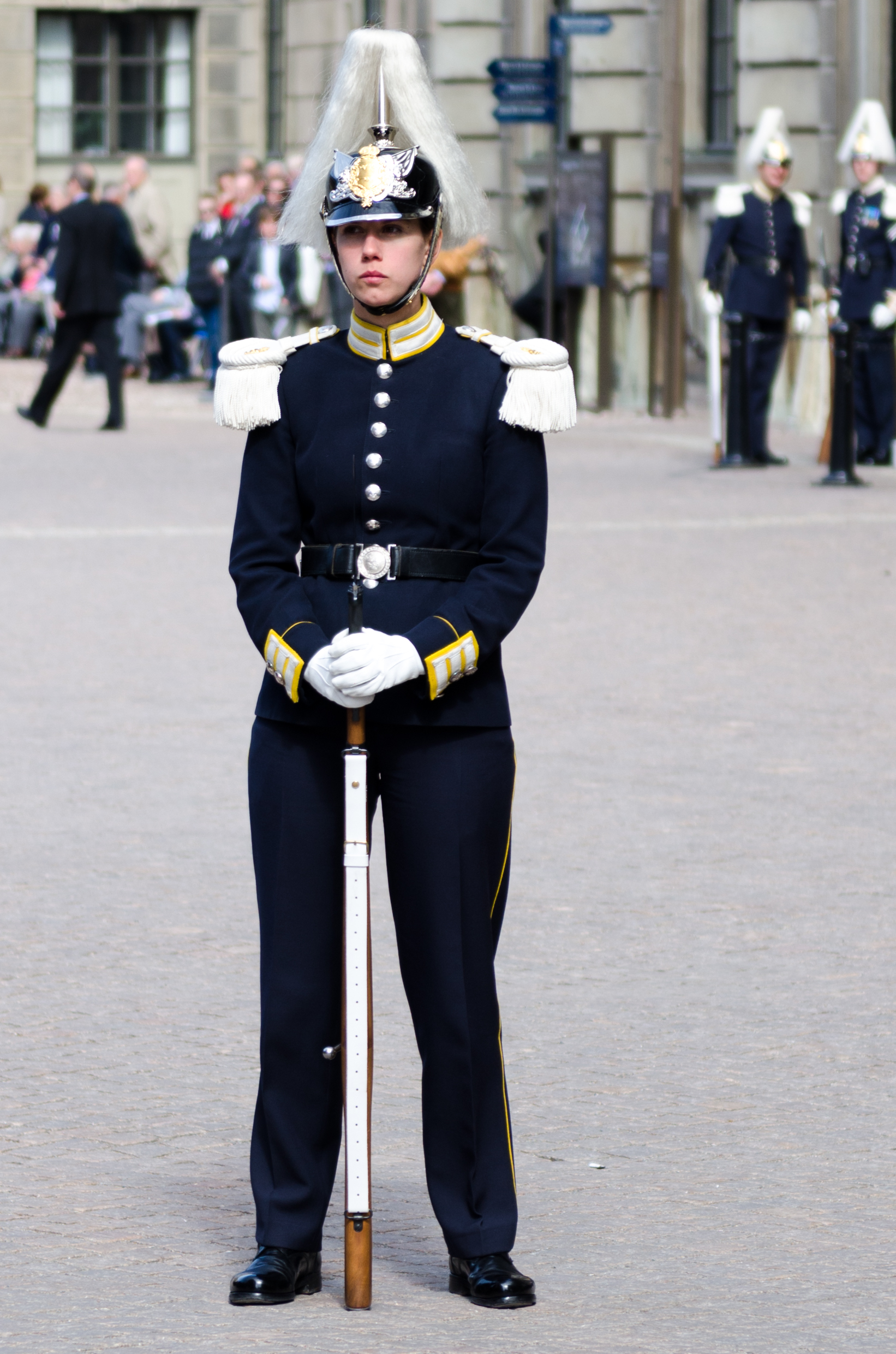
Female soldier from the Life Guards standing outside Stockholm Palace. 30 April 2012 (king's birthday).

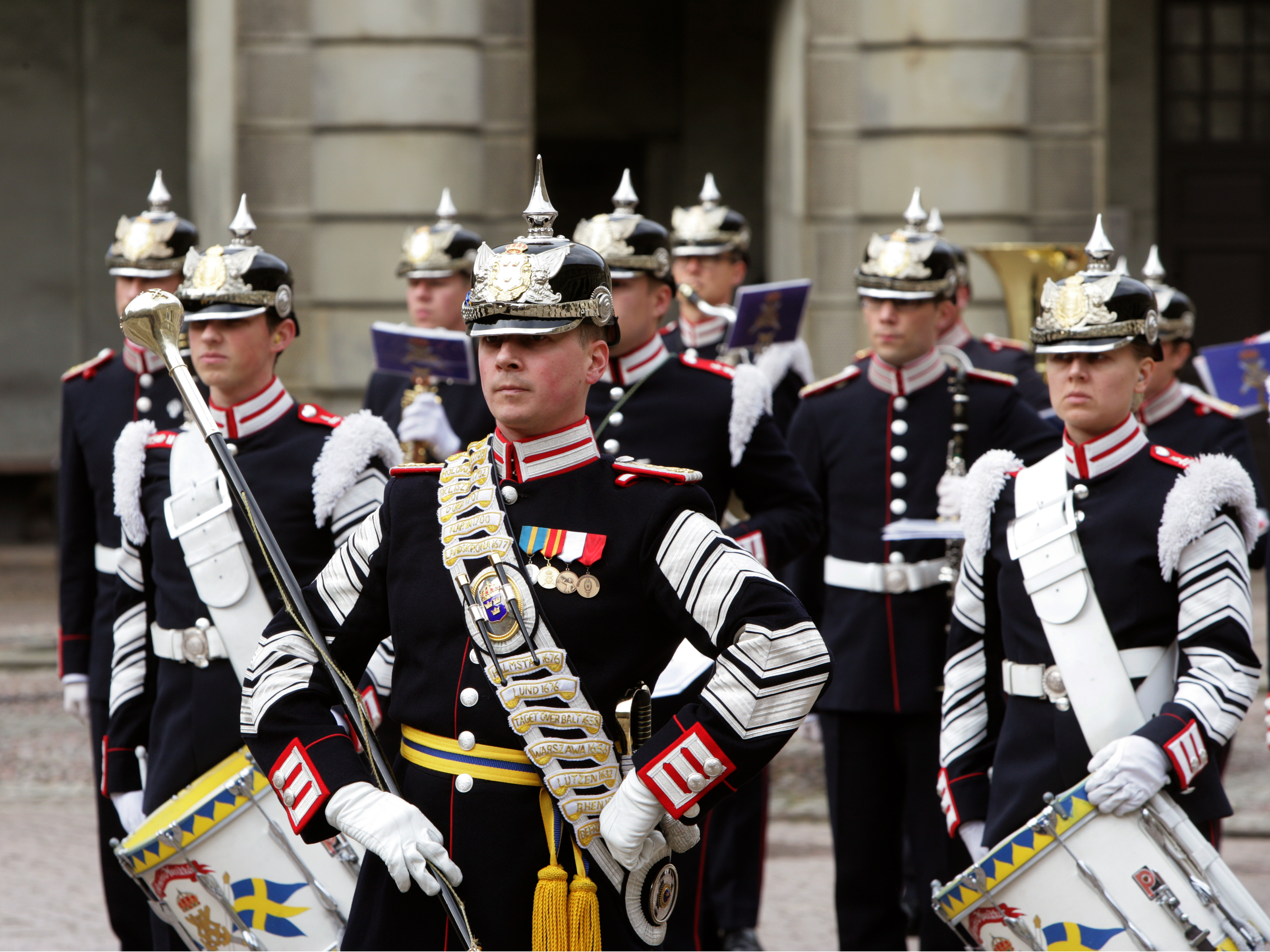
Regimental Drum Major of the Royal Swedish Army Band.

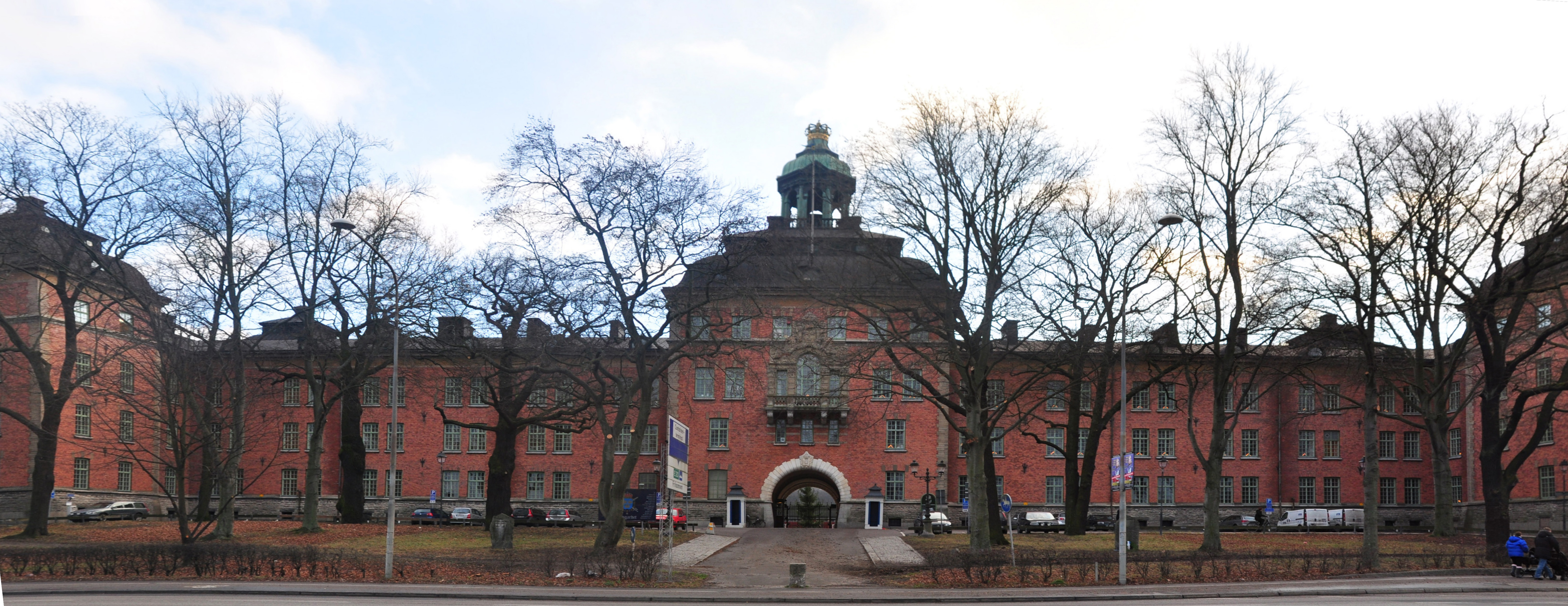
The Cavalry Barracks at Lidingövägen 28, Stockholm.

== See also ==
- Defence Act of 2000
- Svea Life Guards
- Life Guard Dragoons
- Royal Stables
