= Royal Swedish Army Band =

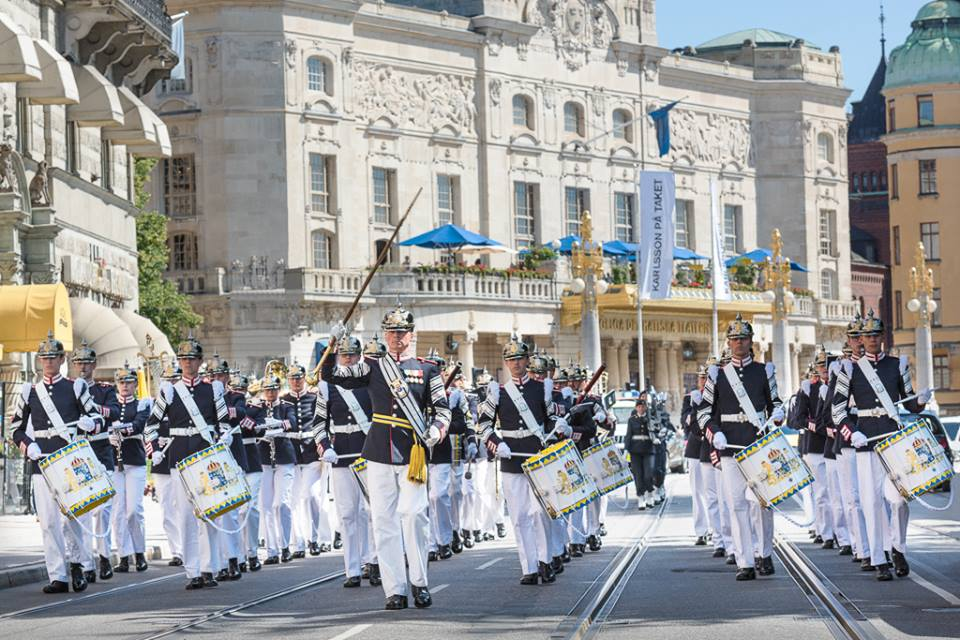
The band during the summer of 2016.

The Royal Swedish Army Band (Swedish: Arméns musikkår) is the largest professional military band in the Swedish Armed Forces. The establishment of 53 musicians and extensive musical versatility makes it possible to perform at most occasions, ceremonies, events, concerts and pageants. The band performs more than 200 times yearly. The band is a part of the Life Guards in Stockholm, and wears the uniform of the 2nd Regiment of Foot Guards 1886. The Swedish Armed Forces Music Corps heads all bands in the Swedish Armed Forces.

== Composition ==
The wind ensemble consists of: 3 flutes (the third doubling piccolo), 2 oboes, 2 bassoons, 1 clarinet in E-Flat, 8 clarinets in B-Flat, 1 bass clarinet in B-Flat, 2 alto saxophones, 1 tenor saxophone, 1 baritone saxophone, 5 French horns, 8 trumpets/cornets, trombones (3 tenor, 1 bass), 2 euphoniums, 3 tubas, a percussion section that includes 3 players, 6 military drummers and one double bass.

== Ensembles ==
The band has several ensembles available:

- Marching band
- Symphonic band
- Traditional swedish dance music ensemble
- Big band
- Serenade ensemble
- Wind octet
- Wind quintet

== Administration ==
- Commanding Officer – Warrant Officer II Erik Widegren
- Second-in-Command – Warrant Officer II, Vacant
- Director of Music – Vacant
- Drum Major WO I David Lindberg

== Events ==
The Band of the Royal Swedish Army plays regularly at many events, some of the more well known are listed below, although this is not a comprehensive list:

- State visits
- Changing of the King's Guard
- The King's birthday parade,
- Beating the Retreat
- Veteran's Day,
- Royal Pageants
- Opening of the Parliament
- National day (6 June)

The Band of the Royal Swedish Army regularly performs at Swedish regiments and has been deployed with the Swedish troops in Afghanistan and Kosovo. The orchestra also performs several concerts and at other non-military events throughout Sweden and other countries such as Norway, Denmark, Finland, Germany, Switzerland etc.

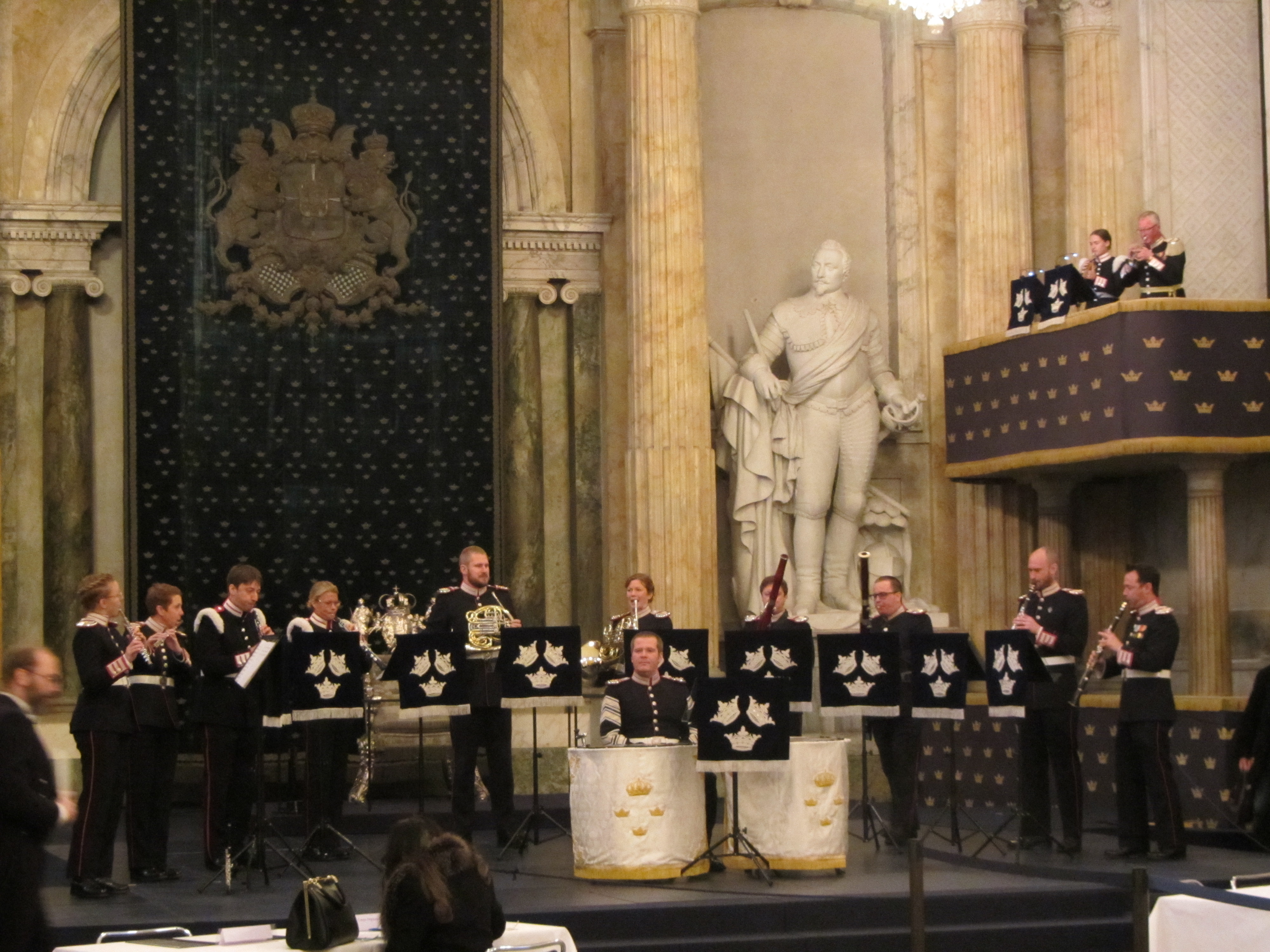
In the Royal Palace in Stockholm

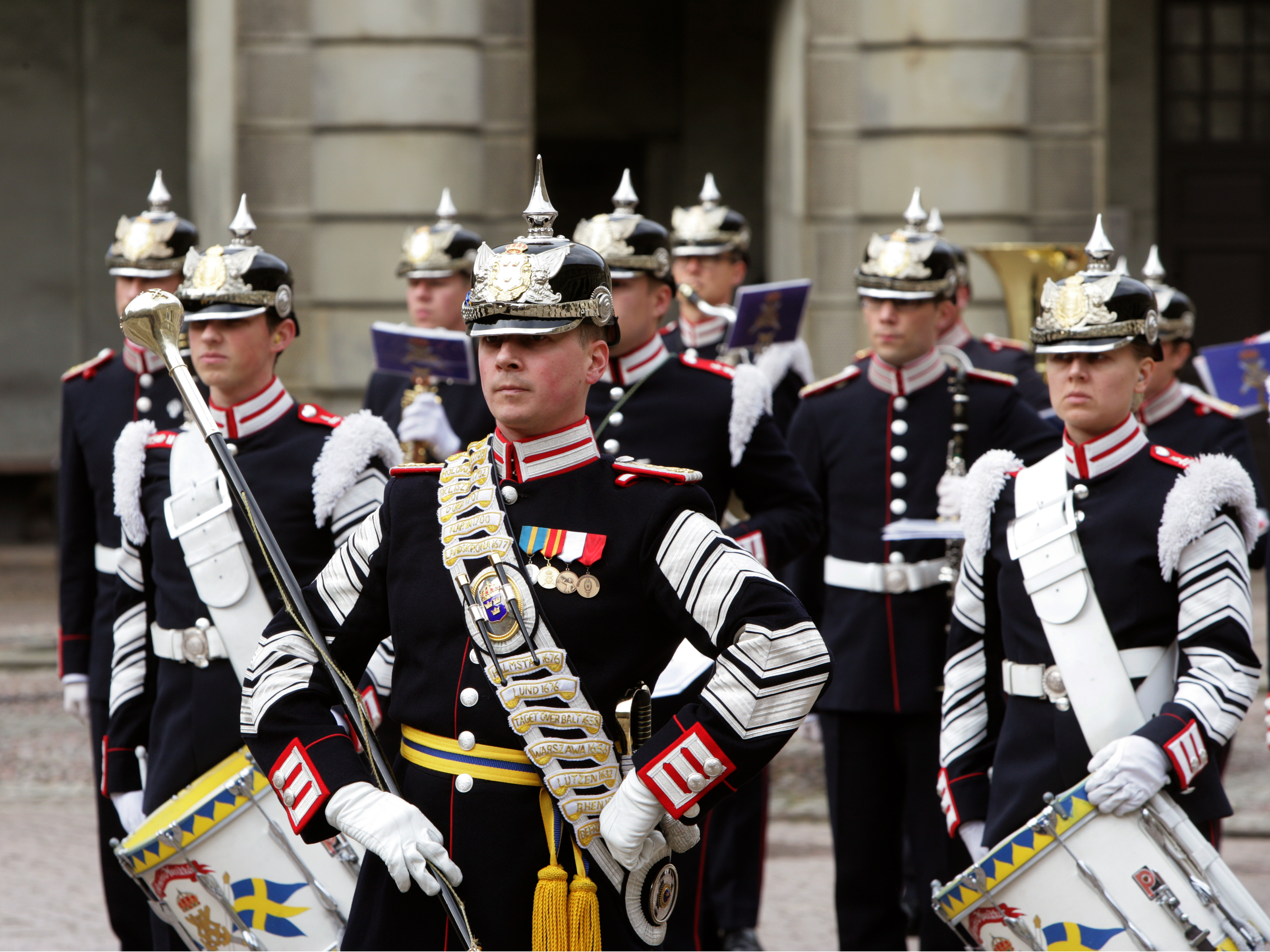
The drum-major 2017

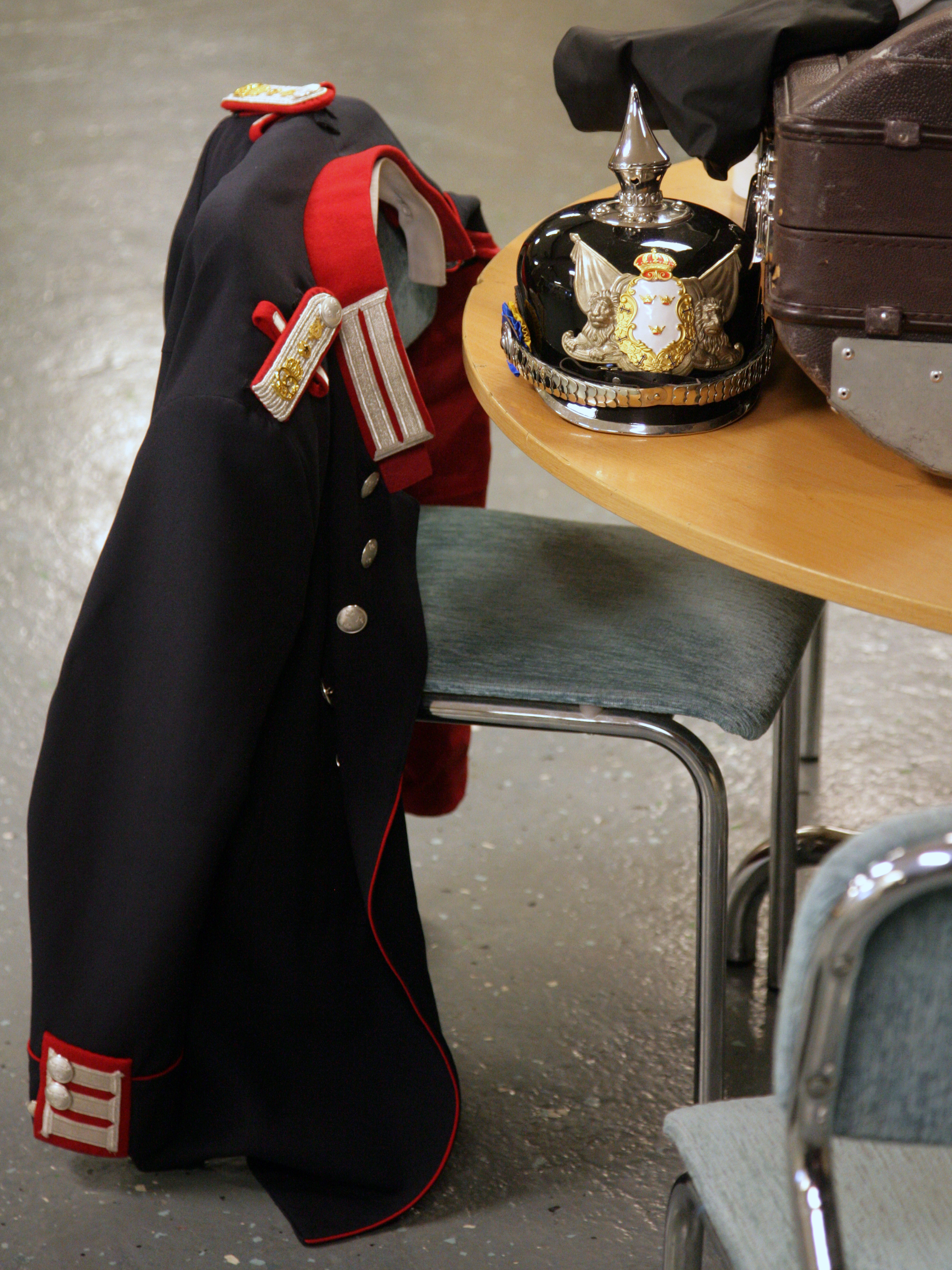
Uniform m1885 WO I

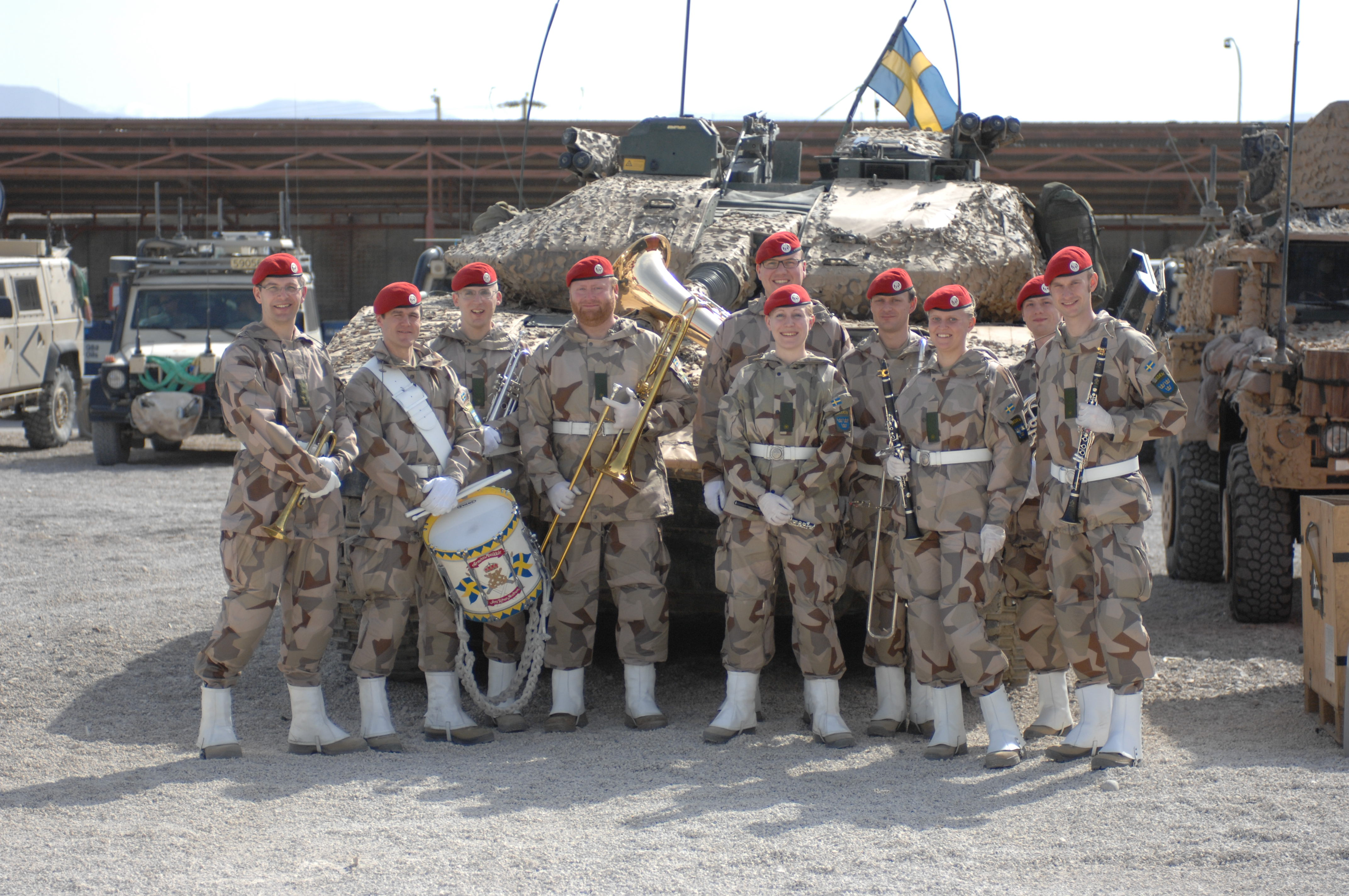
Afghanistan 2013

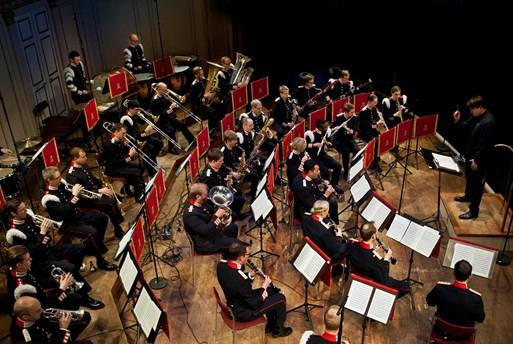
On stage.

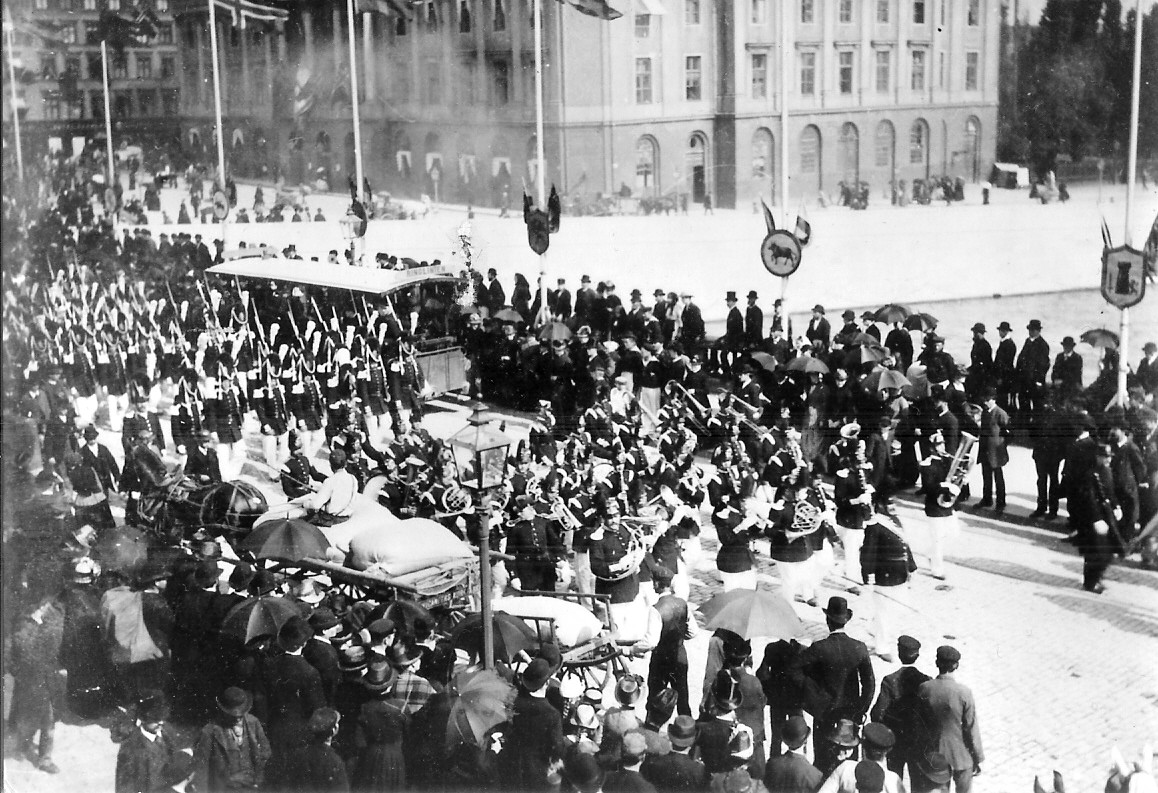
Band and Grenadiers 1870

== Discography ==
- Konsert med Arméns musikpluton 1982, Arméns Musikpluton 1982, dirigent Torgny Hanson, soloist Håkan Hardenberger, Prophone LP PROP 9925 (1984).
- Under blågul fana, Arméns musikpluton 1984, dirigenter Torgny Hanson och Harry Sernklef, Proprius LP PROP 9945 (1985).
- På parad och estrad, Arméns musikpluton 1985, dirigent Ulf Sigurdson, Proprius LP PROP 9950 (1986).
- Sound of Brass, Arméns musikpluton 1988, dirigent Torgny Hanson, soloist Daniel Kåse (slagverk), Proprius PRCD 9018 (1989).
- Festival of Brass (Festspel), Arméns musikpluton 1989, dirigent Mats Janhagen, soloist Andreas Hanson (kornett), Proprius PRCD 9045 (1990).
- Världens marscher (Great Marches of the World), Arméns musikpluton 1990, dirigent Mats Janhagen, Serpent SERCD 901 (nyutgåva 1997).
- A Touch of Sweden, Arméns musikpluton 1991, dirigent Mats Janhagen, solister Sonny Wallentin (sång), Olle Hermansen (ess-kornett), Proprius PRCD 9065 (1992).
- Flygvapnets marscher (Swedish Air Force Marches), Arméns musikpluton 1992, dirigent Mats Janhagen, Serpent SERCD 1 (engelskspråkig utgåva: SERCD 1 E) (1993)
- I parad, på konsert, Arméns musikkår 1994, dirigent Mats Janhagen, Serpent SERCD 6 (1995).
- Musique Royale, Arméns musikkår 1995 (skiva tillägnad Carl XVI Gustaf på hans 50-årsdag), dirigent Mats Janhagen, Serpent SERCD 9 (1996).
- On Tour 1996, Arméns musikkår 1996 (liveinspelningar), dirigent Mats Janhagen, soloist Andreas Sundén (klarinett), Serpent SERCD 14 (1997).
- Scandinavian Winds, Arméns musikkår 1997, dirigent Mats Janhagen, Serpent SERCD 16 (1998).
- Vaktparad, Arméns musikkår 1998 (några spår spelas av Arméns Musikkår 1996), dirigent Mats Janhagen, Serpent SERCD 17 (1999).
- The Best of the ’99 Concerts, Arméns musikkår 1999 (liveinspelningar), dirigent Mats Janhagen, Serpent SERCD 19 (2000).
- La danza, Arméns musikkår 2000, dirigent Mats Janhagen, Serpent SERCD 22 (2001).
- Musik & tradition, Arméns musikkår 2002, ensemble ur Svea Livgardes Musikkår, sångare ur Orphei Drängar, dirigent Mats Janhagen, Serpent SERCD 25 (2003).
- Great Swedish Marches, vol. 1, Arméns musikkår 2003 och Arméns musikkår 2004, dirigent Mats Janhagen, Serpent SERCD 27 (2005).
- Prayer for Peace, Arméns musikkår (skiva tillägnad 60 år av fredsbevarande missioner, gåvoexemplar), sång: Gunilla Backman och Anders Ekborg, dirigent Mats Janhagen, Serpent SERCD 34 (2014).
- Julmusik på Kungliga Slottet/Christmas Music at the Royal Palace. Arméns Musikkår 2013, dirigent Mats Janhagen och Mary Ljungqvist-Hehn, Solister: Miah Persson, sopran, Karl-Magnus Fredriksson, baryton jämte Kungliga Slottets vokalensembler.
