= Swedish Armed Forces Music Corps =

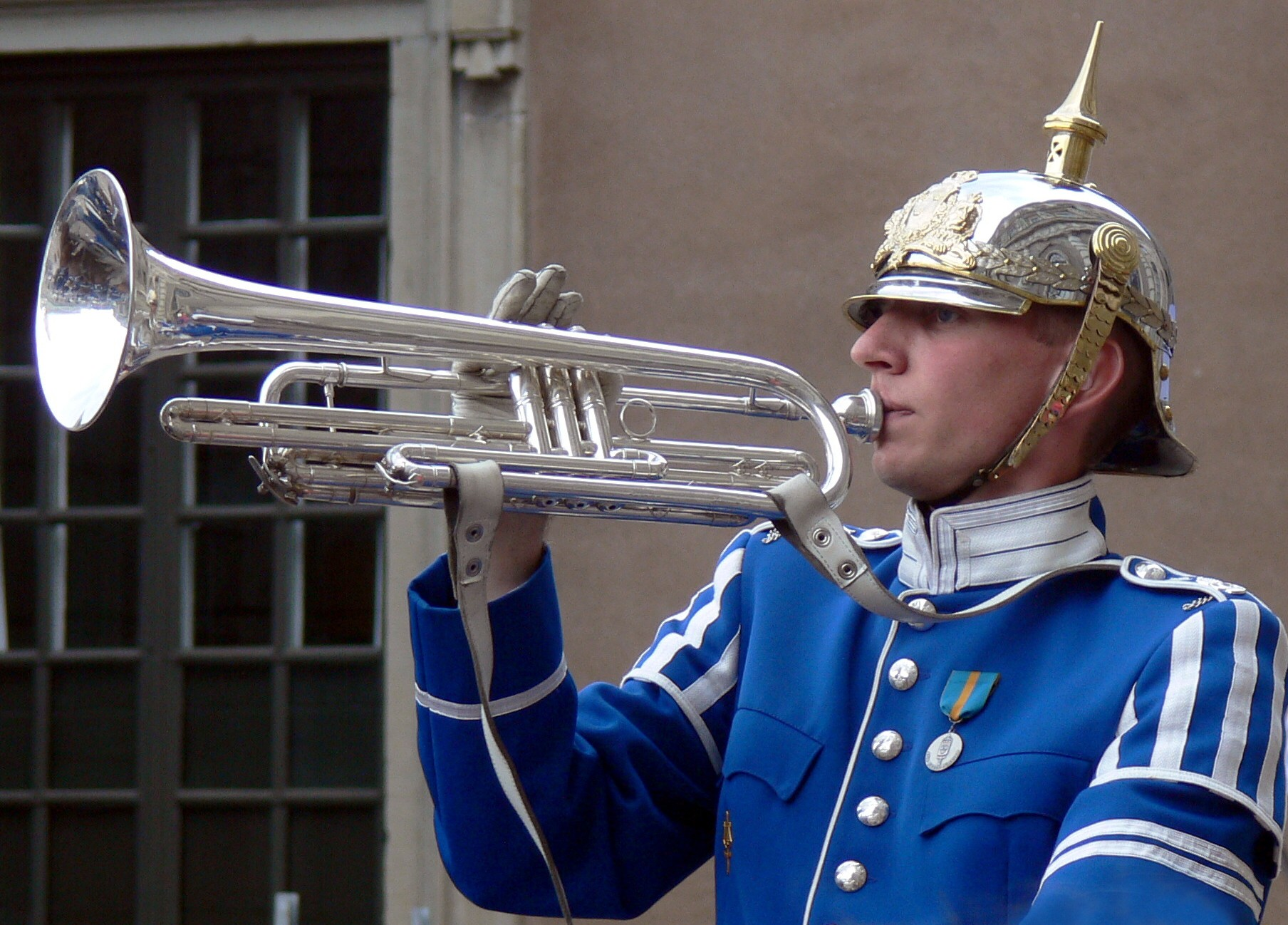
A Swedish band member

The Swedish Armed Forces Music Corps (Swedish: Försvarsmusiken, FöMus) heads all bands of the Swedish Armed Forces: the Royal Swedish Army Band, the Life Guards' Dragoon Music Corps and the Royal Swedish Navy Band in Karlskrona and the 25 bands of the Home Guard. Försvarsmusiken serves the Royal Court, Armed Forces and the Government.

It was organized in 2010 as a combined staff of three professional military bands under the armed forces. The MMD-SAF reports as part of the Life Guards, headquartered in Stockholm. The official marchpast for musicians under the FöMus is Signalmarsch No. 1 by Mats Janhagen.

== Directors ==
- 2010–2015: Olle Hermansen
- 2015–present: Roger Lodin

== See also ==
- Music Branch (Canadian Forces)
- Forsvarets musikk
- Military Band Service of the Armed Forces of Russia

== Sources ==
- Försvarsmusiken
- Hemvärnets musikkårer
