= List of oldest military units and formations in continuous operation =

While modern standing armies were first developed in the 15th century, the defining terminology for contemporary military units and formations, such as company, battalion, regiment etc. mostly arose in the early modern period, during the 16th and 17th centuries.

Only units that are still extant are included, while contemporary refounding of older units are excluded.

== Oldest active military units still in operation ==
Start of continuous operation	Heraldry	Name	Founder	Founding location	Current location	Notes	Ref.
1147		Portuguese Army	Afonso I of Portugal	Kingdom of Portugal	Lisbon, Portugal	The origins of the Portuguese Army are traditionally traced to 1147, during the reign of King Afonso I, particularly following the Siege of Lisbon in the Reconquista. The military forces organized under the Portuguese Crown during this period formed the basis of the permanent royal army that evolved into the modern Portuguese Army, one of the oldest military institutions in continuous national service in Europe.	
1248		Infantry Regiment "Inmemorial del Rey" No. 1	Ferdinand III of Castile	Crown of Castile	Madrid, Spain	It was one of the first standing units in Europe since the fall of the Western Roman Empire, remaining in the order of battle of the Castilian and Spanish armies since its creation. At present the regiment is the unit responsible for providing the central seat of Spanish Army Headquarters security, services, and support needed for its functioning.	
1317		Portuguese Navy	Denis of Portugal	Kingdom of Portugal	Lisbon, Portugal	The oldest continuously serving navy in the world, founded on February 1, 1317, when King Denis of Portugal appointed Manuel Pessanha to serve as the Admiral of Portugal.	
1479		1st Infantry Regiment	King Louis XI	Kingdom of France	Sarrebourg, France	Founded in 1479-1480 by King Louis XI as Bandes de Picardie. It became the Légion de Picardie in 1558 during the Italian War of 1551–1559 and then Régiment de Picardie on May 29, 1569. It was ultimately renamed 1^{er} régiment d'infanterie de ligne in 1791 after the military reforms of Louis Le Bègue Duportail. It is now part of the Franco-German Brigade (French units of the brigade are part of 1st Division) and was recently deployed in Afghanistan, Mali, and the Central African Republic.	
1485	Badge of the Yeomen of the Guard	Yeomen of the Guard	King Henry VII	Kingdom of England	St. James's Palace, London, United Kingdom	The King's Body Guard of the Yeomen of the Guard is a bodyguard of the British Monarch. The oldest British military corps still in existence, it was created by King Henry VII in 1485 after the Battle of Bosworth Field. The Yeomen today are purely ceremonial, and perform ceremonial and royal duties at State Opening of Parliament, The Most Noble Order of the Garter, Maundy Service, Royal Garden Parties, Investitures, Coronations, plus other events such as Royal Weddings and Royal Funerals, Epiphany, State Visits and Diplomatic Receptions. They are all based and administered from St James's Palace.	
1488		Royal Netherlands Navy	Maximilian I	Habsburg Netherlands	Kingdom of the Netherlands	Maximilian I issues a Statute of Admiralty in 1488, laying the foundations for the current Royal Netherlands Navy.	
1506		Pontifical Swiss Guard	Pope Julius II	Papal States	Vatican City	Pope Julius II asks the Swiss Diet to provide him with a constant corps of 200 Swiss mercenaries.	
1509		Infantry Regiment "Soria" No. 9	Ferdinand II of Aragon	Kingdom of Naples	Fuerteventura, Spain	Founded in 1509 as "Tercio of Napoli" or "Tercio de Zamudio". It is the second oldest regiment still used for overseas military operations.	
1521		Life Guards	King Gustav Vasa	Sweden	(Sweden) Kungsängen	Founded in 1521 as the Royal bodyguards to Gustav Vasa.	
1522		Swedish navy	King Gustav Vasa	Sweden Sweden	Sweden	On 7 June 1522, one year after the separation of Sweden from the Kalmar Union, Gustav Vasa purchased a number of ships from the Hanseatic town of Lübeck	
1534		Tercio Viejo de Sicilia	Charles I of Sicily	Kingdom of Sicily	San Sebastián and Irun, Kingdom of Spain	Founded in 1534 to control the possessions the Kings of Sicily who at that time resided abroad, the tercio participated in numerous battles including the battle of Lepanto. In recent years, its units have participated in international missions in Bosnia Herzegovina, Lebanon, Kosovo, Iraq, and Afghanistan.	
1537		Spanish Marine Infantry	Charles V, Holy Roman Emperor	Crown of Castile	San Fernando, Spain	Founded on 27 February 1537 when Old Sea Companies of Naples were permanently assigned to Mediterranean Galley Squadrons.	
1537		Honourable Artillery Company	King Henry VIII	Kingdom of England	City of London, United Kingdom	Incorporated by Royal Charter in August 1537 by King Henry VIII as the Fraternity or Guild of Artillery of Longbows, Crossbows and Handguns. Fought with distinction in both World Wars. The oldest surviving regiment in the British Army (now part of the Army Reserve).	
1546		Royal Navy	King Henry VIII	Kingdom of England	City of London, United Kingdom	The Royal Navy (RN) is the naval warfare force of the United Kingdom. Although warships were used by English and Scottish kings from the early medieval period, the first major maritime engagements were fought in the Hundred Years' War against France. The modern Royal Navy traces its origins to the English Navy of the early 16th century; the oldest of the UK's armed services, it is consequently known as the Senior Service.	
1556		2nd Dragoon Regiment	Louis I, Prince of Condé	Kingdom of France	France	Despite the recent formation of the regiment in its current configuration, it is the oldest French cavalry regiment, dating back to 1556. The French Revolution gave it the designation of the second regiment of dragoons in the French Army, and with brief interruptions it has served under this name in successive French armies ever since. It is the French Army NBC Defense Unit. Still in Service.	
1614		Guard Hussar Regiment	King Christian IV	Denmark–Norway	Denmark	Unit amalgamated with and perpetuates Zealand Life Regiment, which was disbanded on 1 January 2001	
1624		Skaraborg Regiment	King Gustav II Adolf	(yes) Swedish Empire	Sweden	The regiment traces its origins to the 16th century and a grand regiment formed in 1613 which was split into the Skaraborg Regiment and the now disbanded Älvsborg Regiment and Västgöta-Dal Regiment in the early 1620’s.	
1625		Dalarna Regiment	King Gustav II Adolf	(yes) Swedish Empire	Sweden	Current formation from 2021; traces its origins to fänikor raised in 1542 and became part of a grand regiment, Uppland Grand Regiment, formed in 1615 but became a separate regiment in 1625.	
1626		Pori Brigade	King Gustav II Adolf	(yes) Swedish Empire	Finland	On 16 February 1626, King Gustav II Adolf of Sweden founded the Royal Pori Regiment during the Thirty Years' War. The regiment served in most wars of the great power era of Sweden, and was destroyed and reformed several times during the Great Northern War.	
1636		181st Infantry Regiment		(Kingdom of England) Colony of Massachusetts Bay	Massachusetts (United States)	Part of the Massachusetts National Guard	
1636		182nd Infantry Regiment		(Kingdom of England) Colony of Massachusetts Bay	Massachusetts (United States)	Part of the Massachusetts National Guard	
1636		101st Field Artillery Regiment		(Kingdom of England) Colony of Massachusetts Bay	Massachusetts (United States)	Oldest field artillery unit in the United States Army and Massachusetts National Guard. The 101st FA was an infantry unit until 1897.	
1642		Scots Guards (third regiment of foot guards)	King Charles I	Kingdom of Scotland	United Kingdom	Raised in 1642 to form a personal body guard to King Charles I when he campaigned in Ireland; became part of English Army in 1661	
1646		Norrland Dragoon Regiment	Queen Christina	(yes) Swedish Empire	Sweden	The regiment traces its origins to the Ångermanland, Medelpad and Jämtland Regiment raised in 1646, renamed Jämtland Dragoon Regiment in 1689 but with only one semi-separate company of cavalry which was later reorganized as a regiment. It received its current name in 1892.	
1648		Danish Artillery Regiment		Denmark–Norway	Denmark	Current formation from 2019; traces origins back to 1648.	
1650		Coldstream Guards	George Monck, 1st Duke of Albemarle	Commonwealth of England	United Kingdom	Raised in 1650; became part of the English Army in 1661.	
1656	Grenadier Guards Royal Cypher	Grenadier Guards	Thomas Wentworth, 5th Baron Wentworth, John Russell	Commonwealth of England	United Kingdom	Senior Regiment of the Guards Division	
1658		Royal Life Guards	King Frederick III	Denmark–Norway	Denmark	Both a Guard/Ceremonial unit of the Danish Monarch and Infantry Regiment of the Danish Army	
1659		1st Regiment "Granatieri di Sardegna"	Duke Carlo Emanuele II di Savoia	Duchy of Savoy	Italy	Formed April 18, 1659 as the "Reggimento delle Guardie"	
1664		Royal Marines	King James II	Kingdom of England	United Kingdom	Now roughly brigade size.	
1665		Korps Mariniers	Johan de Witt and admiral Michiel de Ruyter	Dutch Republic	Kingdom of the Netherlands	The Korps Mariniers was raised as the Regiment de marine during the second Anglo-Dutch War. Today it is roughly 3 battalions strong.	
1670		Jämtland Ranger Corps	King Charles XI	(yes) Swedish Empire	Sweden	Current formation from 2021; the Jämtland Ranger Corps shares its origin in the Ångermanland, Medelpad and Jämtland regiment with the Norrland Dragoon Regiment.	
1670		Jutland Dragoon Regiment	Field marshal Ernst Albrecht von Eberstein	Denmark–Norway	Denmark		
1670		South Carolina State Guard		(Kingdom of England) Province of South Carolina	South Carolina (United States)	Founded in 1670 as the Charleston Militia. Served in Revolutionary War, War with Mexico, Spanish-American War. Later "South Carolina State Defense Force" (c. 1941), renamed "South Carolina State Guard" (1944).	
1699	2º BIMtz	2nd Motorized Infantry Battalion	Peter II of Portugal	Principality of Brazil	Brazil	The 2nd Motorized Infantry Battalion, originated from the royal charter of September 29, 1699, when four companies of infantrymen arrived in the city of Rio de Janeiro from Lisbon. These companies formed The New Rio de Janeiro Tercio (to distinguish it from the existing Old Tercio), which was distributed among the garrisons of the forts defending Guanabara Bay.	
1707		British Army	King Charles II of England	Kingdom of Great Britain	United Kingdom	The British Army traces back to 1707 and the formation of the united Kingdom of Great Britain which joined the Kingdoms of England and Scotland into a single state and, with that, united the English Army and the Scots Army as the British Army.	
1716		Corps of Royal Engineers	Board of Ordnance	Kingdom of Great Britain	United Kingdom	Formed by the Board of Ordnance in 1716, can trace their origins back to the military engineers brought to England by William the Conqueror.	
1741		211th Military Police Battalion		(Kingdom of England) Colony of Massachusetts Bay	(Massachusetts) (United States)	Part of the Massachusetts National Guard	
1742		116th Infantry Regiment (United States)		(Kingdom of England) Colony of Virginia	Virginia (United States)	Oldest unit in continuous operation in the Virginia National Guard. Today part of the 116th Mobile Brigade Combat Team, 29th Infantry Division	
1747		111th Infantry Regiment	Benjamin Franklin	(Kingdom of England) Province of Pennsylvania	Pennsylvania (United States)	The 111th is the oldest unit in the Pennsylvania National Guard. Today, 1st Battalion, 111th Infantry is part of the 56th Stryker Brigade Combat Team, 28th Infantry Division	
1758		Madras Regiment	East India Company	(East India Company) Company Raj	India	The Madras Regiment is the oldest infantry regiment of the Indian Army, originating in the 1750s. In 1758 Stringer Lawrence raised the Madras Regiment, forming the several Companies of Madras Levies into two battalions.	
1759		Punjab Regiment	East India Company	(East India Company) Company Raj	Pakistan	The Punjab Regiment is the oldest infantry regiment of the Pakistan Army. It traces its roots to the senior-most battalion of the 1st Punjab Regiment, currently existing as the 1st Battalion, Punjab Regiment.	
1761		Punjab Regiment	East India Company	(East India Company) Company Raj	India	The Punjab Regiment is second oldest regiments still in service in the Indian Army, and is the most senior regional infantry regiment. It was formed from the 2nd Punjab Regiment of the British Indian Army in 1947.	
1768		Maratha Light Infantry	East India Company	(East India Company) Company Raj	India	The Maratha Light Infantry is a light infantry regiment of the Indian Army. It traces its lineage to the Bombay Sepoys, raised in 1768, making it the most senior light infantry regiment in the Indian Army.	
1771		First Company Governor's Foot Guard		(Thirteen Colonies) Connecticut Colony	Connecticut (United States)	The First Company Governor's Foot Guard is the oldest still operational unit of Connecticut's Governor's Guards, and claims to be the oldest continously operating military unit in the United States.	
1774		175th Infantry Regiment	Mordecai Gist	(Kingdom of England) Province of Maryland	Maryland (United States)	Oldest unit still in operation in the Maryland National Guard.	
1774		Second Company Governor's Foot Guard		(Thirteen Colonies) Connecticut Colony	Connecticut (United States)	Second oldest unit in continous operation of Connecticut's Governor's Guards.	
1775		Queen's York Rangers (1st American Regiment)	Robert Rogers	(Kingdom of Great Britain) British North America	Canada	The Queen's York Rangers (1st American Regiment) (RCAC) is a Canadian Army Primary Reserve Royal Canadian Armoured Corps regiment based in Toronto and Aurora. It was founded in 1775 as the Queen's Rangers however it traces its origins back to 1756.	
1775		Rajputana Rifles	East India Company	(East India Company) Company Raj	India	The Rajputana Rifles is the oldest rifle regiment of the Indian Army. It was raised in January of 1775 as 5th Battalion, Bombay Sepoys.	
1776		1st Battalion, 5th Field Artillery Regiment	Alexander Hamilton	Continental Congress	United States	1st Battalion, 5th Field Artillery is the oldest unit in the U.S. Regular Army and the only existing Regular Army unit that fought in the American Revolution.	
1778		The Grenadiers	East India Company	(East India Company) Company Raj	India	The Grenadiers is an infantry regiment of the Indian Army, formerly part of the Bombay Army and later the pre-independence British Indian Army, when the regiment was known as the 4th Bombay Grenadiers.	
1778		Rajput Regiment	East India Company	(East India Company) Company Raj	India	The Rajput Regiment traces its history back to 1778, when the 24th Regiment of Bengal Native Infantry was formed. The Regiment's 1st Battalion was later formed in 1798.	
1784		3rd Infantry Regiment "The Old Guard"	Josiah Harmar	United States	United States	The 3rd Infantry Regiment can trace its history to the First American Regiment organized on 12 August 1784 under the command of Lieutenant Colonel Commandant Josiah Harmar.	
1788		First Company Governor's Horse Guards		(Thirteen Colonies) Connecticut Colony	Connecticut (United States)	The First Company Horse Guards are the oldest mounted cavalry unit of the Governor's Guards and are among the oldest in the United States.	
1790		United States Coast Guard (as the Revenue Marine)	United States	District of Columbia	United States	The US Coast guard is the maritime security, search and rescue, and law enforcement service branch of the United States Armed Forces and one of the country's eight uniformed services.	
1790		Veteran Corps of Artillery of the State of NY	United States	New York City	United States	Federally- and state-recognized Field Artillery unit founded at the end of the Revolutionary War to prevent a return of the British. Founded in 1790, it is the oldest military unit in New York State.	
1795		Royal Newfoundland Regiment	Thomas Skinner	Newfoundland Colony	Canada	The Royal Newfoundland Regiment is an infantry regiment of the Canadian Army. It fought in the War of 1812, World War I, World War II, and the War in Afghanistan. The regiment was founded in 1795 however it traces its origins back to 1704.	
1795		Jat Regiment	East India Company	(East India Company) Company Raj	India	The Jat Regiment is part of the infantry of the Indian Army. Numerous battalions of the Jat Regiment, including the 14th Murray's Jat Lancers, fought in the First World War.	
1795		Border Guards Bangladesh	East India Company	(East India Company) Company Raj	Bangladesh	The Border Guards Bangladesh is a paramilitary force responsible for the border security of Bangladesh. This force started its journey on 29 June 1795 with the name of 'Ramgarh Local Battalion' previously named 'Frontier Protection Force' formed by East India Company in 1794.	
1796		Royal Army Veterinary Corps	Board of Ordnance	(Kingdom of Great Britain) The United Kingdom Of Great Britain	United Kingdom	The Royal Army Veterinary Corps was founded in 1796 after public outrage concerning the death of Army horses. Prior to this date, the management and care of army horses had been left to each individual regiment's Quartermaster.	
1798		Baloch Regiment	East India Company	(East India Company) Company Raj	Pakistan	The Baloch Regiment is an infantry regiment of the Pakistan Army. Its senior-most battalion, the 1st Battalion, was raised in 1798 as the 3rd Extra Battalion of Madras Native Infantry at Masulipatam.	

== See also ==
- Lists of armies
- List of oldest institutions in continuous operation
- List of Army National Guard and active Regular Army units with colonial roots in the U.S.
