= Patrik Gardesten =

Swedish military officer (born 1967)

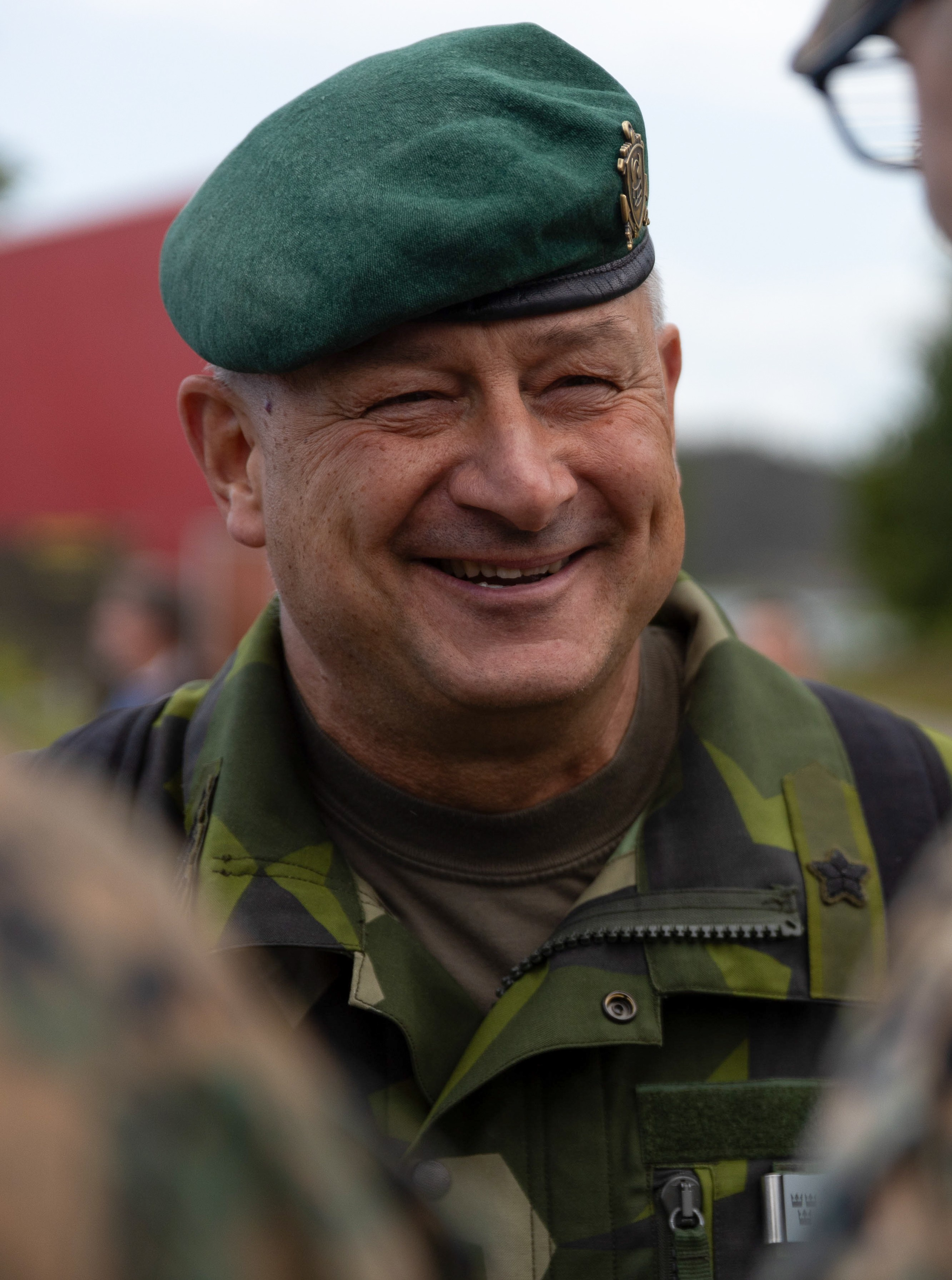
- Gardesten in June 2024.
- Born: Jan Patrik Gardesten; 7 July 1967 (age 59); Kalmar Municipality, Sweden
- Military career
- Allegiance: Sweden
- Branch: Amphibious Corps (Swedish Navy)
- Service years: 1991–present
- Rank: Brigadier General
- Commands: TD01/F, Chad; 2nd Battalion, Amf 1; J3 Operations Dept., Joint Forces Command; 1st Marine Regiment (Amf 1); Deputy Chief of Navy
- Conflicts: Chadian Civil War; War in Afghanistan

Brigadier General Jan Patrik Gardesten (born 7 July 1967) is an officer in the Swedish Amphibious Corps. He currently serves as the Assistant Chief of Staff Strategic Plans and Policy at the HQ Supreme Allied Command Transformation in Norfolk, Virginia, United States. Gardesten had previously served as commander of the 2nd Marine Battalion, 1st Marine Regiment (2010–2013), head of the J3 Operations Department (2016–2018) in the Joint Forces Command, regimental commander of the 1st Marine Regiment (2018–2022), and as Deputy Chief of Navy (2022–2025).

== Early life ==
Gardesten was born on 7 July 1967 in Mortorp Parish, Kalmar Municipality, Sweden. Gardesten enrolled at the Coastal Ranger School (Kustjägarskolan) in Vaxholm Coastal Artillery Regiment for his mandatory military service in 1988. There he served in the 1st Coastal Ranger Platoon. His deputy platoon leader was then-Lieutenant Peder Ohlsson, who would later be his predecessor both as commander of the 1st Marine Regiment and as Deputy Chief of Navy.

== Career ==
Gardesten graduated from the Swedish Navy Officers' College (Marinens officershögskola, MOHS) in Karlskrona in 1991. He was commissioned as an officer the same year and was assigned as a second lieutenant to Vaxholm Coastal Artillery Regiment. Gardesten then served in the 4th Coastal Artillery Brigade with the Karlskrona Coastal Artillery Regiment (from 1998 called the Karlskrona Coastal Artillery Regiment with the 2nd Coastal Artillery Brigade), where he was promoted to lieutenant in 1995 and to captain in 1998. When the Swedish Coastal Artillery was decommissioned, he transferred to the Swedish Amphibious Corps on 1 July 2000. Gardesten later served in the Amphibious Combat School (Amfibiestridsskolan, AmfSS) In 2006, Gardesten completed a bachelor's thesis in military science at the Swedish Defence University about the Swedish Navy's response organization by analyzing the Defence Act of 2004. The purpose of the thesis was to "increase the understanding of political decision-making and of which factors, via political decision, can indirectly influence the design of the navy response organization." After management course at the Swedish Defence University he served as section head at the Swedish Naval Warfare Centre in Karlskrona.

Gardesten was commander of the Swedish contingent TD01/F, part of the European Union Military Operation in Chad and the Central African Republic (EUFOR Tchad/RCA) in Chad and the Central African Republic from 2008 to 2009. He served as commander of the 2nd Marine Battalion of the 1st Marine Regiment from 2010 to 2013. In March 2012, Gardesten served as deputy commander of the mechanized battalion that marines were part of during exercise Cold Response in Norway. During 2013, Gardesten was posted as deputy commander of the 25th Swedish contingent (FS25) in Afghanistan, part of the International Security Assistance Force (ISAF).

Gardesten was promoted to colonel on 1 January 2016 and assumed the position as head of the J3 Operations Department in the Joint Forces Command (Insatsstaben, INSS) at the Swedish Armed Forces Headquarters in Stockholm. In this position he also served as Operations Commander (operationsledare) to the Chief of Joint Operations, Vice Admiral Jan Thörnqvist. On 18 January 2018, Gardesten assumed the command of the 1st Marine Regiment. He also assumed the command of Haninge Garrison. At a ceremony at Berga Naval Base in Haninge Garrison on 19 January 2018, colonel Peder Ohlsson handed over command to colonel Gardesten. In September 2021, Gardesten commanded exercise Archipelago Endeavor in Stockholm Archipelago in cooperation with the United States Marine Corps which began the day after Zapad 2021 ended. The exercise contained units from the 1st Battalion, 6th Marines, 2nd Marine Division and Swedish marines from the 204th Rifle Company, 2nd Marine Battalion, 1st Marine Regiment.

On 30 June 2022, the Supreme Commander of the Swedish Armed Forces, General Micael Bydén decided to appoint Gardesten as the new Deputy Chief of Navy; he was promoted to brigadier general at the same time. On 31 May 2025, he took office as Assistant Chief of Staff Strategic Plans and Policy at HQ Supreme Allied Command Transformation in Norfolk, Virginia, United States.

== Dates of rank ==
- 1991 – Second lieutenant
- 1995 – Lieutenant
- 1998 – Captain
- ???? – Major
- ???? – Lieutenant colonel
- 2016 – Colonel
- 2022 – Brigadier general

== Awards and decorations ==
=== Swedish ===
- (Sweden) For Zealous and Devoted Service of the Realm
- (Sweden) Swedish Armed Forces Conscript Medal
- (Sweden) Swedish Armed Forces International Service Medal
- (Sweden) National Swedish Association of Military Friendship Merit Badge (Sveriges Militära Kamratföreningarnas Riksförbunds förtjänsttecken, SMKRGFt) in gold (18 June 2020)
- (Sweden) Home Guard Bronze Medal (18 March 2022)
- (Sweden) Coastal Ranger Association Medal of Merit (Förbundet Kustjägarnas förtjänstmedalj)
- (Sweden) 1st Marine Regiment Medal of Merit (Vaxholms amfibieregementes förtjänstmedalj, VaxamfregGM/SM)
- (Sweden) Småland Brigade Commemorative Medal (Smålandsbrigadens minnesmedalj)
- (Sweden) Amphibious Combat School Commemorative Medal (Amfibiestridsskolans minnesmedalj, AmfSSMSM) in silver
- (Sweden) 4th Marine Regiment Commemorative Medal (Älvsborgs amfibieregementes minnesmedalj, ÄlvsbamfregMSM)
- (Sweden) Karlskrona Coastal Artillery Regiment Commemorative Medal (Karlskrona kustartilleriregementes minnesmedalj, KarlskronakaregSMM)

=== Foreign ===
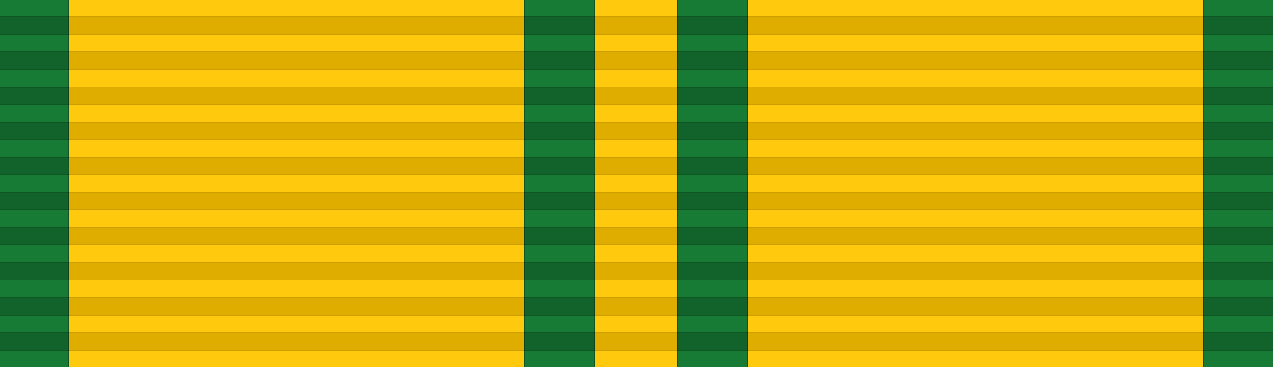
- (Netherlands) Cross for the Four Day Marches
- (European Union) Bridging Operation in Chad and the Central African Republic (EUFOR Tchad/RCA) (October 2008)
- NATO Non-Article 5 medal for ISAF (2013)

== Honours ==
- Member of the Royal Swedish Academy of War Sciences (18 May 2016)
- Member of the Royal Swedish Society of Naval Sciences (25 September 2019)

Military offices
Preceded by Peder Ohlsson	Commander, 1st Marine Regiment; 2018–2022	Succeeded by Adam Camél
Preceded by Peder Ohlsson	Deputy Chief of Navy; 2022–2025	Succeeded by Fredrik Herlitz
