= Peder Ohlsson =

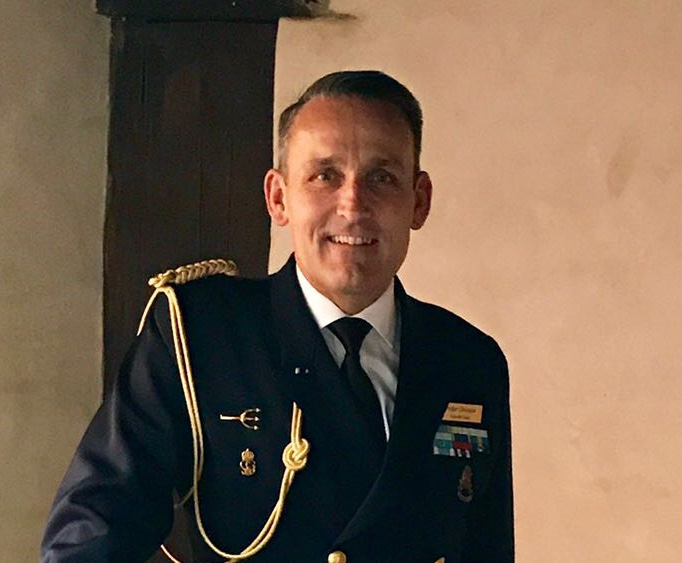
- Born: Dennis Peder Dag Ohlsson; 10 March 1962 (age 64); Karlstorp, Sweden
- Military career
- Allegiance: Sweden
- Branch: Amphibious Corps (Swedish Navy)
- Service years: 1984–2023
- Rank: Major General
- Commands: TD01, Chad; FS25, Afghanistan; 1st Marine Regiment; Haninge Garrison; Gotland Garrison; Joint Support Staff; Deputy Chief of Navy; Director of Communication and Public Affairs
- Conflicts: Chadian Civil War; War in Afghanistan
- Other work: Chief of His Majesty's Military Staff

Major General Dennis Peder Dag Ohlsson (born 10 March 1962) is a retired officer in the Swedish Amphibious Corps. He currently serves in the Royal Court of Sweden as Chief of His Majesty's Military Staff.

== Early life ==
Ohlsson was born on 10 March 1962 in Karlstorp Parish in Vetlanda Municipality, Sweden. Ohlsson did his military service in Vaxholm Coastal Artillery Regiment in Vaxholm and served after the basic training as an instructor in the summer of 1982 at the then Coastal Ranger School (Kustjägarskolan) at the regiment, a service that provided a few months of opportunity for instructor experience before the officer training began in Gothenburg.

== Career ==
Ohlsson graduated from the Swedish Navy Officers' College in Gothenburg (Marinens officershögskola i Göteborg, MOHS G) in 1984 and was commissioned as an officer the same year and was assigned as a second lieutenant to Vaxholm Coastal Artillery Regiment, where he was promoted to lieutenant in 1988. In 1988, Ohlsson served as acting platoon leader at the Coastal Ranger School (Kustjägarskolan) in Vaxholm. He was promoted to captain in 1991 and to major in 1996. Ohlsson was educated at, among other places, the Marine Corps University at Marine Corps Base Quantico in Virginia, United States from 2004 to 2005. After being promoted to lieutenant colonel, he was battalion commander in the 1st Marine Regiment from 2006 to 2007 and commander of the Swedish contingent TD01, part of the European Union Military Operation in Chad and the Central African Republic (EUFOR Tchad/RCA) in Chad and the Central African Republic during 2008. Between 2008 and 2011, Ohlsson was posted as head of the Strategic Section at the Swedish Armed Forces Headquarters. In 2011, Ohlsson served as a military adviser to the SRSG in the United Nations Assistance Mission in Afghanistan (UNAMA) located at UN Headquarters in Kabul.

After being promoted to colonel, Ohlsson served as chief developer in the Human Resources Staff (Personalstaben, PERSS) at the Swedish Armed Forces Headquarters from 2012 to 2013 and then commander of the 25th Swedish contingent (FS25), part of the International Security Assistance Force (ISAF), from May to December 2013. From 2014 to 2018, he served as regimental commander of the 1st Marine Regiment also commander of Haninge and Gotland Garrisons. From 2018 to 2020, Ohlsson served in the Joint Support Staff (Insatsstaben, INSS) at the Swedish Armed Forces Headquarters, and from 12 April 2018 as head of the Joint Support Staff, as well as chief of staff of the Joint Forces Command. On 20 March 2020, Ohlsson was promoted to brigadier general and was appointed Deputy Chief of Navy. From 1 September 2022, Ohlsson serves as Director of Communication and Public Affairs and head of the Communications Department in the Swedish Armed Forces Headquarters. On 1 October 2023, he was promoted to major general and appointed Chief of His Majesty's Military Staff, succeeding Lieutenant General Jan Salestrand.

From 2010 to 2023, Ohlsson served as ADC to Victoria, Crown Princess of Sweden, and from 2013 to 2020 as ADC to his His Majesty the King Carl XVI Gustaf. On 10 May 2014, Ohlsson succeeded brigadier general Ola Truedsson as chairman of Vapenbröderna, a friendship association of Vaxholm Coastal Artillery Regiment. Since 2018, Ohlsson serves as chairman of the KIng's Hospital Fund.

== Dates of rank ==
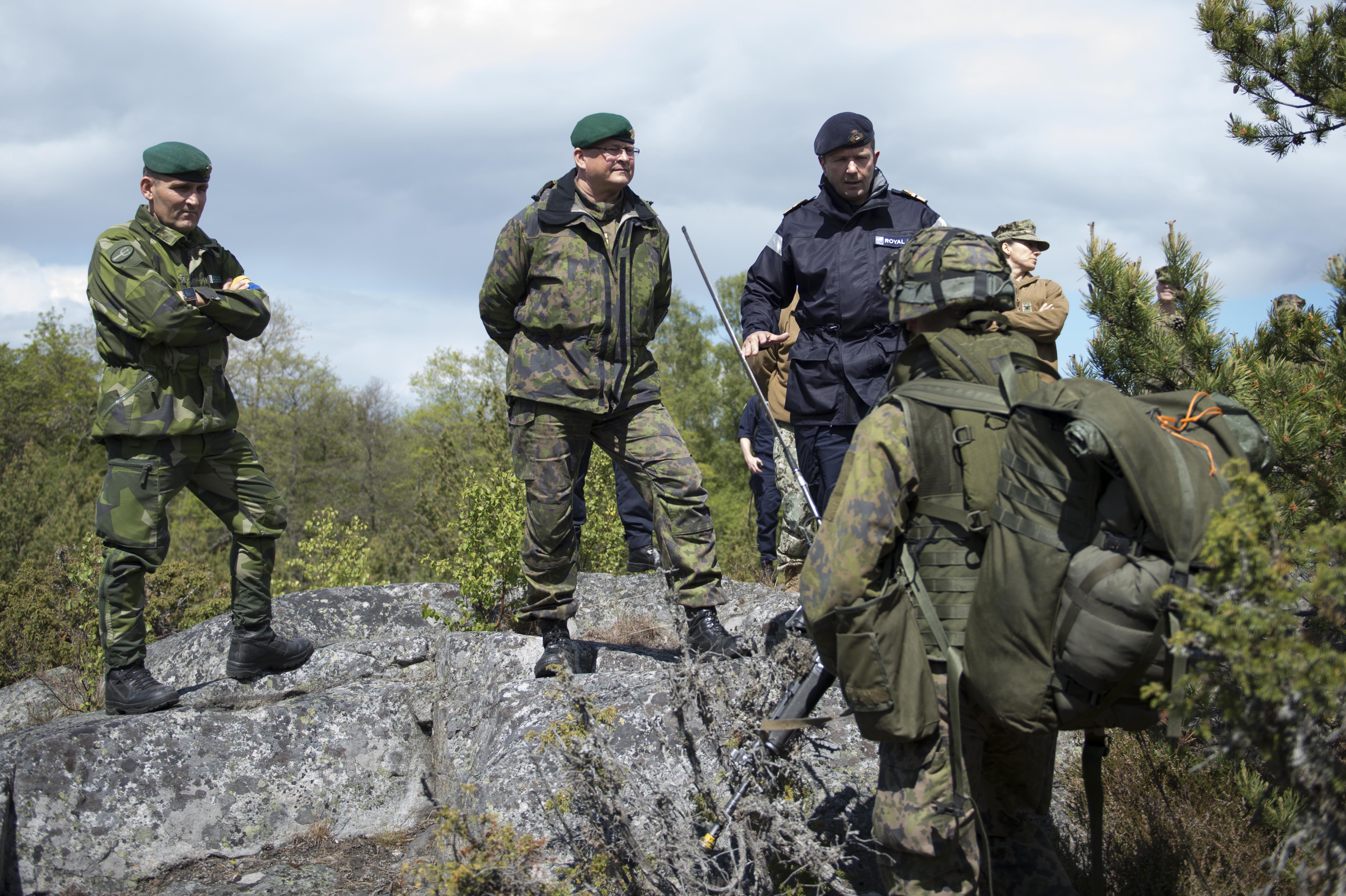
Colonel Ohlsson (left) at Utö in 2016.

- 1984 – Second lieutenant
- 1988 – Lieutenant
- 1991 – Captain
- 1996 – Major
- 2004 – Lieutenant colonel
- 2011 – Colonel
- 2020 – Brigadier general
- 1 October 2023 – Major general

== Awards and decorations ==
=== Swedish ===
- (Sweden) King Carl XVI Gustaf's Jubilee Commemorative Medal II (2013)
- (Sweden) King Carl XVI Gustaf's Jubilee Commemorative Medal III (2016)
- (Sweden) H. M. The King's Medal, 8th size gold (silver-gilt) medal worn on the chest suspended by the Order of the Seraphim ribbon (2015)
- (Sweden) Crown Princess Victoria and Prince Daniel's Wedding Commemorative Medal (2010)
- (Sweden) For Zealous and Devoted Service of the Realm
- (Sweden) Swedish Armed Forces Conscript Medal
- (Sweden) Swedish Armed Forces International Service Medal
- (Sweden) Coastal Ranger Association Medal of Merit (Förbundet Kustjägarnas förtjänstmedalj)

=== Foreign ===
- (Denmark) Commander 1st Class of the Order of the Dannebrog (26 April 2024)
- Knight of the Order of the Lion of Finland
- (European Union) Bridging Operation in Chad and the Central African Republic (EUFOR Tchad/RCA)
- NATO Non-Article 5 medal for ISAF
- United Nations Special Service Medal (UNAMA)

== Honours ==
- Member of the Royal Swedish Academy of War Sciences (2004)
- Member of the Royal Swedish Society of Naval Sciences (2011)

Military offices
Preceded by Michael Claesson as Commander, FS24	Commander, FS25; May 2013–December 2013	Succeeded by Micael Berner as Commander, FS26
Preceded by Ola Truedsson	Commander, 1st Marine Regiment; 2014–2018	Succeeded by Patrik Gardesten
Preceded by Anders Olovsson	Deputy Chief of Navy; 2020–2022	Succeeded by Patrik Gardesten
Preceded by Mats Ström	Director of Communication and Public Affairs; 2022–2023	Succeeded by Anna Siverstig
Court offices
Preceded by Jan Salestrand	Chief of His Majesty's Military Staff; 2023–present	Succeeded by Incumbent
