= Fredrik Herlitz =

Swedish military officer (born 1973)

- Born: Carl Fredrik Wilhelm Herlitz; 7 May 1973 (age 53); Järfälla, Sweden
- Military career
- Allegiance: Sweden
- Branch: Amphibious Corps (Swedish Navy)
- Service years: 1996–present
- Rank: Brigadier General
- Commands: 2nd Battalion, Amf 1; 4th Marine Regiment; Deputy Chief of Navy
- Conflicts: Chadian Civil War

Brigadier General Carl Fredrik Wilhelm Herlitz (born 7 May 1973) is an officer in the Swedish Amphibious Corps. Herlitz was commissioned as a naval officer in 1996 and has held several key command and staff positions within the Swedish Navy and Amphibious Corps. He served in the EUFOR mission in Chad and the Central African Republic (2007–2008) and later commanded the 2nd Marine Battalion (2015–2018). After leading M5 in the Naval Staff, he became the first commanding officer of the re-established 4th Marine Regiment in 2021. In June 2025, he was appointed Deputy Chief of Navy and promoted to brigadier general.

== Early life ==
Herlitz was born on 7 May 1973 in Järfälla Parish in Stockholm County, Sweden.

== Career ==
Herlitz graduated from the Naval Officers' College (Marinens officershögskola, MOHS) in 1996 and was commissioned the same year as a second lieutenant at the Vaxholm Coastal Artillery Regiment, where he was promoted to lieutenant in 1999. He completed the Navy Tactical Program (TaPM) at the Military Academy Karlberg from 2000 to 2001 and the Staff Program at the Swedish National Defence College from 2004 to 2005. From August 2005 to January 2007, Herlitz served as commander of the 201st Command and Control Company within the 2nd Marine Battalion of the 1st Marine Regiment. He then commanded the Command and Logistics Company in the International Amphibious Task Force (Internationella amfibiestyrkan, IAS) from January to July 2007.

During the Chadian Civil War, from July 2007 to August 2008, he served as a major and deputy commander of the Swedish rifle company in the Swedish contingent TD01—comprising around 200 Swedish soldiers—as part of the European Union Military Operation in Chad and the Central African Republic (EUFOR Tchad/RCA). The mission's objective was to protect refugee camps and secure humanitarian convoys in the conflict-affected areas of Chad and northeastern Central African Republic.

From October 2008 to February 2012, Herlitz served as a development officer in the Functional Unit of the 1st Marine Regiment. Between January and October 2010, he was posted as a staff officer in the J3 CONOPS (Concept of Operations) section at the Kosovo Force (KFOR) Headquarters. He completed the Higher Staff Course at the Swedish National Defence College between 2012 and 2014, earning a Master of Philosophy degree. In August 2014, he became head of the Functional Unit (Funktionsenheten, FunkE) within the Amphibious Warfare Section at the Swedish Naval Warfare Centre. In May 2015, he was appointed commander of the 2nd Marine Battalion, a position he held until 31 August 2018, when he was succeeded by Lieutenant Colonel Patrik Berge.

He subsequently served as head of M5 within the Maritime Component Command and the Naval Staff (re-established on 1 January 2019) from September 2018 to July 2021. From July to October 2021, he led the Establishment Organization of the 4th Marine Regiment in Gothenburg. On 1 October 2021, Herlitz was promoted to colonel and became the first commanding officer of the re-established 4th Marine Regiment, as well as the garrison commander in Gothenburg.

Herlitz assumed the position of Deputy Chief of Navy on 17 June 2025 and was promoted to brigadier general at that time.

== Dates of rank ==
- 1996 – Second lieutenant
- 1999 – Lieutenant
- ???? – Captain
- ???? – Major
- ???? – Lieutenant colonel
- 1 October 2021 – Colonel
- 17 June 2025 – Brigadier general

== Awards and decorations ==
- (Sweden) Swedish Armed Forces Conscript Medal
- (Sweden) Swedish Armed Forces International Service Medal
- (European Union) Bridging Operation in Chad and the Central African Republic (EUFOR Tchad/RCA)

== Honours ==
- Member of the Royal Swedish Society of Naval Sciences (2019)

Military offices
| Preceded by Per Gottfridsson | Commander, 2nd Battalion, 1st Marine Regiment; 2015–2018 | Succeeded by Patrik Berge |
| Preceded by None | Commander, 4th Marine Regiment; 2021–2025 | Succeeded by Oscar Peterson |
| Preceded by Patrik Gardesten | Deputy Chief of Navy; 2025–present | Succeeded by Incumbent |
