= 1st Marine Regiment (Sweden) =

Swedish amphibious unit

Coordinates: 59.077889°N 18.133167°E

- Stockholms amfibieregemente
- Active: 2000–present
- Country: Sweden
- Branch: Swedish Navy
- Garrison/HQ: Berga Naval Base
- Beret colour: Commando green
- March: "Gardeskamrater" (S. Rydberg) (Note: The march was inherited from the Vaxholm Coastal Artillery Regiment.)
- Mascot: Torleif
- Engagements: Kosovo War (KFOR); War in Afghanistan (ISAF); Chadian Civil War (EUFOR Tchad/RCA); Operation Atalanta

Commanders
- Current commander: COL David Saflind

Insignia
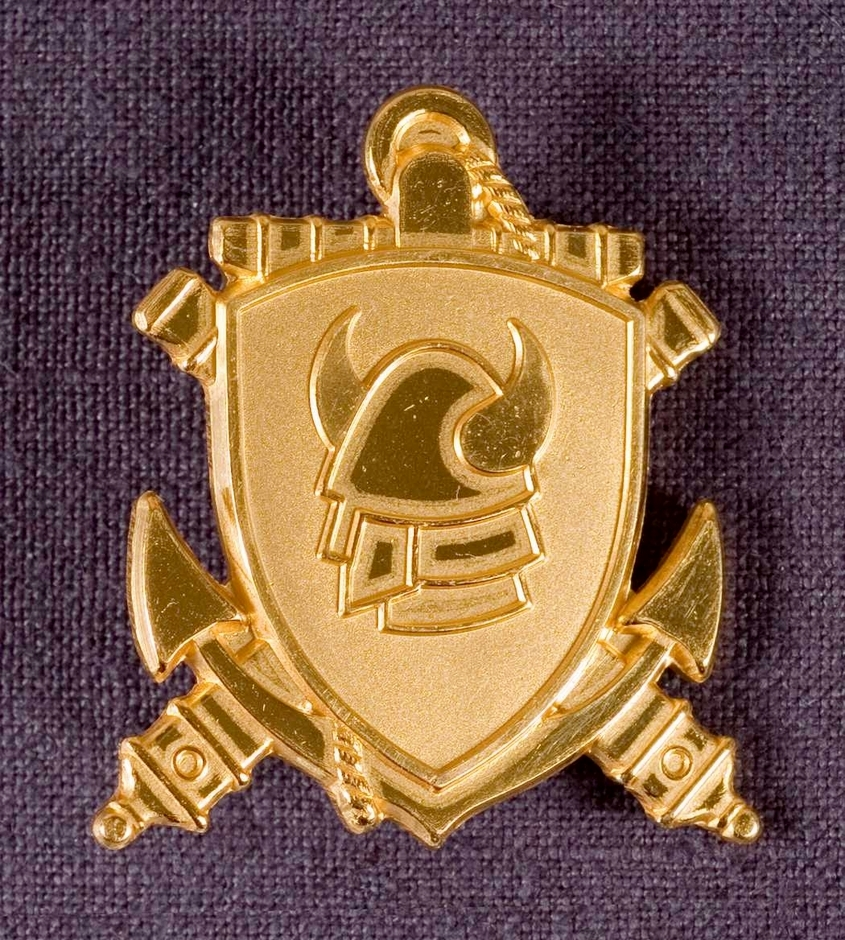
- Cap badge

The 1st Marine Regiment (Swedish: Stockholms amfibieregemente, Amf 1) is a marine regiment of the Swedish Amphibious Corps based at the Berga Naval Base in Berga, Haninge Municipality. Raised from the Vaxholm Coastal Artillery Regiment (KA 1) in 2000 when the Swedish Amphibious Corps was formed, the 1st Marine Regiment has a large geographical spread where units are trained and grouped at Berga, south of Stockholm, in Gothenburg and in Gotland. Although the unit's natural combat environment is coastal zones, river deltas and other amphibious areas, the unit has the ability to operate in all types of terrain, such as desert. The 1st Marine Regiment has participated in operations in, for example, Kosovo, Gulf of Aden, Chad and Afghanistan.

== History ==
Prior to the Defence Act of 2000, the Swedish government's starting point was that only two units were needed to meet the Swedish Armed Forces' future training of coastal artillery units. One unit was intended to be a main unit for the combat arm. Prior to the Defence Act, there were four coastal artillery regiments, Vaxholm Coast Artillery Regiment and the 1st Coastal Artillery Brigade (KA 1) in Vaxholm, Karlskrona Coastal Artillery Regiment and the 2nd Coastal Artillery Brigade (KA 2) in Karlskrona, Gotland Coastal Artillery Regiment (KA 3) on Gotland and Älvsborg Coastal Artillery Regiment (KA 4) in Gothenburg. The government considered that the coastal artillery regiment in Vaxholm would constitute the main unit of the Swedish Armed Forces' basic organization. Given that Vaxholm had an existing infrastructure with a good proximity to the Stockholm archipelago with training areas, which was considered well-dimensioned for the terrain types the unit was expected to operate in. Further arguments for retaining Vaxholm were to maintain coordination with other marine units in the Stockholm area. The government also found that the other coastal artillery regiments lacked the prerequisites to form the main unit for the coastal artillery.

On the question of which of the other units that would remain to form a support unit for Vaxholm, was between the coastal artillery regiments in Karlskrona and in Gothenburg. In the overall assessment, it was considered that greater investments in both Gothenburg and Karlskrona would be required, as they both lacked the type of training area that Vaxholm had. On the other hand, both were considered suitable as a support unit for Vaxholm. But the government's choice fell on Gothenburg. Among other things, with the argument that Gothenburg as Sweden's second city needed a military presence. But also the central location in Western Sweden, seen from a conscript travel perspective, contributed to the coastal artillery regiment in Gothenburg. The coastal artillery regiment on Gotland was never relevant to either a main unit or a support unit. As a result, Vaxholm Coastal Artillery Regiment and the 1st Coastal Artillery Brigade (KA 1) in Vaxholm and Älvsborg Coastal Artillery Regiment (KA 4) in Gothenburg remained in the basic organization, while the Karlskrona Coastal Artillery Regiment and the 2nd Coastal Artillery Brigade (KA 2) in Karlskrona and the Gotland Coastal Artillery Regiment (KA 3) on Gotland were disbanded.

With the Defence Act, the fixed coastal artillery was discontinued, and the remaining units instead came to form amphibious units, where the two coastal artillery regiments were reorganized into amphibious regiments, which organized one amphibious brigade staff and three amphibious battalions. On 30 June, the coastal artillery was disbanded, and on 1 July 2000, the Swedish Amphibious Corps was formed with the Vaxholm Amphibian Regiment (Amf 1), Älvsborg Amphibian Regiment (Amf 4) and the Amphibious Combat School (Amfibiestridsskolan, AmfSS). Prior to the Defence Act of 2004, the government felt that only one platform for training amphibious units in the basic organization was needed, where the government considered that Vaxholm Amphibian Regiment (Amf 1) should be maintained. Among other things, when referring to the government's bill 1999/2000: 30, where the government highlighted Vaxholm as the main platform because of the good practice conditions in the Stockholm archipelago, and that the valuation that was then made was still valid. It was then found that the regiment in Gothenburg had limited training conditions.

Instead of continuing with amphibious training in Vaxholm, the government proposed in its bill that the regiment should be relocated to Haninge/Berga, where the regiment would take over the location from the Svea Helicopter Battalion (Svea helikopterbataljon) as well as the Swedish Naval Schools (Örlogsskolorna, ÖS). Furthermore, it was considered important that in the future it was important to train unit that could operate also on the West Coast, which meant that the facility at Känsö would be maintained, and constitute a detachment to Vaxholm Amphibian Regiment. On 3 October 2005, the colour was lowered for the last time at Vaxholm Amphibian Regiment (Amf 1) in Vaxholm, in the presence of the Supreme Commander, General Håkan Syrén and other dignitaries. As a result, the military presence in Vaxholm ceased. Later that day, the flag was hoisted at the 1st Amphibian Regiment (Amf 1) in Berga. A decommissioning organization remained in Rindö until 30 June 2006. The last companies were installed in Berga in December 2005. The first big draft was made in January 2006. After the relocation to Berga, the name Första amfibieregementet (Amf 1) was adopted. In 2006, the regiment adopted a shorter name form, in the form of the Amfibieregementet (Amf 1). On 1 October 2021, the regiment adopted the name Stockholm amfibieregemente.

== Units ==
=== Current units ===
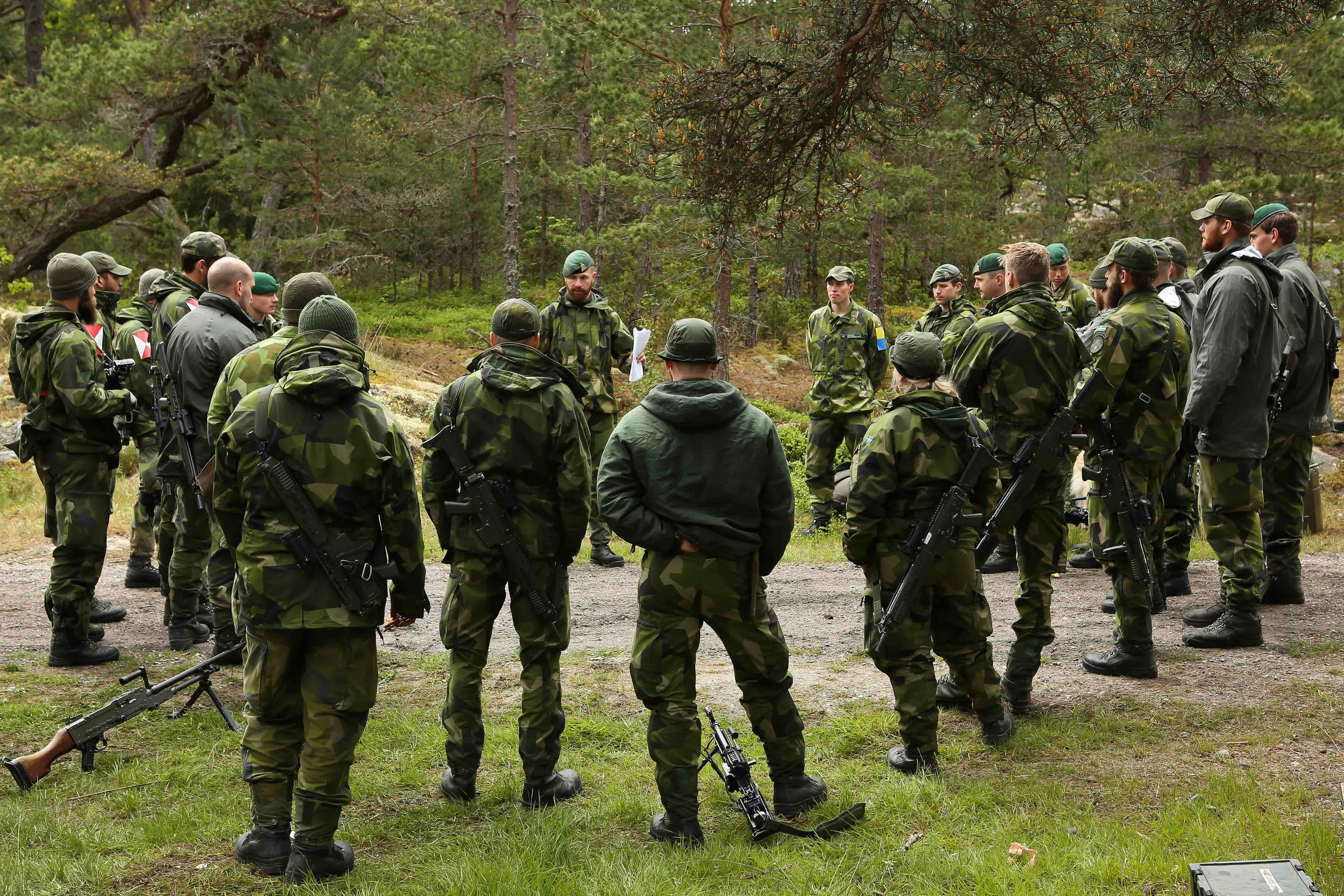
Marines from 2nd Amphibious Battalion during BALTOPS 2016 on the island of Utö.

- 2nd Amphibious Battalion or Victoria Battalion (2. amfibiebataljonen or Victoriabataljonen), is an amphibian unit and a so-called maneuvering battalion, which was raised within the 1st Marine Regiment in the years 2010–2011. The battalion is specialized in amphibious warfare and combat on foot and ground operations as a light infantry battalion. The battalion continuously and occasionally serving staff, who man a command and control company, the 202nd Coastal Ranger Company, three amphibious rifle companies and a maintenance company. The background to the name Victoria Battalion is based on the 4th Amphibious Battalion, which in 1994 was allowed to bear the same name of the Crown Princess. When the 4th Amphibious Battalion was disbanded, the 2nd Amphibious Battalion took over the name.
- 2nd Naval Supply Battalion (2. marina basbataljonen), is a naval logistics unit raised on the 2nd of october 2023 in order to secure military chains of logistics in the baltic sea region. The battalion is tasked with securing logistical support to all naval units from Oxelösund to Haparanda. The 2nd Naval Supply Battalion maintains units with manouver capability both at sea and on land. In order to maintain such flexibility the battalion utilises a number of vehicles including armored vehicles, hover craft, band wagons and the auxiliary ship HSwMS Trossö.

=== Previous units ===
- 132nd Naval Security Company (132. säkerhetskompani sjö), is an amphibian unit specializing in operating in an archipelago environment. The unit is able to move both on land and on water. The company consists of a command, a staff and logistics platoon, two security platoons and a reconnaissance platoon. On 1 October 2021 the company was transferred to the newly reinstated 4th Marine Regiment.
- 17th Patrol Boat Company (17. bevakningsbåtskompaniet), is an amphibious unit with the main tasks of engaging landing parties, monitoring sea (and airspace) and rejecting violations, protecting marine base area or port, engaging an enemy equipped with fast smaller motorboats, submarines, midget submarines, diver propulsion vehicles or divers. The company includes a staff section, patrol boat platoon, sensor platoon, naval boarding section, close protection section, and logistics section. On 1 October 2021 the company was transferred to the newly reinstated 4th Marine Regiment.
- Gotland Training Group (Gotlandsgruppen, GLG), raised on 1 July 2000 in connection with the Defence Act of 2000. The unit has its heritage and its traditions from the old Gotland Regiment (P 18), which was disbanded in connection with Defence Act of 2004. Through the same Defence Act, the unit became part of the 1st Marine Regiment from 1 January 2006. The unit educates and supports the Home Guard on Gotland, and its staff is located in Visby. The unit administers the Gotland Home Guard Battalion (32nd Home Guard Battalion). The unit together with the 32nd Home Guard Battalion were transferred to the new Gotland Regiment (P 18) on 1 July 2018.

== Locations, detachments and training grounds ==
=== Locations ===
The regiment took over the barracks area on Rindö where the Vaxholm Coastal Artillery Regiment (KA 1) was located. The area consisted of two barracks establishments, one of which the Vaxholm Coastal Artillery Regiment was placed to in 1906. The barracks were built after the 1901 Army Building Program after the Swedish Fortification Corps design for the infantry. The area consisted of two main barracks, which was built three stories high. In 1941, the coastal artillery also took over the establishment that was erected in 1907 for the Vaxholm Grenadier Regiment (I 26). It had also been erected according to the 1901 Army Building Program after the Fortification Corps design for the infantry. Just like the coastal artillery barracks, the barracks were built in only three floors, which was due to fortification reasons. The architect of the barracks establishments was Erik Josephson. After the Riksdag decided that the regiment was to be relocated to Berga Naval Base in Haninge Municipality, the move began on 1 January 2005, and ended on 30 June 2006. Vasallen AB took over as owner of the barracks area in Vaxholm on 1 October 2005. From 1 July 2006, the entire portfolio was to transferred Vasallen AB, which has since transformed the area into a residential area.

At Berga, the area was originally built in 1946 for the Berga Naval Training Schools. The barracks area is constructed after the design of the 1940 Military Building Investigation, and also includes Berga Castle built in 1915. From 1961, in addition to the harbor, the area also included Berga Heliport which was erected for the 1st Helicopter Division (1. helikopterdivisionen). Both the naval schools and the helicopter operations were disbanded in Berga through the Defence Act of 2004, which was taken over by the 1st Marine Regiment during a ceremony on 3 October 2005.

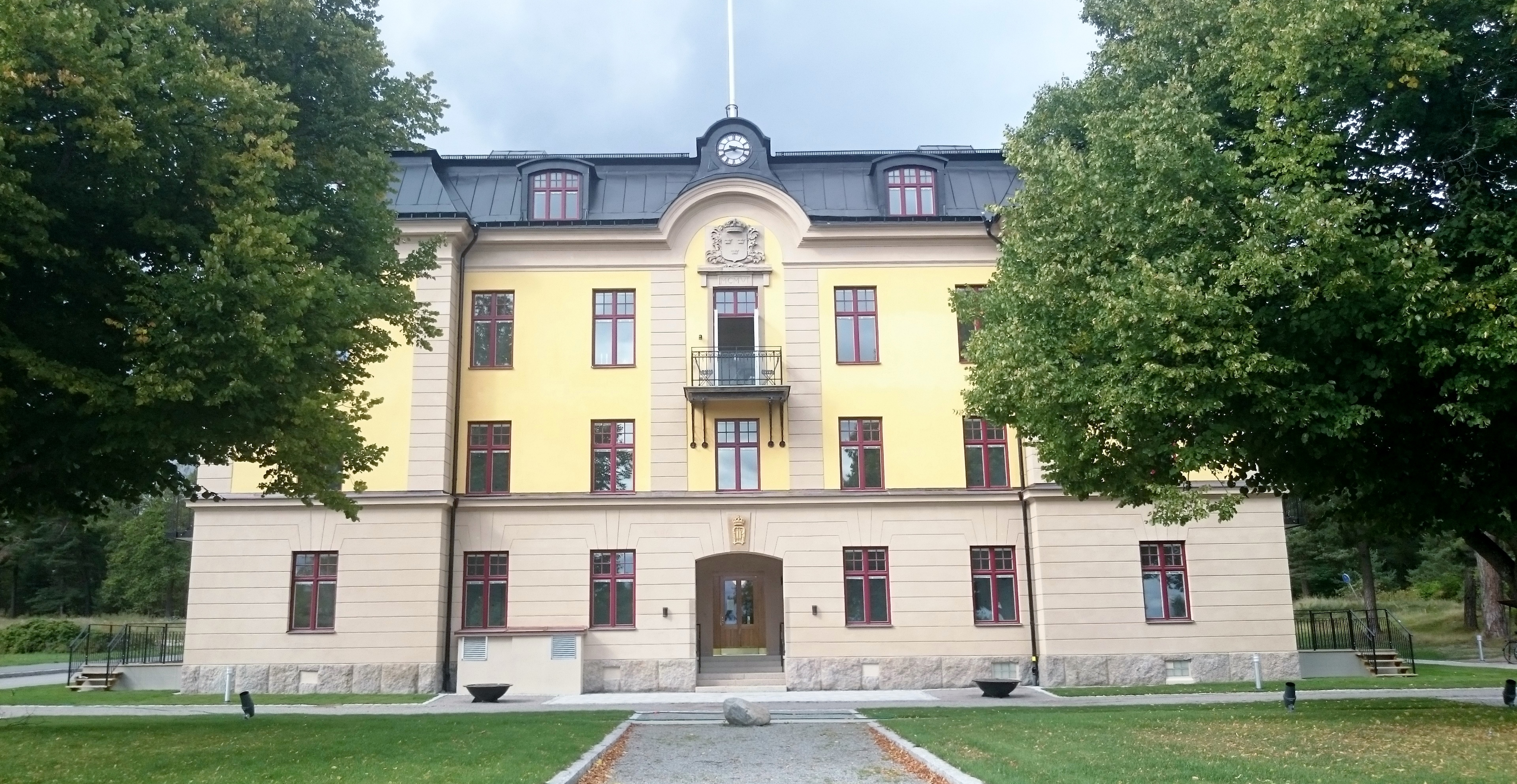
Former chancery building in Vaxholm.

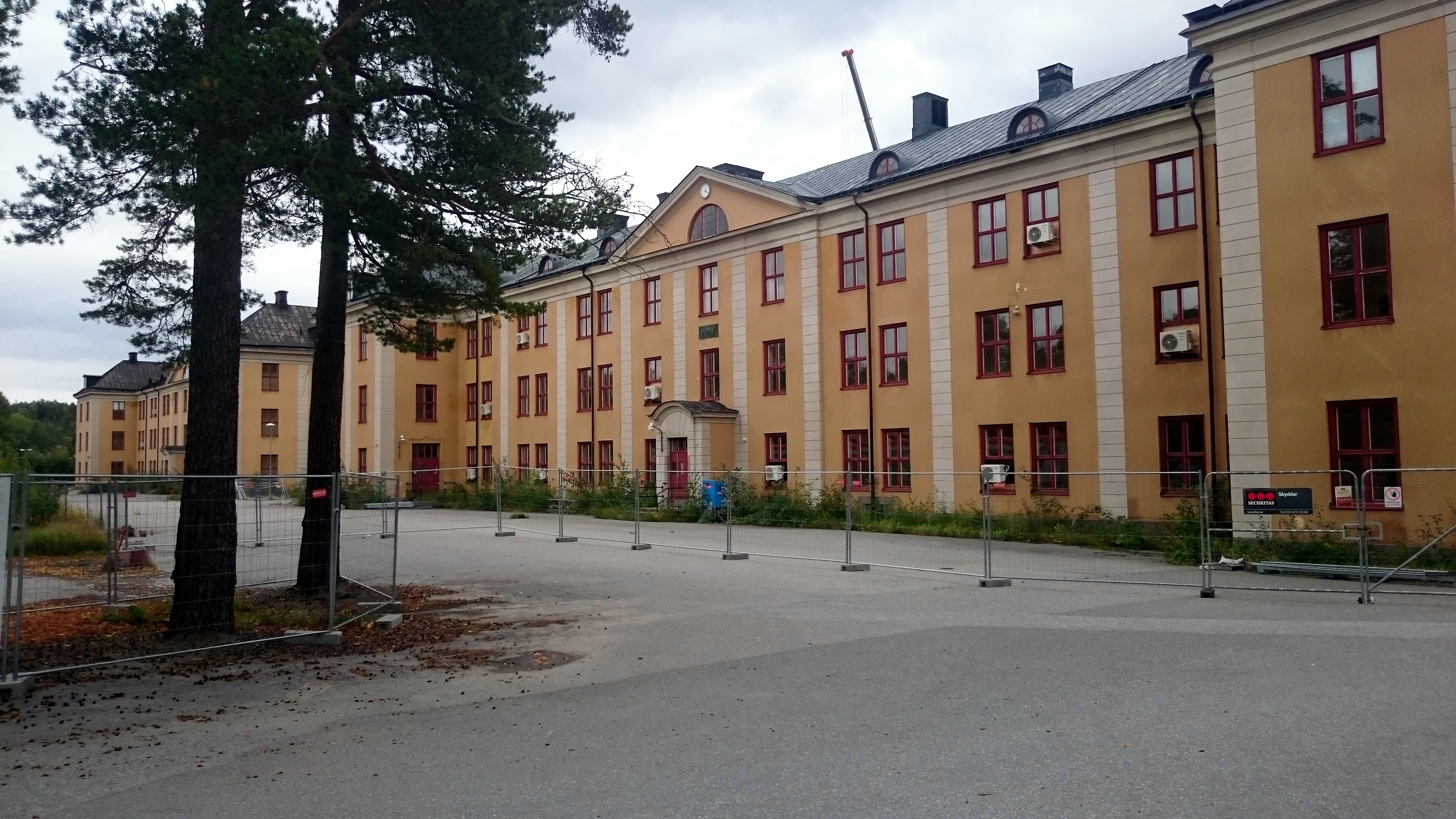
Former barracks in Vaxholm.

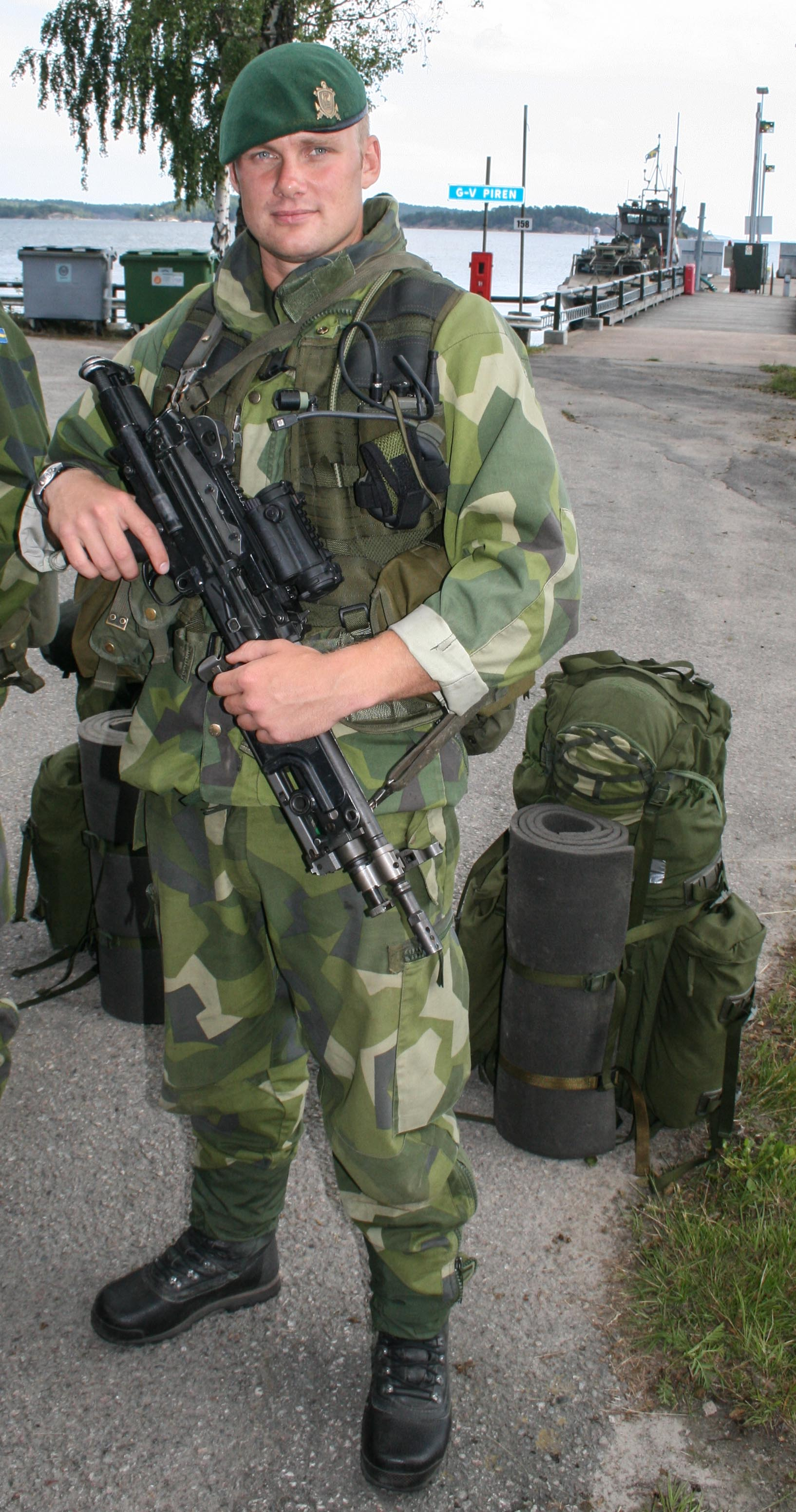
Soldier at Berga Naval Base.

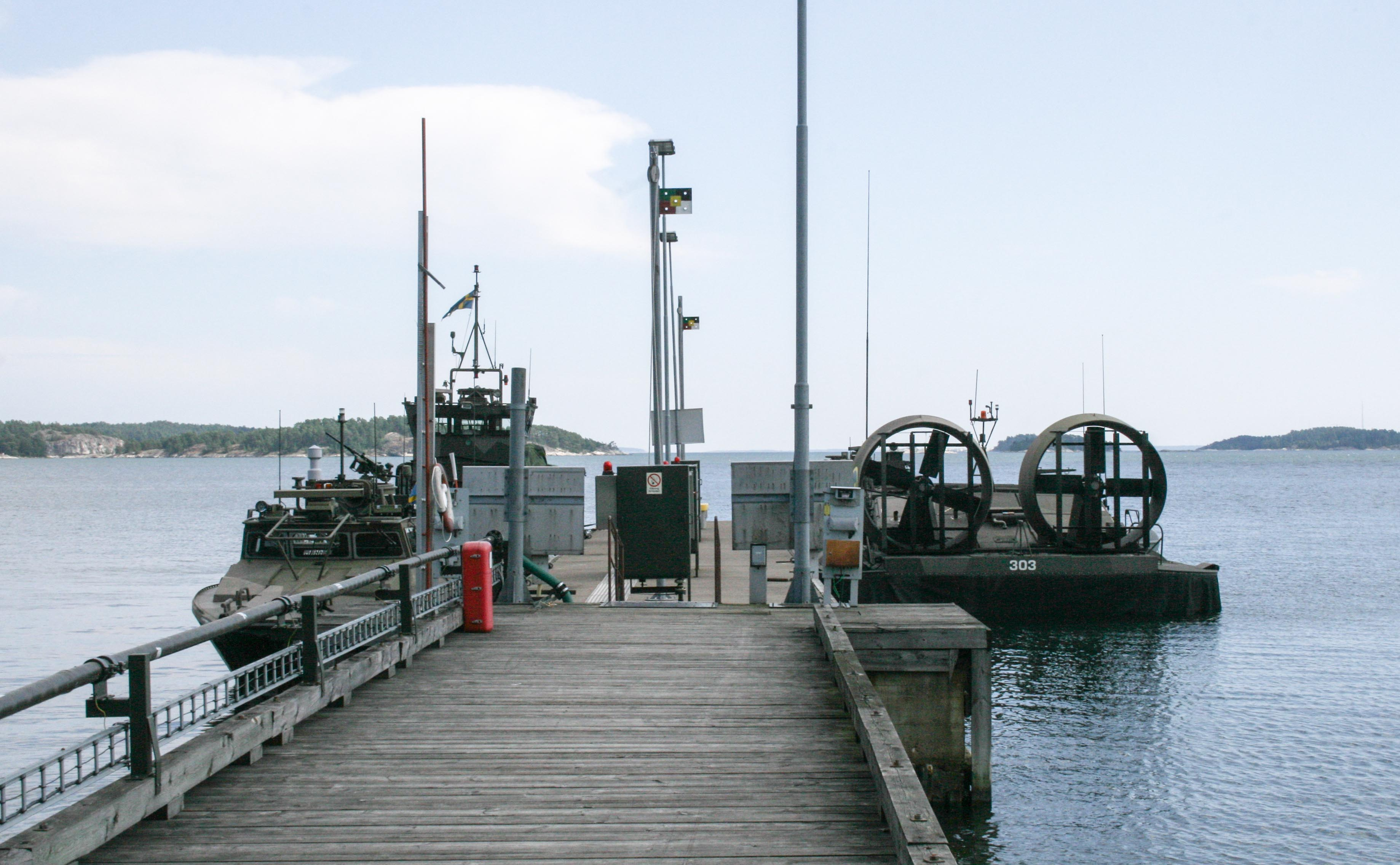
Combat Boat 90 and Griffon 8100TD at Berga Naval Base.

=== Training grounds ===
The regiment uses the following training areas: Askö, Berga, Korsö, Mellsten, Roten, Stabbo, Tofta, Utö and Väddö.

== Heraldry and traditions ==
=== Colours, standards and guidons ===
Vaxholm Amphibian Regiment initially carried the colour which until 30 June 2000 was carried by the Vaxholm Coastal Artillery Regiment (KA 1). On 12 June 2003, the regiment was presented with a new colour by His Majesty the King and Prince Carl Philip, Duke of Värmland at Vaxholm Fortress. Blazon: "On red cloth in the centre the badge of the former Coastal Artillery; two gun barrels of older pattern in saltire between a royal crown proper and a blazing grenade and waves, all in yellow. In the first corner the badge of the town Vaxholm; from a wavy base the front of a sailing ship and a tower issuant, both white, in the second corner the provincial badge of Gotland; a white ram passant, armed yellow, a yellow crosstaff and a red banner with edging and five flaps in yellow (a legacy from the former Gotland Coastal Artillery Regiment, KA 3)." The colour was drawn by Kristina Holmgård-Åkerberg and embroidered by hand in insertion technique by Maj-Britt Salander, company Blå Kusten.

On 5 September 2005, the commanding officer of Älvsborg Amphibian Regiment (Amf 4), colonel Stefan Gustafsson, presented its colour to the commanding officer of the 1st Amphibian Regiment, colonel Lars-Olof Corneliusson. The colour has since been carried by the amphibian detachment in Gothenburg. On 27 January 2017, the unit was presented with a new colour, which then replaced the 2003 colour. The colour was handed over by His Majesty the King, and was received by colonel Peder Ohlsson at the regiment headquarters at Berga. The colour bears a motif of two gun barrels of older pattern in saltire between a royal crown proper and a blazing grenade and waves. Embroidery is made in yellow on a red background. The upper left corner shows the badge of Vaxholm and in the lower left corner the badge of Gotland. It took 1,204 hours to manufacture the colour and it was delivered by the Swedish Army Museum.

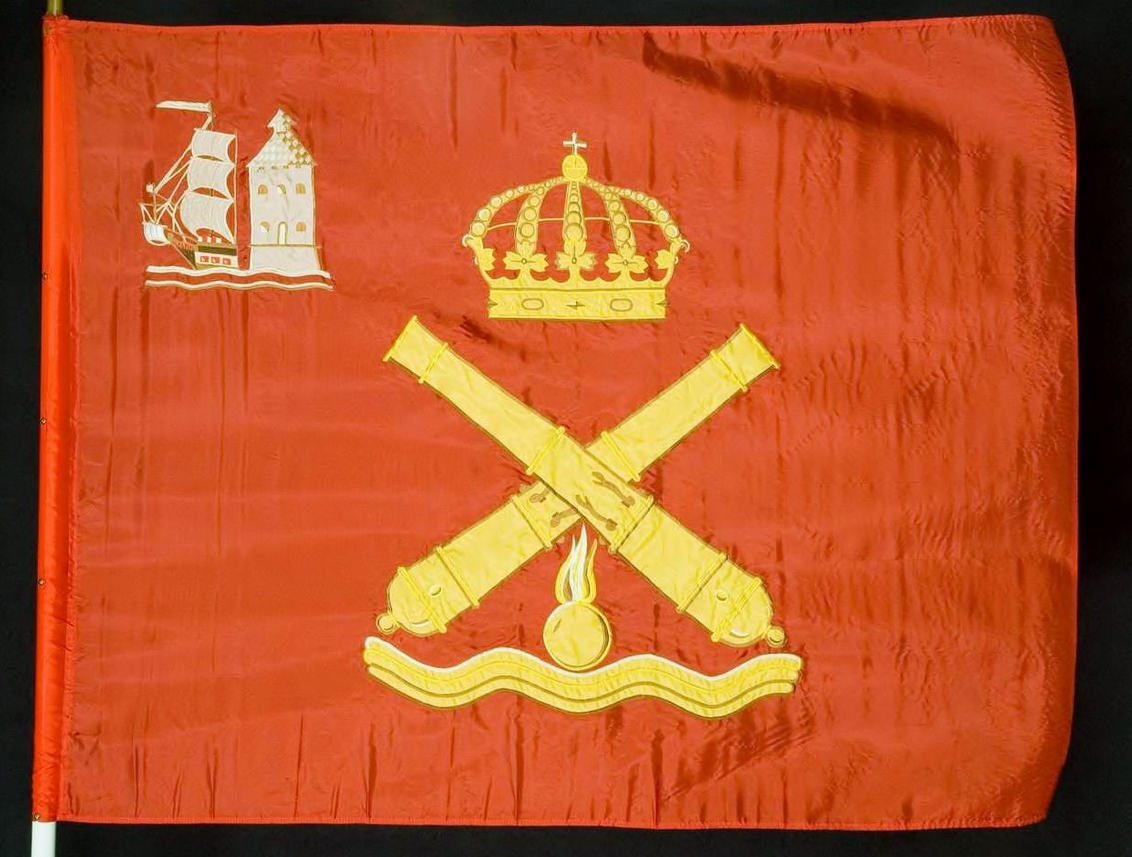
Pre-2003 regimental colour

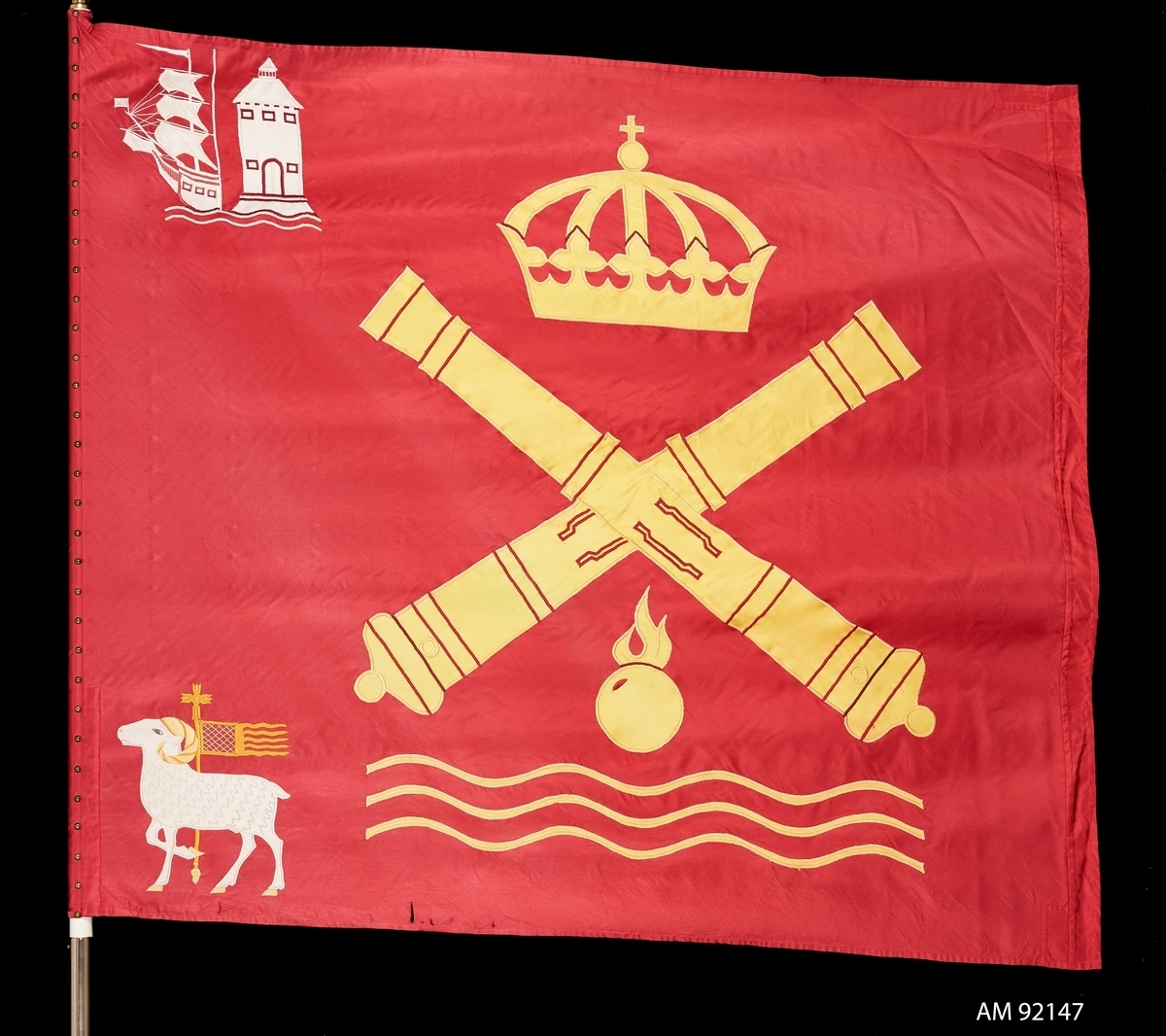
2003–2017 regimental colour

=== Medals and insignias ===
In 2000, the Vaxholms amfibieregemente (Amf 1) förtjänstmedalj ("Vaxholm Amphibious Regiment (Amf 1) Medal for Merit") in gold and silver (VaxamfregGM/SM) of the 8th size was established. The medal ribbon is of blue moiré with a yellow stripe towards each edge and a yellow line on the middle followed on both sides by first a green stripe and then a yellow line.

In 2005, the Amfibieregementets förtjänstmedalj ("Amphibian Regiment Medal of Merit") in bronze (designation: AmfregBM) was established, which was awarded to staff who left in connection with the Defense Act of 2004.

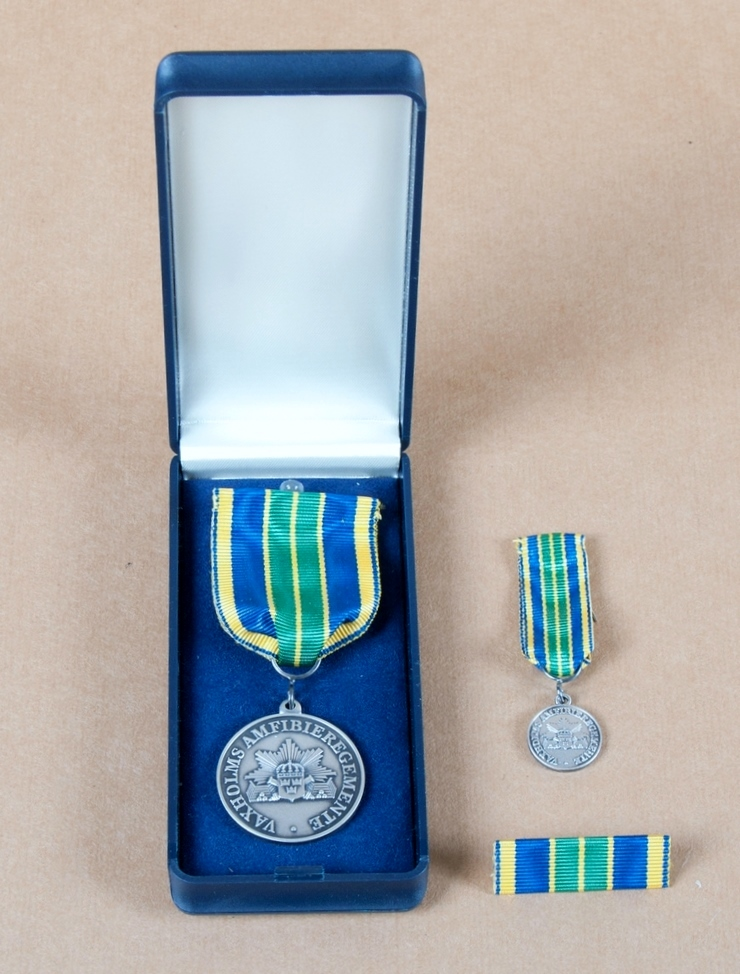
Vaxholm Amphibious Regiment (Amf 1) Medal for Merit in silver

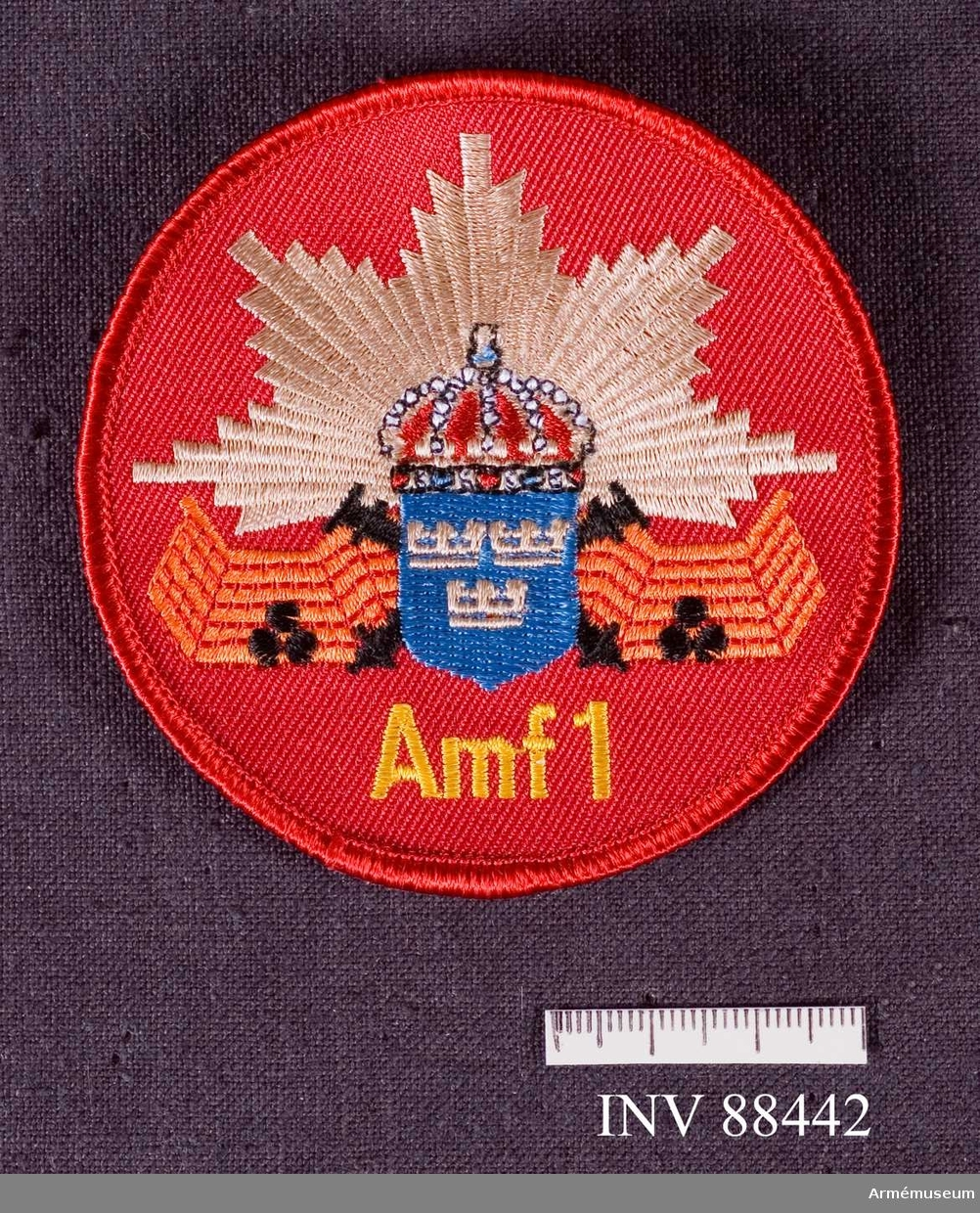
Military patch

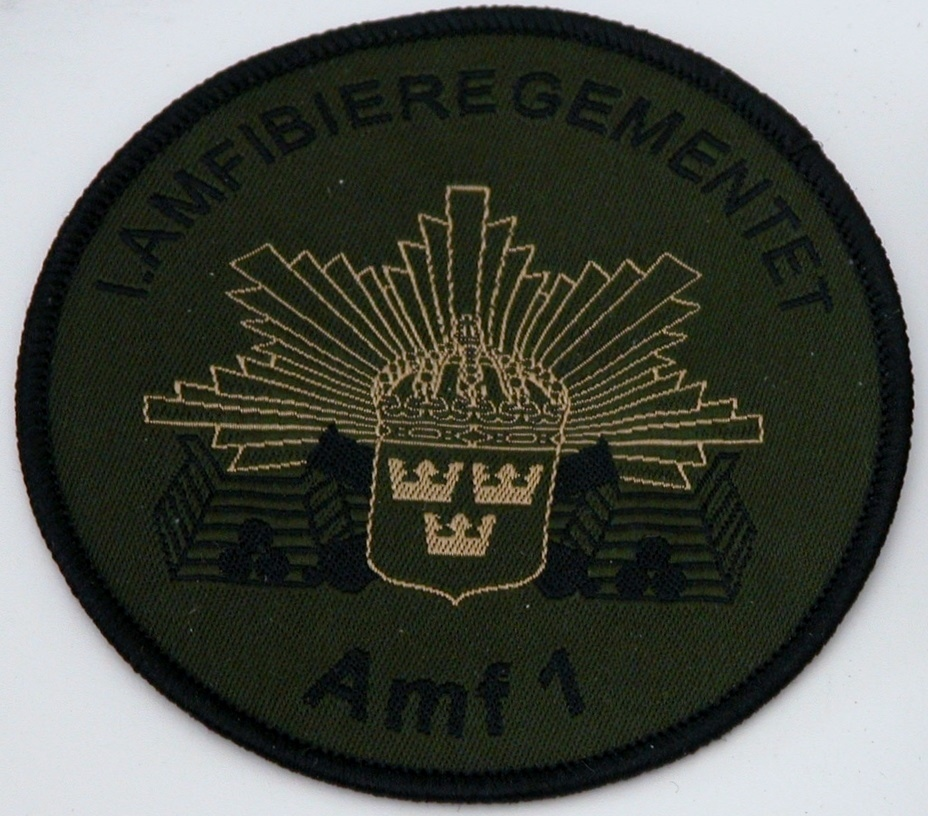
Military patch

=== Heritage ===
The regiment is primarily responsible for the tradition of the Älvsborg Amphibian Regiment (Amf 4), Södertörn Marine Brigade (SMB) and Gotland Regiment (P 18) as well as older ships, who bear the same name as the regiment's current ships. Secondly, the regiment is responsible for the tradition of all older amphibian and coastal artillery units, that is to say, the coastal defense defence (BK, GbK, SK, GK/KA 3, NK/KA 5), coastal artillery regiments/corps (KA 1, KA 2, KA 3, KA 4 and KA 5) as well as the Roslagen Marine Brigade (RMB). The responsibility of the traditions for Gotland Regiments (P 18), Roslagen Marine Brigade and Södertörn Marine Brigade rests on the home guard battalions at Gotland Group (Gotlandsgruppen, GLG) and the Södertörn Group (Södertörnsgruppen, UGS).

== Commanding officers ==
- 2000–2002: Colonel Bengt Andersson
- 2002–2004: Colonel Lars-Olof Corneliusson
- 2004–2009: Colonel Jonas Olsson
- 2010–2013: Colonel Ola Truedsson
- 2013–2014: Lieutenant colonel Jens Ribestrand (acting) (Note: Ribestrand took command as acting regimental commander and garrison commander on 9 September 2013, with an appointment until the 23 January 2014.)
- 2014–2018: Colonel Peder Ohlsson
- 2018–2022: Colonel Patrik Gardesten (Note: Gardesten took command on 18 January 2018, with an appointment until the 31 March 2022.)
- 2022–2024: Colonel Adam Camél (Note: Camél took command on 14 January 2022, with an appointment until the 31 January 2025.)
- 2024–20xx: Colonel David Saflind (Note: Camél took command on 1 February 2024, with an appointment until the 31 January 2027.)
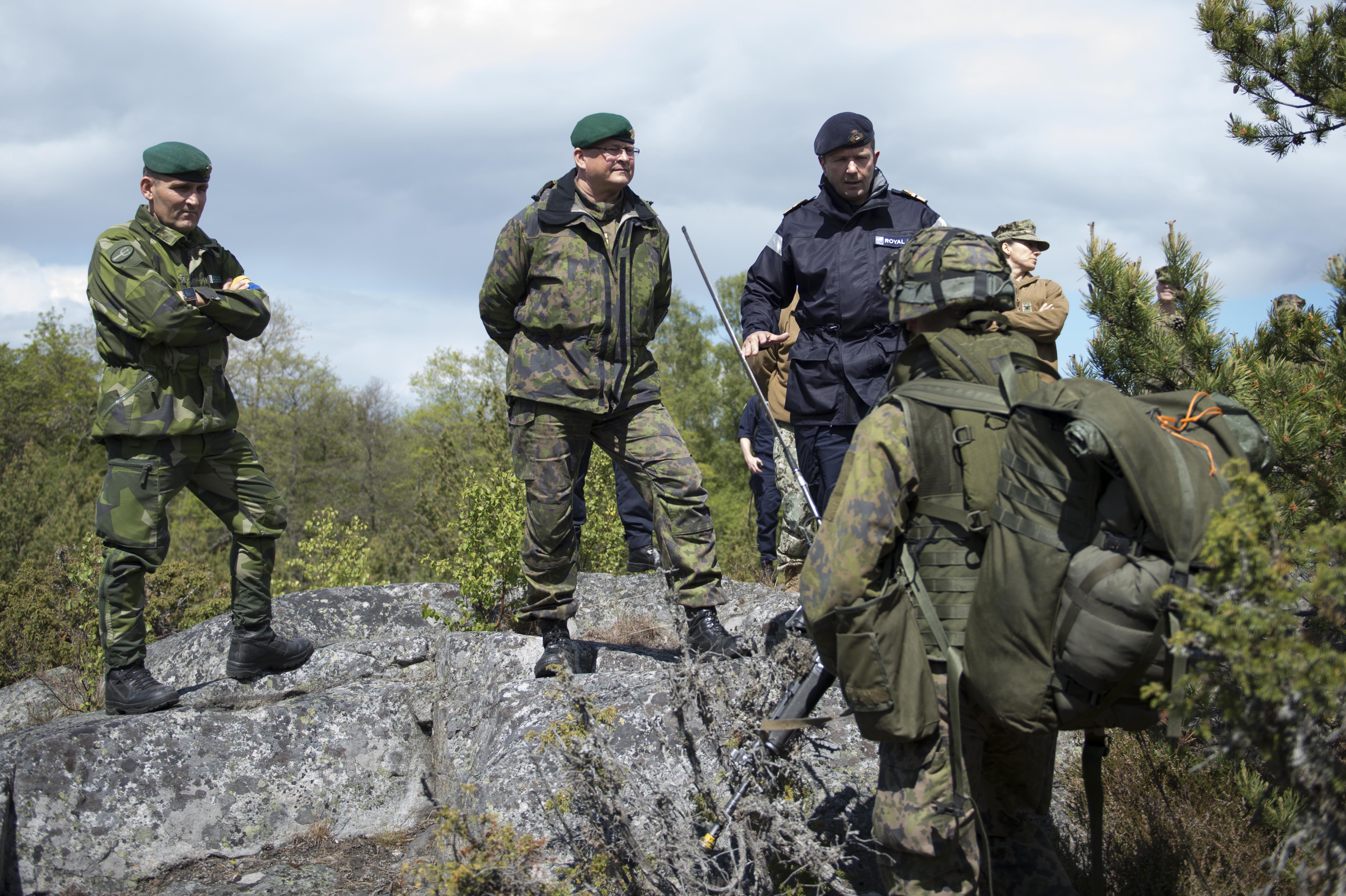
Colonel Peder Ohlsson (left) in 2016.

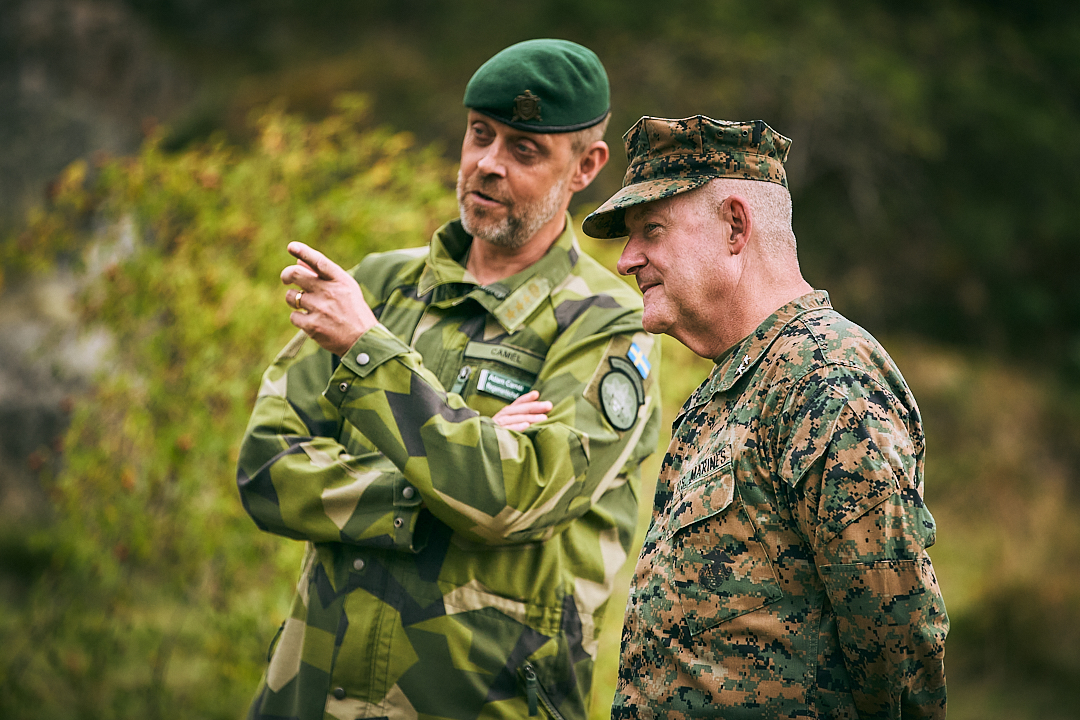
Colonel Adam Camél (left) in 2023.

== Names, designations and locations ==
Name	Translation	From		To
Vaxholms amfibieregemente	Vaxholm Amphibian Regiment	2000-07-01	–	2005-10-03
Första amfibieregementet	1st Amphibian Regiment	2005-10-03	–	2006-06-30
Amfibieregementet	1st Marine Regiment	2006-07-01	–	2021-09-30
Stockholms amfibieregemente	1st Marine Regiment	2021-10-01	–	
Designation		From		To
Amf 1		2000-07-01	–	
Location		From		To
Vaxholm Garrison/Rindö		2000-07-01	–	2006-06-30
Haninge Garrison/Berga		2005-01-01	–	
