= Director of Communication and Public Affairs =

Swedish Armed Forces officer

- Kommunikationsdirektör
- Incumbent; RAdm Fredrik Peedu since 10 February 2025
- Swedish Armed Forces
- Type: Director of communications and public affairs
- Abbreviation: KOMDIR
- Member of: Defence Board
- Reports to: Chief of the Defence Staff
- Seat: Swedish Armed Forces Headquarters, Lidingövägen 24, Stockholm
- Term length: No fixed term
- Constituting instrument: FFS 2013:4, Chapter 14; FFS 2016:2, Chapter 8 FIB 2020:5, Chapter 8
- First holder: Staffan Dopping

The Director of Communication and Public Affairs (Swedish: Kommunikationsdirektör, KOMDIR, previously Informationsdirektör, INFODIR) is the director of communications of the Swedish Armed Forces, in charge of public affairs. KOMDIR, which heads the Defence Staff's Communications Department (Note: Försvarsstabens kommunikationsavdelning (FST KOMM). Previously called the Defence Staff's Communications Department (Ledningsstabens kommunikationsavdelning, LEDS KOMM) and the Office of Communication and Public Affairs (Informationsstaben, INFOS)), is an administrative position based at the Swedish Armed Forces Headquarters in Stockholm. The KOMDIR is part of the Defence Board (Försvarsmaktsledningen, FML), a group of the Supreme Commander's top commanders.

== Tasks ==
The Director of Communication and Public Affairs shall lead the Swedish Armed Forces' military strategic communication within the framework of the Armed Forces' Strategic Direction (Försvarsmaktens Strategiska Inriktning, FMSI), the Armed Forces' Operational Plan (Försvarsmaktens verksamhetsplan, FMVP), the Defence Plan (Försvarsplanen, FP) and the Armed Forces Order (Försvarsmaktsorder, FMO). The task includes supporting the agency's command, commander directly subordinate to the Supreme Commander of the Swedish Armed Forces, the Chief of Army, Chief of Navy and the Chief of Air Force, the Chief of Communications and Information Systems (Ledningssystemchefen), the Chief of Defence Logistics, the Chief of Home Guard, the Assistant Chief of Armed Forces Training & Procurement and military regional commanders in public affairs matters.

The Director of Communication and Public Affairs is authorized to be a spokesperson for the Swedish Armed Forces and to be the publisher in charge responsible for the Armed Forces' magazine Försvarets Forum and the Armed Forces' website forsvarsmakten.se as well as the Armed Forces' accounts on social media. The Director of Communication and Public Affairs represents the Armed Forces in contacts with other authorities and organizations regarding communications issues.

The Director of Communication and Public Affairs must prepare documentation for the orientation of the communications service and marketing communications in the Armed Forces' Strategic Direction (Försvarsmaktens Strategiska Inriktning, FMSI), the Armed Forces' Operational Plan (Försvarsmaktens verksamhetsplan, FMVP), the Defence Plan (Försvarsplanen, FP) and the Armed Forces Order (Försvarsmaktsorder, FMO).

The Director of Communication and Public Affairs decides on development and management of the Swedish Armed Forces' trademark as well as name, profile and image, handbooks in the field of communications and on the Armed Forces' sponsorship.

The Director of Communication and Public Affairs is authorized to enter into agreements and contracts with government agencies, municipalities, regions, organizations and individuals.

Until 2020, KOMDIR/INFODIR was directly subordinate to the Supreme Commander of the Swedish Armed Forces. From 2020, KOMDIR reported to the Chief of Defence Staff and from 2023 the Chief of the Defence Staff.

== Directors of Communication and Public Affairs ==
No.	Portrait	Director	Took office	Left office	Time in office	Defence branch	Supreme Commander	Ref.
Director of Communication and Public Affairs (Informationsdirektör, INFODIR)
1	Staffan Dopping	Staffan Dopping (born 1956)	2005	September 2008	2–3 years	–	Håkan Syrén	
2	Erik Lagersten	Captain (N); Erik Lagersten (born 1966)	8 December 2008	30 September 2015	6 years, 296 days	Navy	Håkan Syrén; Sverker Göranson	
–	Pär Zakariasson	Colonel; Pär Zakariasson (born 1963); Acting	1 October 2015	31 January 2016	122 days	Army	Micael Bydén	
3	Marcela Sylvander [sv]	Marcela Sylvander (born 1966)	13 May 2016 (Note: The employment started no later than 13 May 2016.)	2018	1–2 years	–	Micael Bydén	
Director of Communication and Public Affairs (Kommunikationsdirektör, KOMDIR)
–	Mats Ström	Brigadier general Mats Ström; Acting	11 August 2018	31 August 2019	1 year, 20 days	Army	Micael Bydén	
4	Mats Ström	Brigadier general Mats Ström	1 September 2019	31 August 2022	2 years, 364 days	Army	Micael Bydén	
5	Peder Ohlsson	Brigadier general Peder Ohlsson (born 1962)	1 September 2022	30 September 2023	1 year, 29 days	Navy (Amphibious Corps)	Micael Bydén	
6	Anna Siverstig	Brigadier general Anna Siverstig (born 1970)	1 October 2023	February 2025	1–2 years	Air Force	Micael Bydén; Michael Claesson	
7	Fredrik Peedu	Rear admiral (lower half); Fredrik Peedu (born ?)	10 February 2025	Incumbent	1 year, 211 days	Navy	Michael Claesson	
