= Staffan Dopping =

Swedish journalist

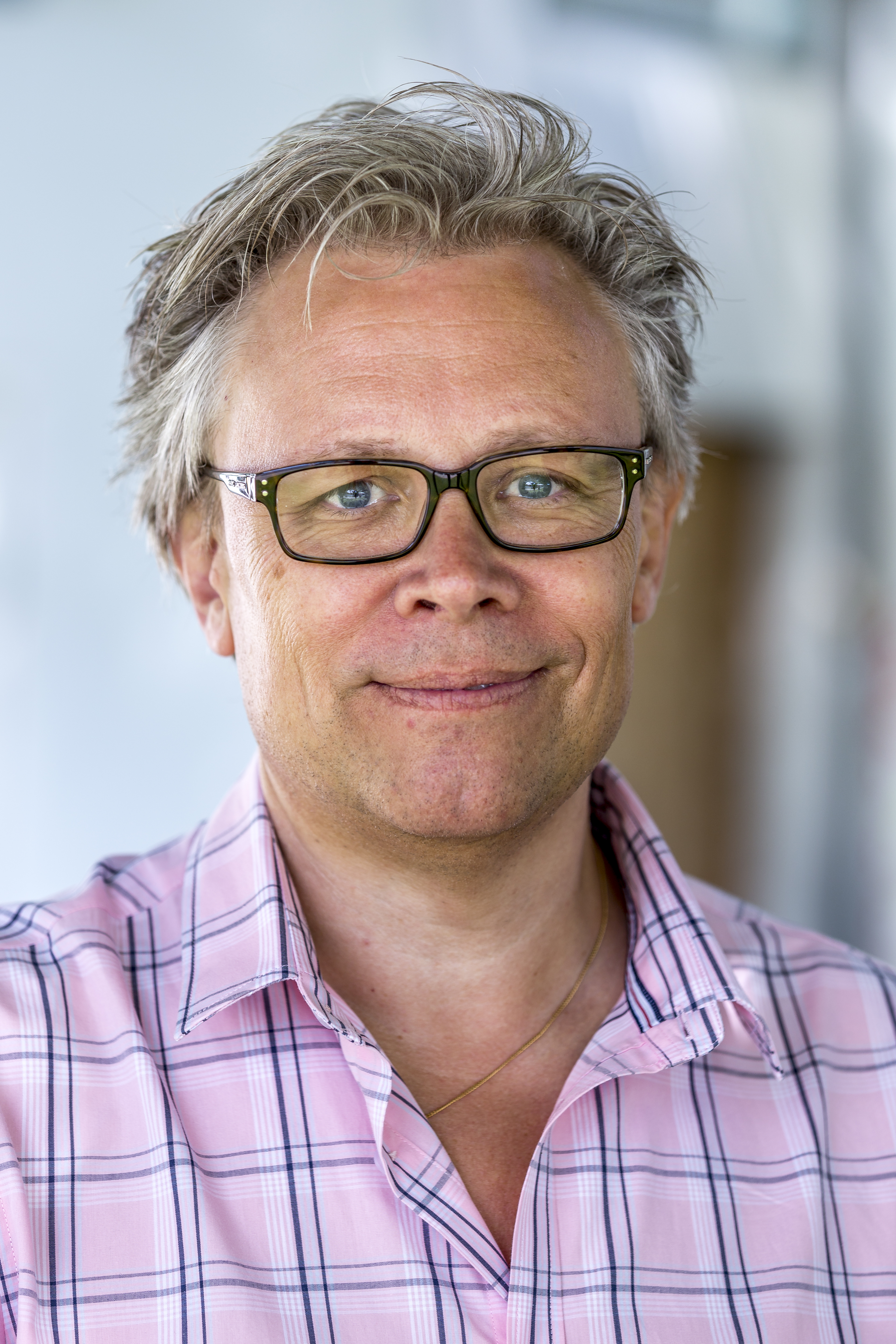
Staffan Dopping in Almedalen, June 2013

Staffan Dopping (born 16 June 1956) is a Swedish journalist.

== Education ==
Dopping studied at Journalisthögskolan in Stockholm.

== Work ==
Dopping has worked as a journalist and host for many of the largest media companies in Sweden, like Tidningarnas Telegrambyrå, Sveriges Television, TV4 and Sveriges Radio (including Studio Ett and Spanarna). His work stretches over a broad spectrum from both light and intellectual entertainment, to long format interviews with politicians and academics.

From 2005 to 2008, Dopping worked as Director of Communication and Public Affairs at the Swedish Armed Forces, and from 2010 to 2015 he worked at, and became a partner in, the PR-firm K-Street Advisors.

Since mid 2017, Dopping writes a column in the magazine Språktidningen with focus on language.

Since mid 2018, Dopping works at Kvartal, an independent media house, where he conducts long format interviews in Fredagsintervjun and hosts the weekly program Veckopanelen.

== Awards ==
Dopping was awarded Sveriges Radios language award and Ikarospriset.

== Bibliography ==
- Inte lögn, inte sant (2020) with Stig-Björn Ljunggren

Military offices
Preceded by None	Director of Communication and Public Affairs; 2005–2008	Succeeded by Erik Lagersten
