= 4th Marine Regiment (Sweden) =

Swedish amphibious unit

Coordinates: 57.676317°N 11.863483°E

- Älvsborgs amfibieregemente
- Active: 2000–2004; 2021–present
- Country: Sweden
- Branch: Swedish Navy
- Garrison/HQ: Gothenburg
- Motto: "Västkustens styrka och stolthet"
- Beret colour: Commando green
- March: "I beredskap" (S. Rydberg) (Note: The march was inherited from Älvsborg Coastal Artillery Regiment.)
- Mascot: Torleif

Commanders
- Current commander: COL Oscar Peterson

Insignia
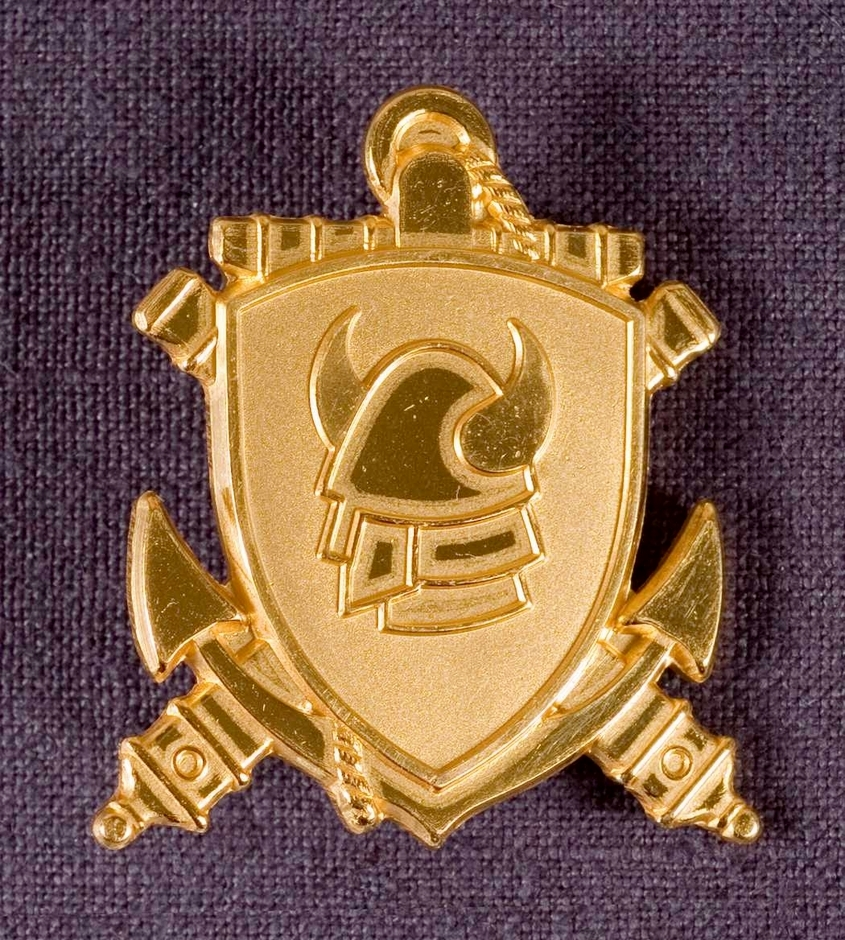
- Cap badge

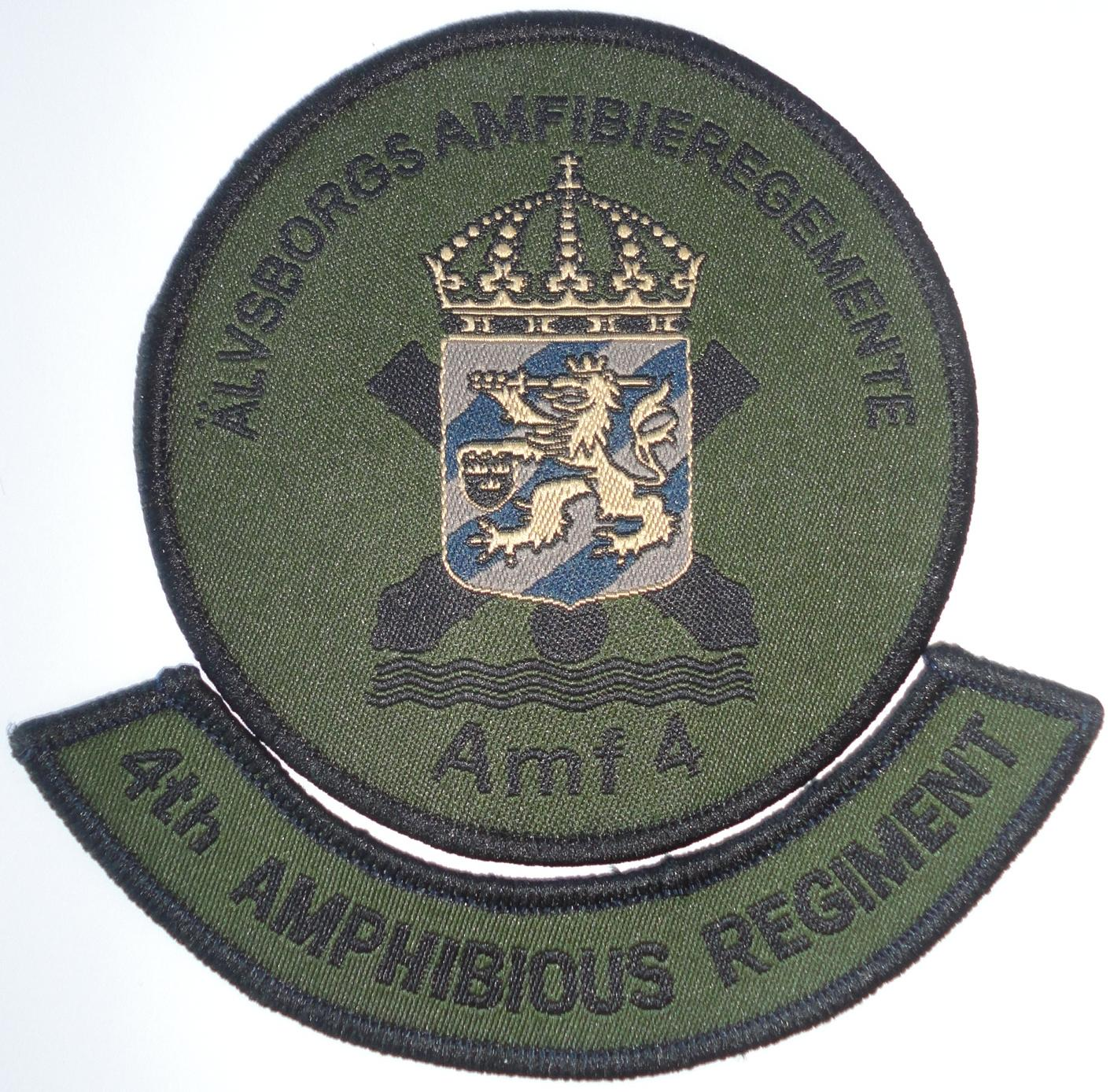
- Military patch

The 4th Marine Regiment (Swedish: Älvsborgs amfibieregemente, Amf 4) is one of two marine regiments of the Swedish Amphibious Corps based in Gothenburg. Raised from Älvsborg Coastal Artillery Regiment (KA 4) in 2000 when the Swedish Amphibious Corps was formed, the 4th Marine Regiment only operated for four years before being disbanded in 2004. The regiment was reinstated on 1 October 2021.

== History ==
Prior to the Defence Act of 2000, the Swedish government's starting point was that only two units were needed to meet the Swedish Armed Forces' future training of coastal artillery units. One unit was intended to be the main unit for the service branch. Prior to the Defence Act, there were four coastal artillery regiments, Vaxholm Coastal Artillery Regiment and the 1st Coastal Artillery Brigade (KA 1) in Vaxholm, Karlskrona Coastal Artillery Regiment and the 2nd Coastal Artillery Brigade (KA 2) in Karlskrona, Gotland Coastal Artillery Regiment (KA 3) on Gotland and Älvsborg Coastal Artillery Regiment (KA 4) in Gothenburg. The government considered that the coastal artillery regiment in Vaxholm would constitute the main unit of the Swedish Armed Forces' basic organization. As Vaxholm had an existing infrastructure close to the Stockholm archipelago with training areas, which was considered well-dimensioned for the terrain types the unit is expected to operate in. Further arguments for retaining Vaxholm were to maintain coordination with other marine units in the Stockholm area. The government also found that the other coastal artillery regiments lacked the prerequisites to form the main unit for the coastal artillery.

The question of what the other unit that would remain as a support unit for Vaxholm was between the coastal artillery regiments in Karlskrona and Gothenburg. In the overall assessment, it was considered that greater investments in both Gothenburg and Karlskrona would be required, as they both lacked the type of training areas that Vaxholm had. On the other hand, both were considered suitable as a support unit for Vaxholm. The government's choice was Gothenburg. Among other things, with the argument that Gothenburg as Sweden's second biggest city needed a military presence. Also the central location in Western Sweden, seen from a conscription travel perspective, contributed to the coastal artillery regiment in Gothenburg. The coastal artillery regiment on Gotland was never relevant to either a main unit or a support unit. As a result, Vaxholm Coastal Artillery Regiment and the 1st Coastal Artillery Brigade (KA 1) in Vaxholm and Älvsborg Coastal Artillery Regiment (KA 4) in Gothenburg remained in the basic organization while Karlskrona Coastal Artillery Regiment and the 2nd Coastal Artillery Brigade (KA 2) in Karlskrona and Gotland Coastal Artillery Regiment (KA 3) on Gotland were disbanded.

With the Defence Act, the fixed coastal artillery was disbanded, and the remaining units instead became amphibious units where the two coastal artillery regiments were reorganized into amphibious regiments, which organized an amphibious brigade staff and three amphibious battalions. On 30 June the Swedish Coastal Artillery was disbanded, and on 1 July 2000, the Swedish Amphibious Corps was formed with 1st Marine Regiment (Amf 1), 2nd Marine Regiment (Amf 4) and the Amphibious Combat School (Amfibiestridsskolan, AmfSS).

Prior to the Defence Act of 2004, the government felt that only one platform for training amphibious units in the basic organization was needed where the government considered that the 1st Marine Regiment (Amf 1) in Vaxholm should be maintained. Among other things, when referring to the government's bill 1999/2000:30, where the government highlighted Vaxholm as the main platform because of the good practice conditions in the Stockholm archipelago, and that the valuation that was then made was still valid. It was then found that the regiment in Gothenburg had limited training conditions. Hence, the government proposed to the Riksdag that the regiment should be disbanded. However, in the future it was considered important to continue to train units that could perform and operate on the Swedish West Coast. This meant that the installation at Känsö would be maintained, and constitute a detachment to the 1st Marine Regiment.

On 31 December 2004, the 4th Marine Regiment was disbanded, and from 1 January 2005, the regiment was transferred to a decommissioning organization until the disbandment was completed by 30 June 2006. On 5 September 2005, the commanding officer of the 4th Marine Regiment handed its colour over to the commanding officer of the 1st Marine Regiment. Remaining in Gothenburg was the decommissioning organization, which operated until 30 June 2006. After the basic training of the regiment ceased, a detachment was formed with the 17th Amphibious Patrol Boat Company (17. amfibiebevakningsbåtskompaniet) and the 132nd Naval Security Company (132. säkerhetskompani sjö) of the 1st Marine Regiment, as well as a Maritime Intelligence Company (Sjöinformationskompani) from the Naval Base in Karlskrona.

The unit was re-raised and was inaugurated on 1 October 2021 to the tunes from the Royal Swedish Navy Band. The unit was inaugurated by Her Royal Highness Victoria, Crown Princess of Sweden. The Supreme Commander of the Swedish Armed Forces, General Micael Bydén and the Minister of Defence Peter Hultqvist also attended the inauguration. Initially, the regiment will consist of almost 600 employees plus 300 conscripts, which means that it will be organizationally larger than the 1st Marine Regiment (Amf 1) right from the start. This is done by taking over the 17th Patrol Boat Company and the 132nd Naval Security Company, which already existed in Gothenburg. In addition, the 5th Amphibious Battalion is established. In the long term, Amf 4 will consist of approximately 900 employees and 300 conscripts.

== Units ==
=== Current units ===
- 5th Marine Battalion (5. amfibiebataljonen)
- 17th Patrol Boat Company (17. bevakningsbåtskompaniet)
- 132nd Naval Security Company (132. säkerhetskompani sjö)

== Heraldry and traditions ==
=== Coat of arms ===
The coat of arms of the 4th Marine Regiment was previously used by Älvsborg Coastal Artillery Regiment (KA 4) from 1942 to 1994 and by the Gothenburg Marine Brigade with Älvsborg Coastal Artillery Regiment (Göteborgs marinbrigad med Älvsborgs kustartilleriregemente, GMB) from 1994 to 2000. Blazon: "Azure, the regimental badge, three waves bendy-sinister argent, charged with a double-tailed crowned lion rampant or, armed and langued gules, in dexter forepaw a sword or and in sinister a shield azure charged with three open crowns or placed two and one. The shield surmounted two gunbarrels of older pattern in saltire above a flaming grenade and waves".

=== Colours, standards and guidons ===
The regimental colour was presented to the then Älvsborg Coastal Artillery Regiment (KA 4) at the Artillery Yard in Stockholm by the Chief of the Navy Staff, Vice Admiral Peter Nordbeck on 17 June 1995. The colour is drawn by Vladimir Sagerlund and embroidered by machine in appliqué technique by Engelbrektssons Flag factory. Blazon: "On red cloth in the centre the badge of the former Coastal Artillery; two gunbarrels of older pattern in saltire between a royal crown proper and a blazing grenade and waves, all in yellow. In the first corner the badge of the regiment; a crowned yellow lion rampant, in the right forepaw a yellow sword and in the left a blue shield with three yellow crowns placed two and one." At a simple ceremony on 5 September 2005 the commander of the 4th Marine Regiment, Colonel Stefan Gustafsson, handed the colour to the commander of the 1st Marine Regiment, Colonel Lars-Olof Corneliusson, who commanded the colour to be carried by the amphibious detachment in Gothenburg.

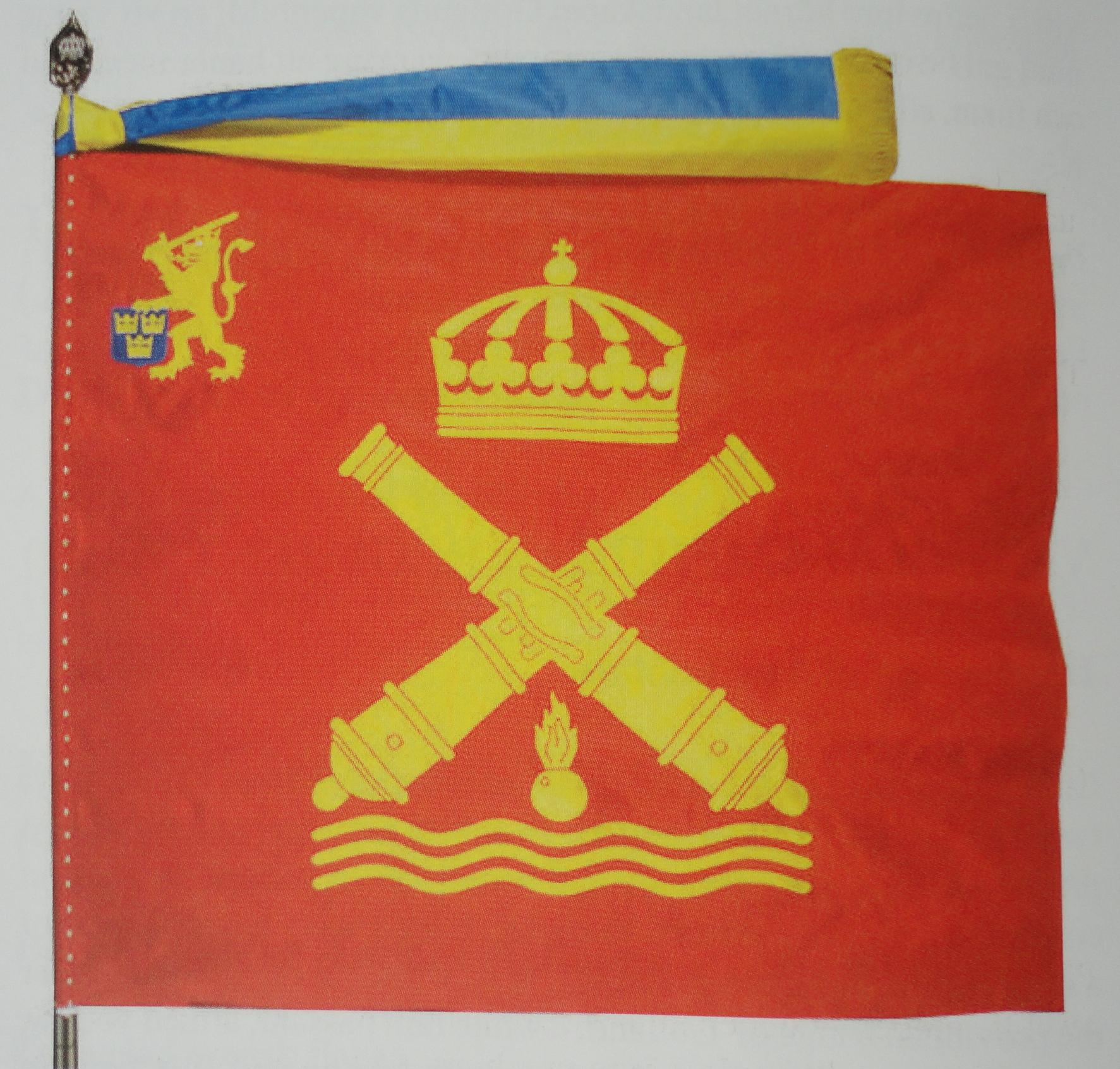
The 1995 regimental colour.

=== Medals ===
In 2001, the Älvsborgs amfibieregementes (Amf 4) förtjänstmedalj ("Älvsborg Amphibious regiment (Amf 4) Medal of Merit") in gold and silver (ÄlvsbamfregGM/SM) was established. It's a cross bottony of gold and red enamel. The medal ribbon is divided in blue, red and blue moiré with a yellow line in the middle of the blue fields. Before 2001, the medal was called Älvsborgs kustartilleriregementes (KA 4) förtjänstmedalj ("Älvsborg Coastal Artillery Regiment (KA 4) Medal of Merit") in gold (ÄlvsbkaregGM).

In 2005, the Älvsborgs amfibieregementes minnesmedalj ("Älvsborg Amphibious Regiment Commemorative Medal") in silver (ÄlvsbamfregMSM) was established. It's a cross moline in red enamel and gold. The medal ribbon is of blue moiré with red edges followed by a white stripe and with a broad yellow stripe in the middle.

Ribbon bar of the commemorative medal

== Commanding officers ==
- 2000–2003: Colonel Bo Andersson
- 2003–2005: Colonel Stefan Gustafsson
- 2005–2006: Lieutenant Colonel Hans-Richard Wijkmark (Note: Wijkmark was commanding officer of the Decommissioning Organization.)
- 2006–2021: –
- 2021–2025: Colonel Fredrik Herlitz
- 2025–20xx: Colonel Oscar Peterson

== Names, designations and locations ==
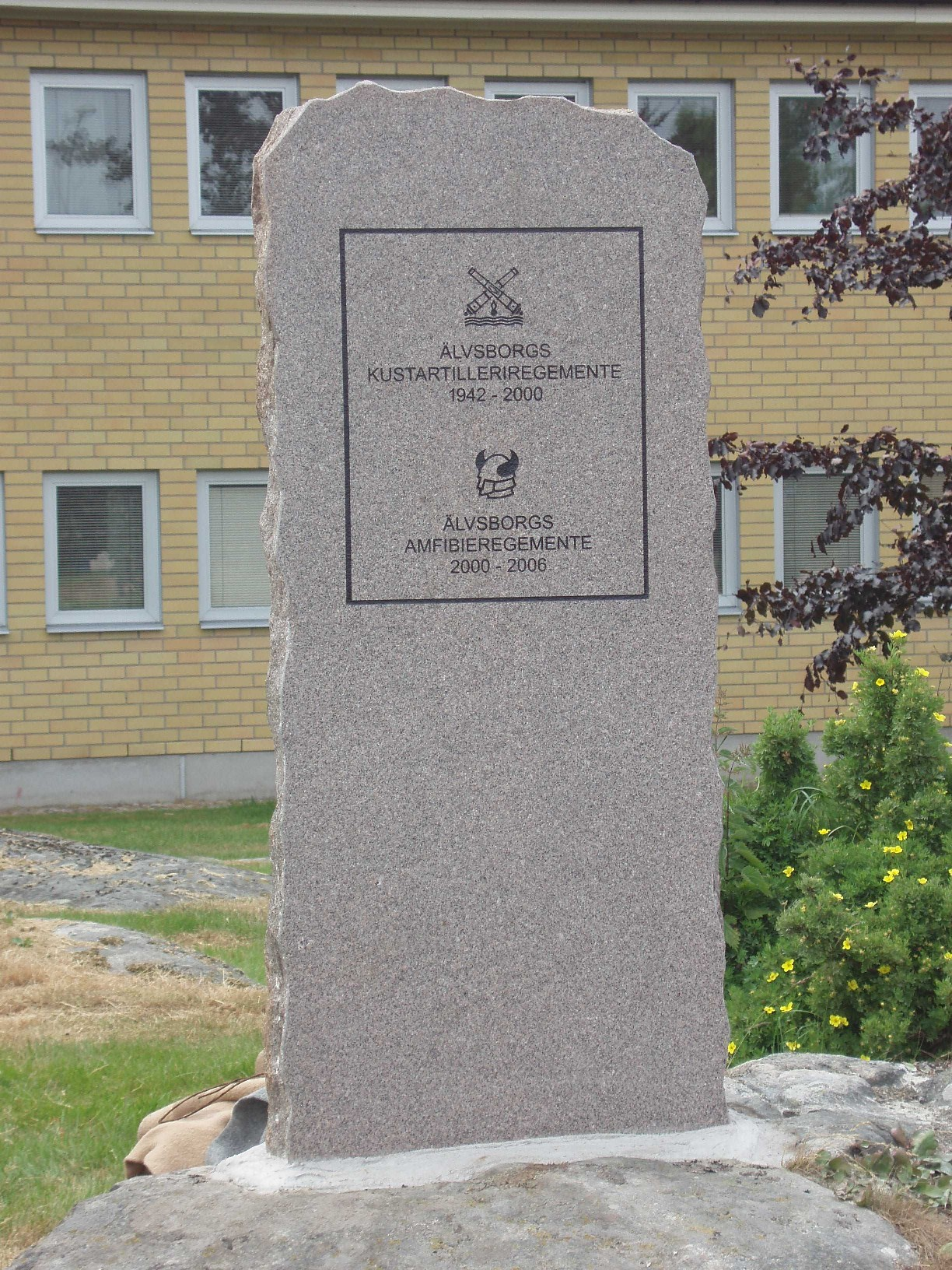
Memorial stone raised in June 2006.

Name	Translation	From		To
Älvsborgs amfibieregemente	4th Marine Regiment; Älvsborg Amphibian Regiment	2000-07-01	–	2004-12-31
Avvecklingsorganisation	Decommissioning Organization	2005-01-01	–	2006-06-30
Älvsborgs amfibieregemente	4th Marine Regiment; Älvsborg Amphibian Regiment	2021-10-01	–	
Designation		From		To
Amf 4		2000-07-01	–	2004-12-31
Ao Amf 4		2005-01-01	–	2006-06-30
Amf 4		2021-10-01	–	
Location		From		To
Gothenburg Garrison		2000-07-01	–	2006-06-30
Gothenburg Garrison		2021-10-01	–	
