= Utö, Sweden =

Island in Haninge Municipality, Sweden

Coordinates: 58°56′25″N 18°15′37″E

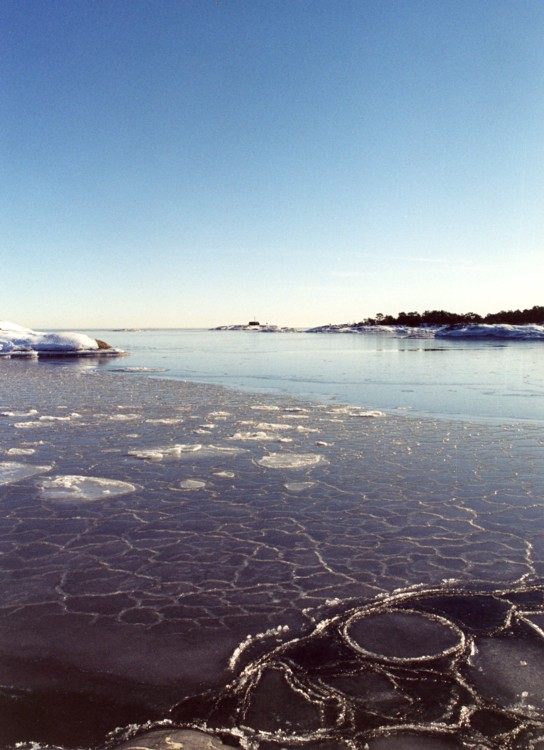
Utö, February 2003

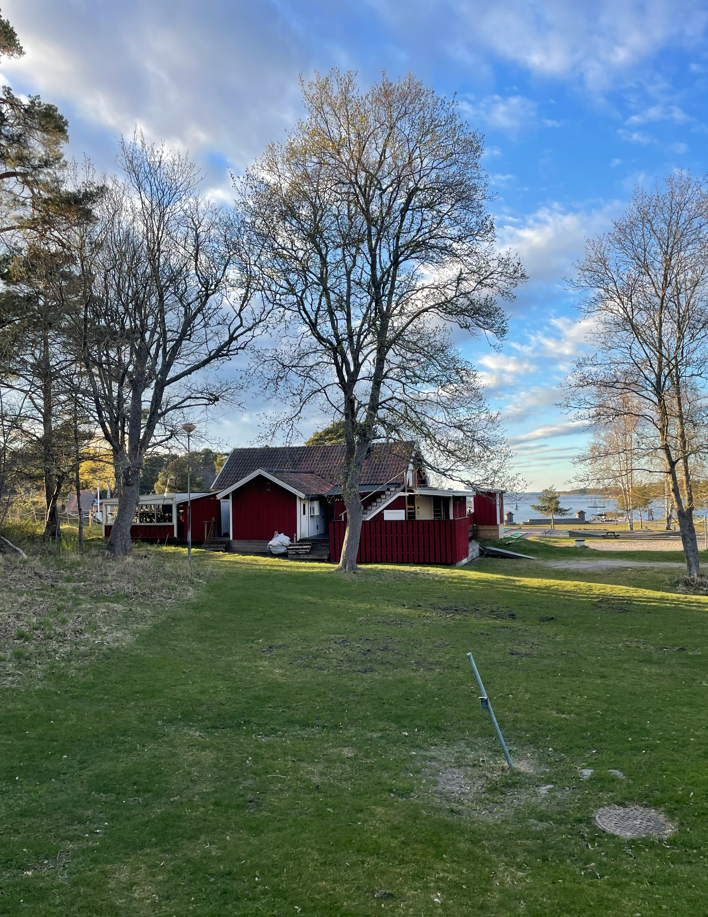
Landscape in the island of Utö in Sweden

Utö is a small island in the southwestern part of the Stockholm archipelago, known for its nature. Utö means "outer island" in Swedish. It is a part of Haninge Municipality.

== Geology ==
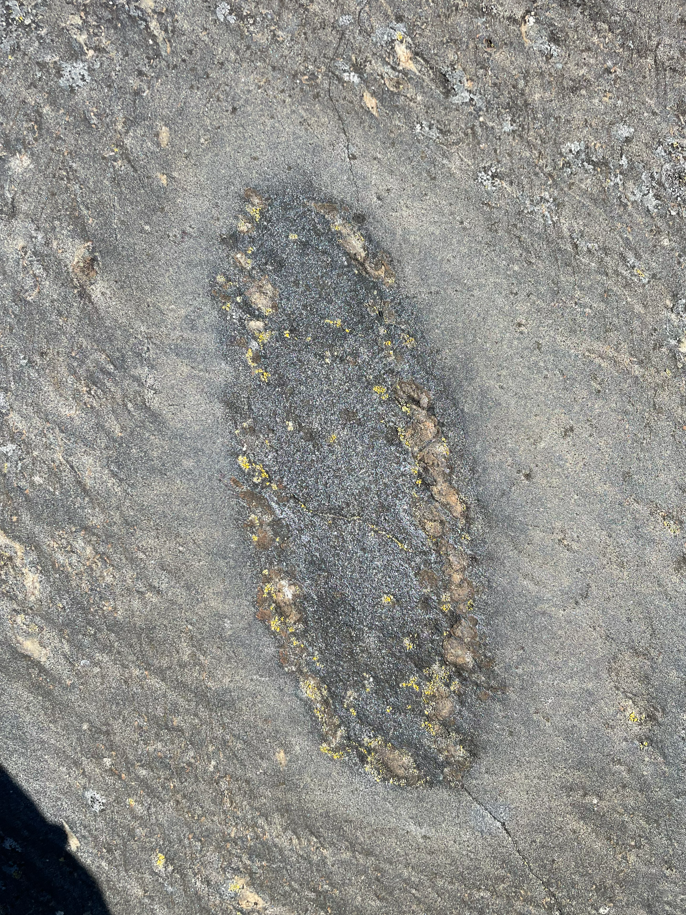
Rare iron - rich concretion in Utö

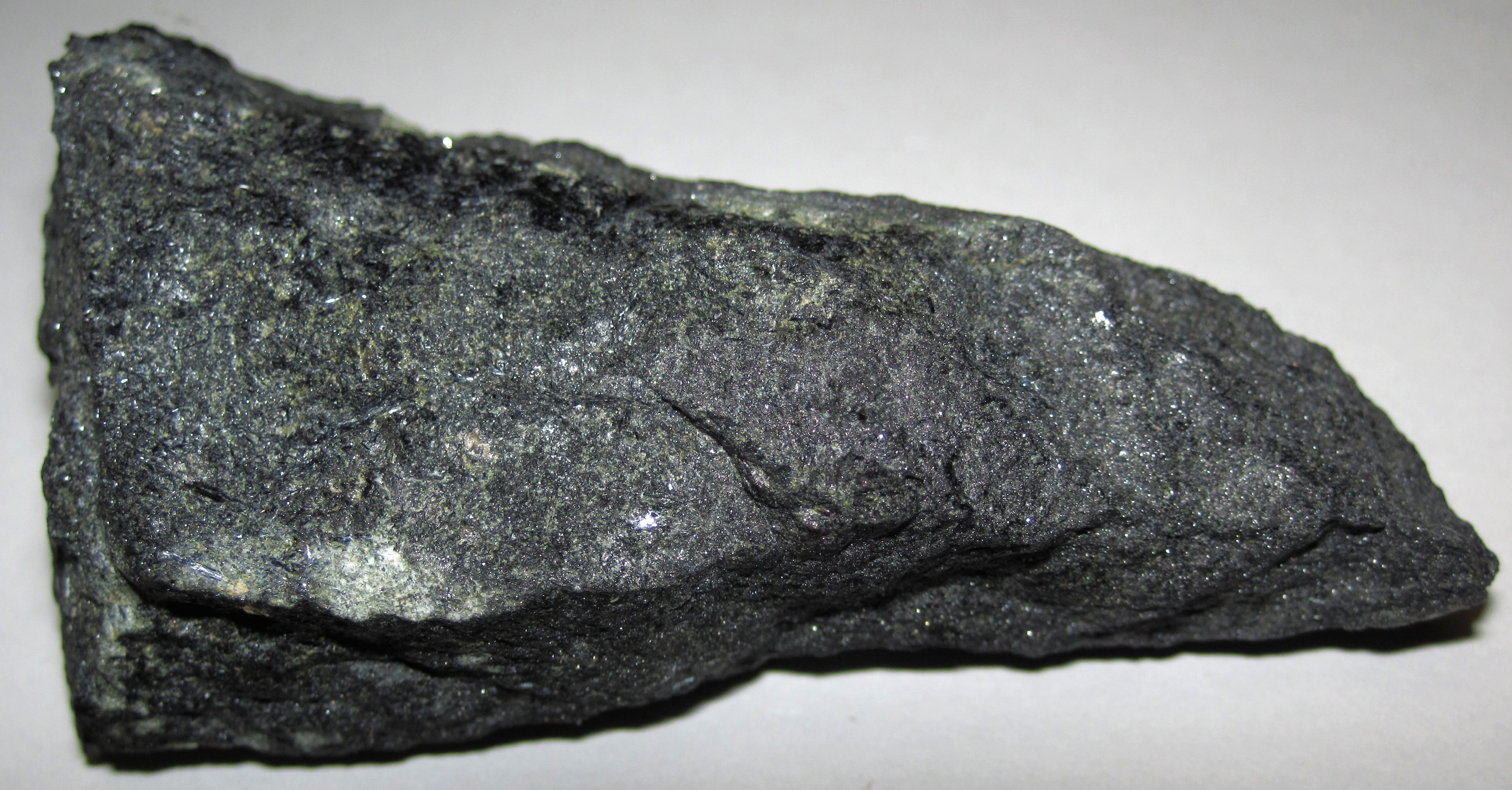
Magnetite iron ore, Utö Mines. An unusual metamorphic banded iron formation, last reset date 1.8 Ga (late Paleoproterozoic).

Utö and the surrounding islands are unique from a geological point of view and attract many people all-year round. Holmquistite is a kind of mineral that, in Sweden, can be found only on Utö and that is extremely rare globally with small occurrences in several countries in South America and Africa as well as in China, Australia, the USA and parts of Europe. It and many other kinds of minerals and stones are displayed at Utö Gruvmuseum, open daily in summertime in the afternoons.

== Geography ==
Dating of a piece of iron ore found on Gotland suggests that Utö might have one of the oldest iron-ore mines in Sweden.

In the southern parts of the island there is a live fire exercise field, Utö skjutfält. The field is administered by 1st Marine Regiment (Swedish: Amfibieregementet).

A landmark of Utö is its windmill, which is over 200 years old, and from which there is a good view of the bay Mysingen.

At Näsudden there are some remnants from 1719 when the Russians were burning down almost everything in the archipelago from Finland to the southern part of Sweden. When they were preparing food, they made a special kind of stove with an oven, which can be seen at Näsudden and Rånö.

=== Surrounding islands ===
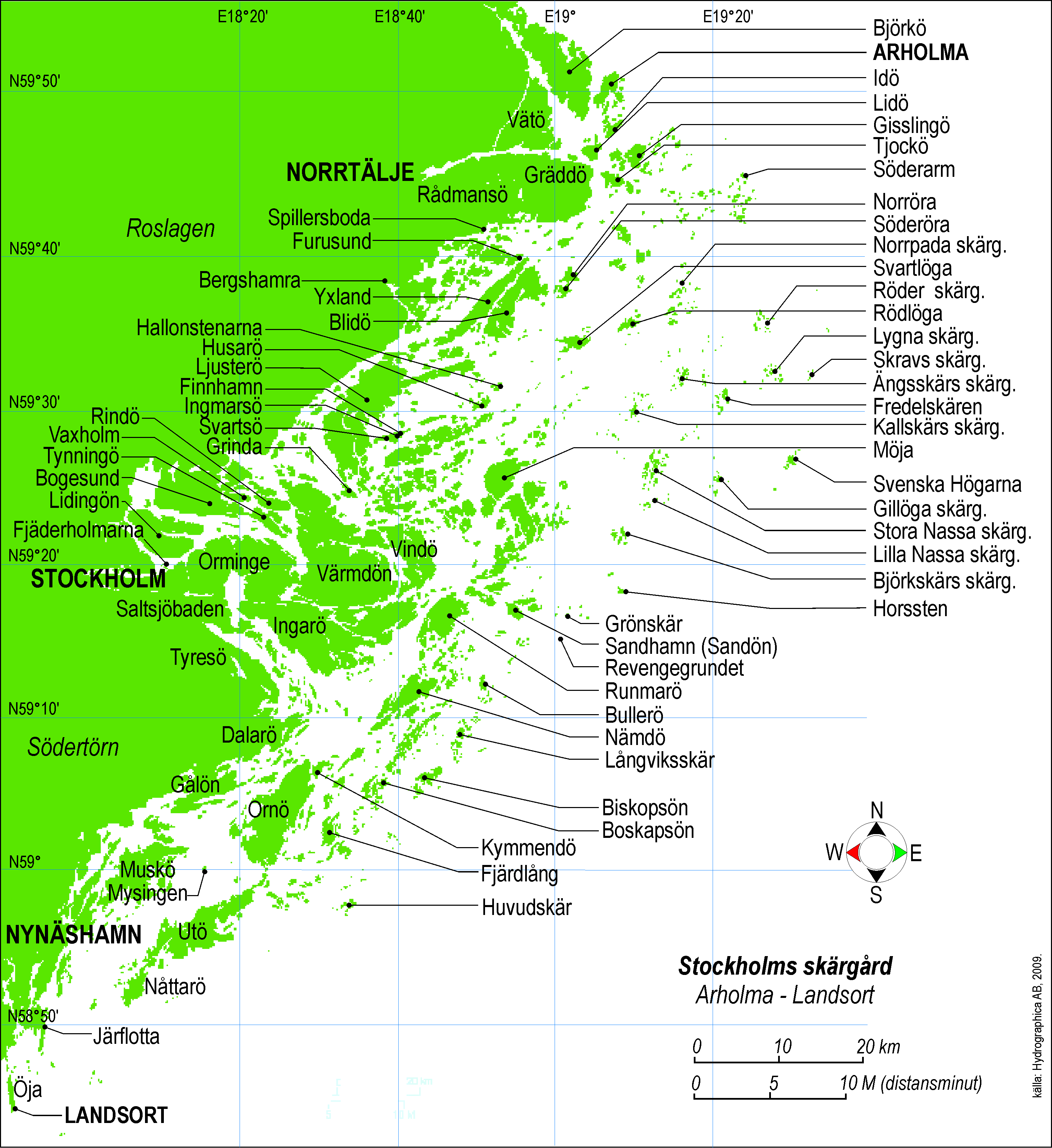
Map of Stockholm archipelago, with Utö in the southwest

The island of Rånö has a minimarket and a small restaurant with entertainment in the summer. There is also camping and cottage rental on Rånö.

On the island of Ålö - connected to Utö via a bridge - there is a popular restaurant with entertainment during the summer. The Båtshaket restaurant serve various fish dishes: cured and smoked salmon, eel and other seafood.

== See also ==
- Stockholm Archipelago Trail
