= Conscription in Sweden =

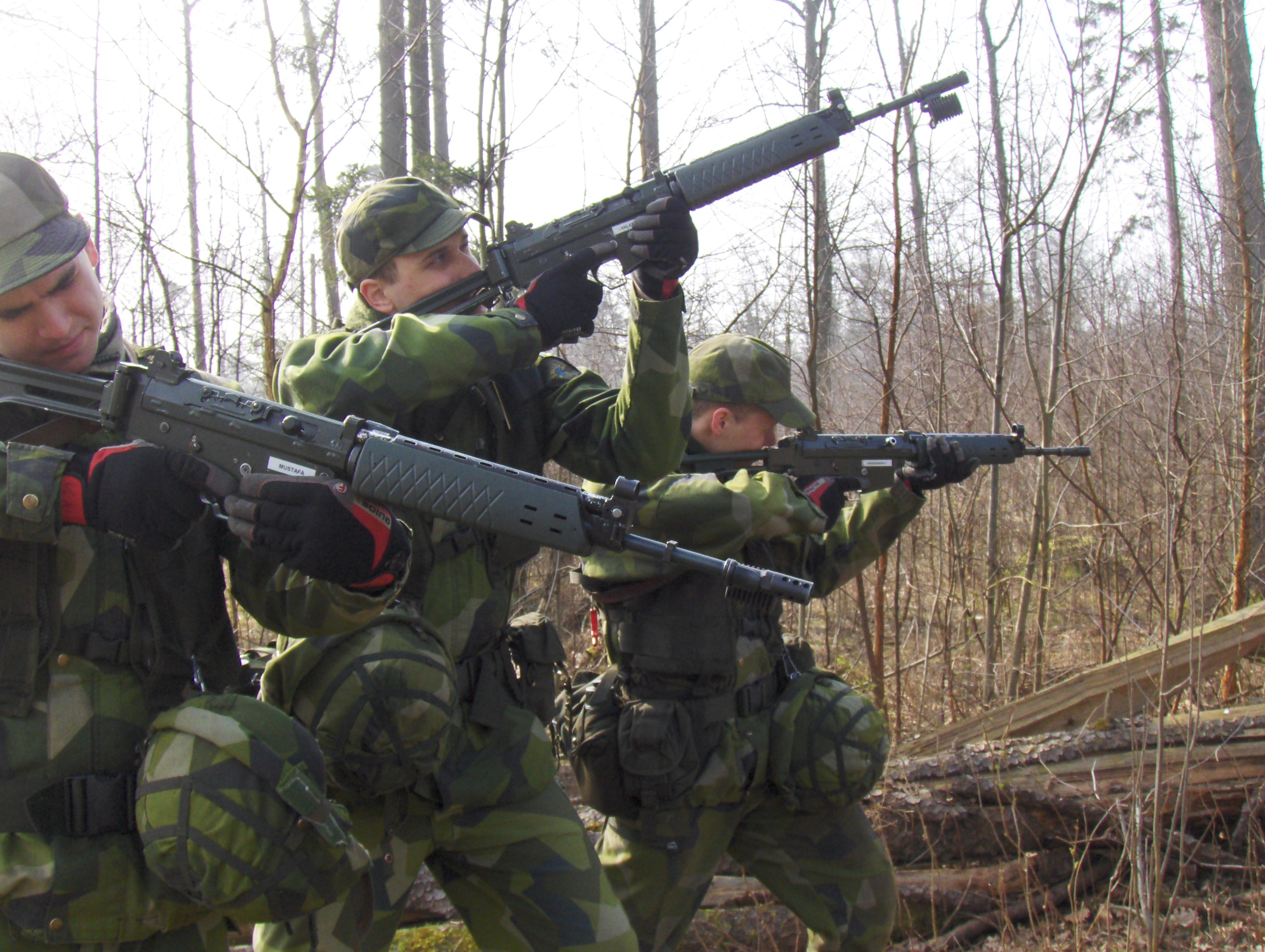
Swedish conscripts in 2008.

Sweden has had partial conscription for both men and women since 2017. After completing training, conscripts are placed in the reserve and assigned positions in the table of organization and equipment of a reserve unit.

== History ==
Between the 17th century and 1900, Sweden had an allotment system. Mandatory military service for men was introduced in 1901. During the height of the Cold War, about 85% of Swedish men were conscripted. In 2010, the male-only system was replaced with a gender-neutral conscription system; at the same time conscription was paused.

Mandatory conscription was re-activated by the then Social democratic government in 2017, which cited increased threats to national security. The Swedish Armed Forces planned to call 4,000 recruits annually for basic military training in 2018 and 2019. As the relevant age cohort was about 100,000, this meant that roughly 4% were to be enlisted.

Beginning in 2018, over 4,000 conscripts were indeed called up. 85% of those called up were men; the percentage of female conscripts was gradually increased over the following years, reaching 20% in 2022 and 24% in 2023. The conscripts were chosen from a pool of approximately 13,000 young people born in 1999 to serve for 12 months.

In early 2019, after fines had been received by dozens of young people for draft evasion, the first jail sentences since the return of conscription were handed out to those refusing to carry out their military service.

== Non-military service ==
Conscientious objectors in Sweden have the right to choose alternative service. After completing alternative service, the conscript then belongs to the civilian reserve.

== Conscript officers ==
From 1983 to 2010, some conscripts had their service period extended to 450 days to allow for company command training. During the extended training, they held the rank of sergeants. After training, they were placed in the reserve as second lieutenants and assigned as platoon leaders or quartermasters in the TOE. Such "conscript officers" could not be promoted further unless they completed regular officer training at a military academy.
