= European Union Military Operation in Chad and the Central African Republic =

- Active: February 2008 – 15 March 2009
- Allegiance: European Union, with United Nations mandate
- Size: 4,300 troops (3,700 operational, 600 reserve)
- Part of: United Nations Mission in the Central African Republic and Chad
- Operational HQ: Fort Mont-Valérien, Paris, France
- Nickname(s): EUFOR Tchad/RCA; European Union Force Chad/CAR

Commanders
- Current commander: Lieutenant General Patrick Nash

European Union Force Chad and the Central African Republic (EUFOR Chad and the Central African Republic), also EUFOR Tchad/RCA after the French, was the European Union mission in Chad and the Central African Republic (CAR), authorised in late 2007. EUFOR Chad/CAR was authorised under the same United Nations Security Council resolution that mandated MINURCAT, a UN force tasked with training police and improving judicial infrastructure.

The European Union Force's mandate included "to take all necessary measures, within its capabilities and its area of operation in eastern Chad and the north-eastern Central African Republic" to protect civilians, facilitate delivery of humanitarian aid and ensure the safety of UN personnel. The military operation was approved by the Council of the European Union on 15 October 2007. The EU operation commander was Lieutenant General Patrick Nash of the Irish Defence Forces. The force was announced to be 4,300 troops strong. Out of these, 3,700 troops were deployed in the area of operations, and a strategic reserve of 600 troops was stationed in Europe.

The mission started to deploy in February 2008, reaching its Initial Operational Capability on 15 March 2008. On 15 March 2009, a UN force took over under the MINURCAT mandate.

== Contributors ==
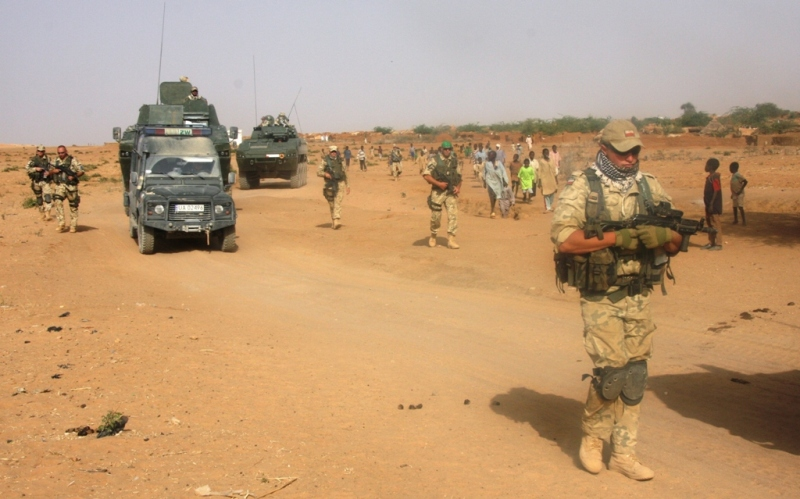
Polish troops from the EUFOR contingent on patrol in Chad

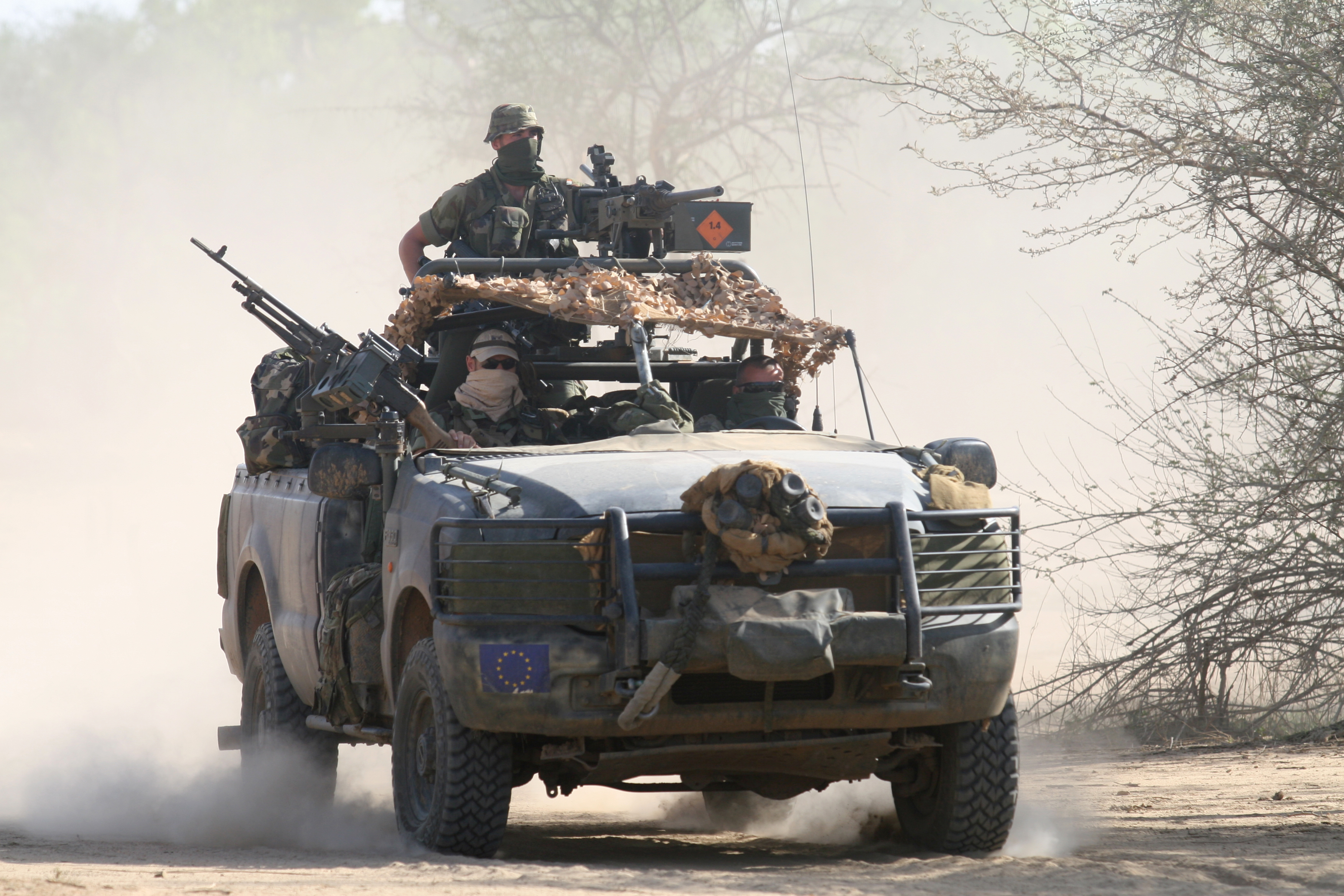
Ireland's ARW on a special reconnaissance patrol in Chad (2008)

The operation headquarters was located in Mont Valérien, France, in a completely dedicated structure. The Force Headquarters was in N'Djamena and Abéché with forward bases in Goz Beïda (South), Farchana (Centre), Iriba (North) and a smaller one in Birao (CAR) (See map). The multinational EU force commander was Irish Lieutenant General Patrick Nash. At its full operational capability, the force was 3,700 strong. France, the largest component of the EUFOR Tchad/RCA, provided a battalion of 2,000 soldiers and 500 support units. Other large contingents were the Irish and Polish – 450 and 400 strong, respectively. In addition to 14 European Union member states in the field, 19 in theatre and 22 at the operation headquarters (23 in total), three third countries took part in the mission: Albania, Croatia, and Russia.

Neither Germany nor the United Kingdom deployed any troops on the ground, highlighting limited consensus on the mission among the big three member states despite the unanimous adoption and implementation of the Joint Action by the Council of the European Union. Denmark does not participate on the Common Security and Defence Policy and therefore did not take part in planning, financing and implementation of this mission.

Contributors include (with number of troops committed):

- Albania – 60 troops
- Austria – 160 troops, 50 special forces of the Jagdkommando
- Belgium – 100 troops, 22 special forces of the Special Forces Group, one C-130 transport aircraft + airforce personnel
- Bulgaria – Two officers
- Croatia – 15 special forces (Special Operations Battalion)
- Estonia – 55 troops
- Finland – 60 troops
- France – 2,000 troops, eight helicopters, 500 soldiers providing logistical support
- Germany – Four
- Greece – Four
- (Republic of Ireland) Ireland – 450 troops, including 50 Army Ranger Wing (special forces) operatives.
- Italy – 100 troops (Medical Role 2)
- Netherlands – 60 Marines
- Poland – 400 troops 16 KTO Rosomak APCs, three Mi-17 helicopters and one C-295 transport aircraft.
- Portugal – One C-130H with 30 Air Force personnel
- Romania – 120 troops
- Slovenia – 15 special forces (ESD) including one in EUFOR HQ in France
- Spain – Two Tactical Transport Aircraft (CASA 295) with 100 troops
- Sweden – 202 Swedish Marines and a small group from the Särskilda skyddsgruppen (SSG)
- United Kingdom – Four

== Deployment ==
The mission dealt with logistical difficulties from the beginning. Originally scheduled to be launched in November 2007, the mission was delayed by the lack of equipment and money and the preparations continued only after the French promised another 500 support units and 10 helicopters. Chad and the CAR are landlocked countries and the area of operation was on their eastern border (some 2,400 kilometres from the Atlantic coastline, of which only 900 km (560 mi) could be crossed by rail). This required the use of harbours and territory of Cameroon and airlifting the rest to N'Djamena as the Abéché airport in the theatre was not considered safe. Major technical support, especially the transportation of daily needs of the troops (such as food and water), were provided by the permanent French mission to Chad. Deployment was not made any easier by limited infrastructure, the vastness of the area of operations, the inability of the government of Chad to provide basic supplies for the mission and the severe climate.

The logistical problems were highlighted by the fact that full operational capability (FOC) could not be declared until 15 September 2008, a full six months after the declaration of the initial operational capability and halfway through the mission. It was originally expected to be achieved by May. The mission also continued to struggle over airlift capabilities, partially settling the matter only in December with the deployment of Russian helicopters.

Apart from the logistical challenges, the mission also faced problems of its impartiality and distinction from other troops and staff on the ground, especially in Chad. There was a concern about sufficiently differentiating the regular French soldiers who serve in Chad under the bilateral defence agreement between the two countries, the MINURCAT personnel and the EUFOR troops (the majority of whom were also French). Also, explaining the different roles of those forces to the local population and briefing of the troops on the complexities of the region was a major task. Rebel groups even threatened to attack any foreign force which they do not see as neutral, a threat clearly directed against France's dual role in Chad. This reiterated fears that the mission might be seen as a protection of the N'djamena regime. But the president of Chad, Idriss Déby, also accused EUFOR of collaboration with the rebels after the brief outbreak of violence around Goz Beida in June 2008. The accusation arose mostly from the narrowness of the mandate – criticised by both humanitarian workers and the Chadian government – which was not designed to interfere in the internal affairs of Chad (or to significantly improve security and development in the area). Paradoxically, Déby's critique after the June incidents strengthened the perceived neutrality of the mission.

== Sudan incident ==
On 4 March 2008, two French soldiers in a soft-skinned Land Rover-type vehicle strayed 3 km into Sudan from Chad, and were fired upon by Sudanese forces. One of the soldiers was killed and reported missing while the other was wounded. Twelve French soldiers then entered Sudan to search for the missing soldier. They then came under fire, and fired back, killing one Sudanese soldier. The missing soldier's body was found by the Sudanese Army on 5 March, and was taken to Khartoum to be turned over to the French. However, one of the soldiers' grenades detonated as his body was being carried away, killing four Sudanese workers.

== Costs ==
The operation came slightly under budget at €119.6 million (comparing to the planned €120 million, but originally envisioned at €99.2 million). This, however, was only for the common costs of the operation (mostly construction and operation of the camps), financed through the EU mechanism for financing military operations (Athena). The real costs are estimated to be between €400 and €500 million.

In addition to these common costs of the EU member states associated with the mission, the EU donated €10 million to MINURCAT to finance its programme to train, equip and support the deployment of Chadian police. The 10th European Development Fund also allocated almost €300 million and €137 million to Chad and the CAR, respectively, for the period 2008–2013.

== See also ==
- European Union Force
- CSDP missions, list of all interventions conducted by/through the EU.
- War in Chad (2005–2010)
