= Valdemar Atterdag's invasion of Gotland =

1361 Danish victory over the Hanseatic League

- Part of the Danish-Hanseatic War (1361–1370)
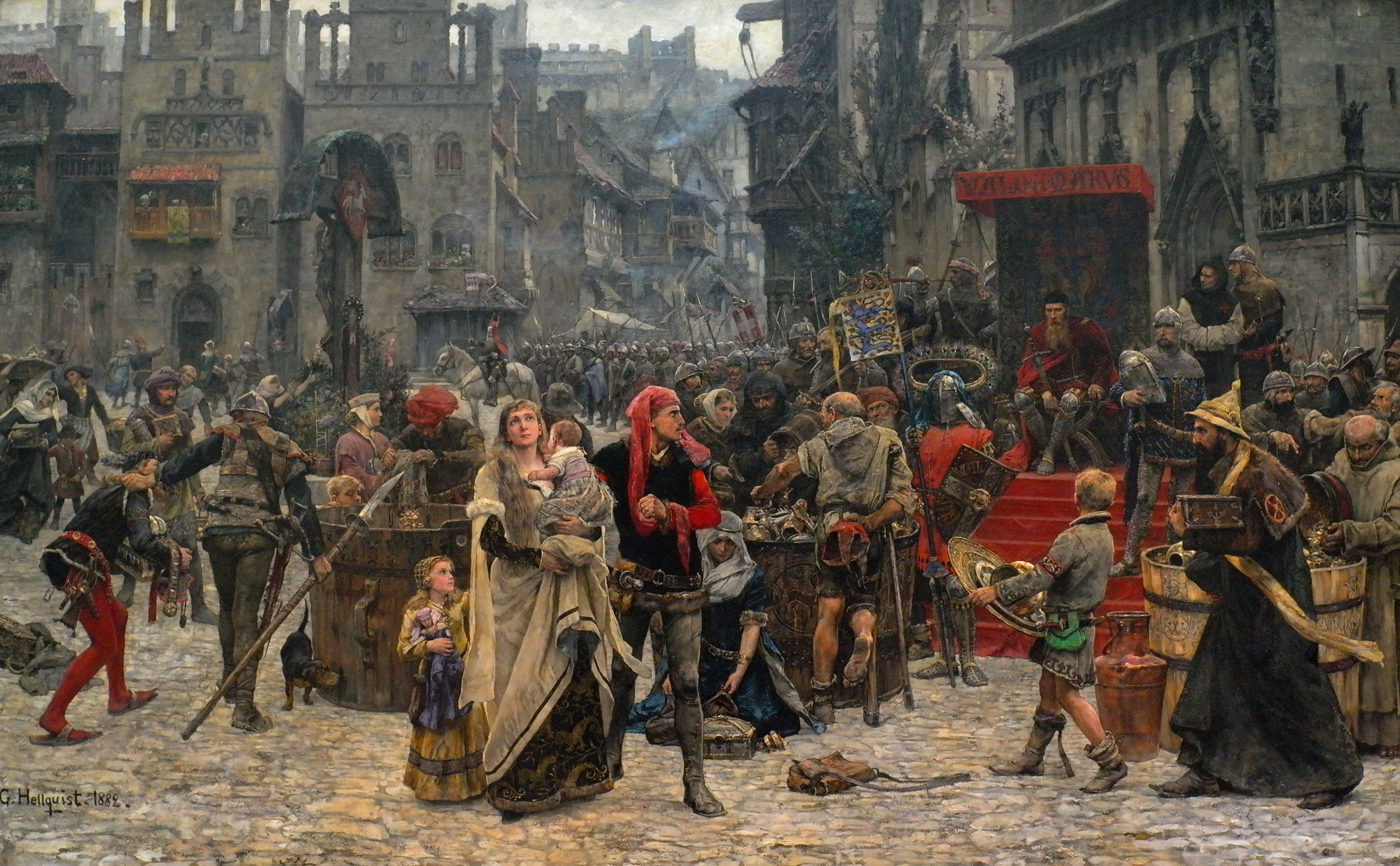
- Valdemar Atterdag holding Visby to ransom, 1361, by Carl Gustaf Hellqvist in 1882
Date	22 – 27 July 1361
Location	Gotland (present-day Sweden)
Result	Danish victory
Territorial changes	Gotland annexed by Denmark

Belligerents
Denmark	(History of Sweden (800–1521)) Sweden; Gutes

Commanders and leaders
(Medieval Denmark) Valdemar Atterdag (Medieval Denmark) Christopher of Lolland (Medieval Denmark) Eric of Lauenburg	Unknown

Strength
2,000–2,500 men	c. 5,000 men

Casualties and losses
300 dead	3,000 dead

Valdemar Atterdag's invasion of Gotland took place in July 1361.

The troops of the Danish King Valdemar Atterdag won several battles on Gotland against Gutnish troops, the last outside Visby on 27 July. The inhabitants of Visby surrendered and opened the city gates to the victor, after which the so-called fire assessment of Visby took place, an event surrounded by several myths. The king issued letters of privilege for Visby which confirmed the city's former privileges.

In retrospect, it is difficult to separate fiction from the truth of what happened, as there are very few contemporary sources. That Valdemar Atterdag was on Gotland and fought against the farmers is certain, and also that the battle outside Visby was one of the bloodiest in the History of Scandinavia, but claims about the fire estimate are difficult to confirm. A series of myths and legends have survived to our days. On May 1, 1361, the Swedish king Magnus Eriksson sent out a letter in which he warned the citizens of Visby about an impending attack. Valdemar's attack on Gotland seemed expected.

The remains of those who fell in the battle outside were thrown into mass graves, often with their armor on, which has meant that many of these have been preserved. The most famous mass grave is at the Battle of Visby.

== Background ==
After the Black Death subsided, Danish King Valdemar Atterdag intended to let the rich merchants of the Hanseatic League pay for a renewal of their trade privileges. The first among them was Visby.

The letter of privilege that Valdemar issued for Visby on July 29, 1361, two days after the battle of the ring wall, assured the city "all the rights and freedoms it has had since ancient times". In a letter from Visby to other Hanseatic cities in 1362, Hansa's estate in the city is said to have been saved by paying for it, which could mean that some kind of taxation was demanded. Valdemar's attack on Visby led to conflict between Denmark and the Hanseatic League, who saw Visby as their city.

== Landing on Gotland ==
King Valdemar sailed with his fleet towards Öland first. After taking the defense tower in Borgholm, the fleet continued to Gotland. On July 22, a fleet consisting of, among other things, koggar was sighted at Stora Karlsö. The squadron comprised thirty ships. The landing took place later in the day, possibly in Vivesholm at Klintehamn, alternatively at Kronvald's fishing location on Ekstakusten on the west side of the island. According to contemporary accounts, the hastily assembled rural population put up counter-defenses and fought several fierce battles against Valdemar's 1,800 jackals, of whom conscripted German soldiers made up the bulk. These were professional warriors in modern armor. The Gotland militia, divided into six combat divisions, so-called settings, were repulsed on 24 July at the Fjäle myr.

== Battle of Visby ==
The last of three major clashes took place outside the ring wall. On July 26, Valdemar's troops marched to Visby, reaching it before the Gotland militia. On July 27, Valdemar's troops first attacked the Gotlanders with crossbows. This is believed to have knocked out a fifth of the Gutland militia. Then the melee took place in which the peasant army was easily defeated. During the battle, the city gates were kept locked. A Lübsk chronicle tells more generally of a bloody defeat because the peasants were unarmed and unaccustomed to battle. According to a Visby record, 1,800 Gotlanders were in the battle. On the Danish side, 300 soldiers lost their lives. They were buried in five or six mass graves near Solberga Nunnery's cemetery, at Söderport. The fallen were buried wearing their armor while swords and battle axes were kept. During excavations, well-preserved chain mail has been found together with other military equipment from that time. Some time after the battle, a memorial cross was erected at the Battle of Visby next to Solberga nunnery east of the ring wall. The cross's Latin inscription reads in Swedish translation "In the year of the Lord 1361, on July 27, in front of Visby gates, in the hands of the Danes, the boys buried here fell. Pray for them."

== Capitulation ==
Two days after the fighting, the council in Visby capitulated. The city gates were then opened for the Danes. The citizens of Visby probably did not take part in the battle outside the city, but had a different attitude to the attacking force than the countryside, opting for negotiations when the battle was over, to avoid a siege and a devastating storm. They also had better opportunities to negotiate within protective walls than the population had in the open countryside. The city recognized Valdemar as the new ruler of Visby and Gotland and the Danish king responded by confirming Visby's city privileges, including the right to mint its own coins. Visby's citizens retained control over the city's administration, taxation, and administration of justice.

== Fire taxation ==
Visby was not looted. Instead, the city was taxed as payment for the settlement. According to the legend, the king is said to have set out three barrels in Visby Square and demanded that the people of Visby should have filled the containers with gold, silver and other valuables within three "sunmarks". According to a chronicle, one of Valdemar's ships was wrecked at the Karlsöarna with precious goods, taken from churches, monasteries, and citizens, during the journey back to Denmark.

== Consequences ==
The incident was a difficult setback for Visby. Even earlier, however, the city's power had begun to decline. The city had gained competitors in the powerful merchants of the northern German cities, especially from Lübeck, who sailed past Gotland and directly to Russia.

At the same time, Valdemar had not with impunity set fire to a member of the Hansan, which at that time had reached its peak in power and influence. 77 Hanseatic cities, from the Netherlands to the Livland coast, formed an attacking confederation and received the support of some German princes. In this situation, Valdemar was powerless, as the Hanseatics controlled the sea, and peace was brought dearly.

== Sources ==
- Andersson, Ingvar (1950). "Visbys dagtingan". Sveriges historia (3. uppl. ed.). Stockholm: Natur och kultur. pp. 92–96. LIBRIS: 1498697.
- Thordeman, Bengt; Nörlund, Poul; Ingelmark, Bo E. (2001). Armour from the Battle of Wisby, 1361. Union City, Calif.: Chivalry Bookshelf. ISBN 1-891448-05-6.
- Westholm, Gun (2007). Visby 1361: invasionen [Visby 1361: The Invasion] (in Swedish). Stockholm: Prisma. ISBN 978-91-518-4568-5.
