= Battle of Visby =

1361 battle in what is now Sweden

Coordinates: 57°38′N 18°17′E

- Part of the Danish-Hanseatic War (1361–1370) and Valdemar Atterdag's invasion of Gotland
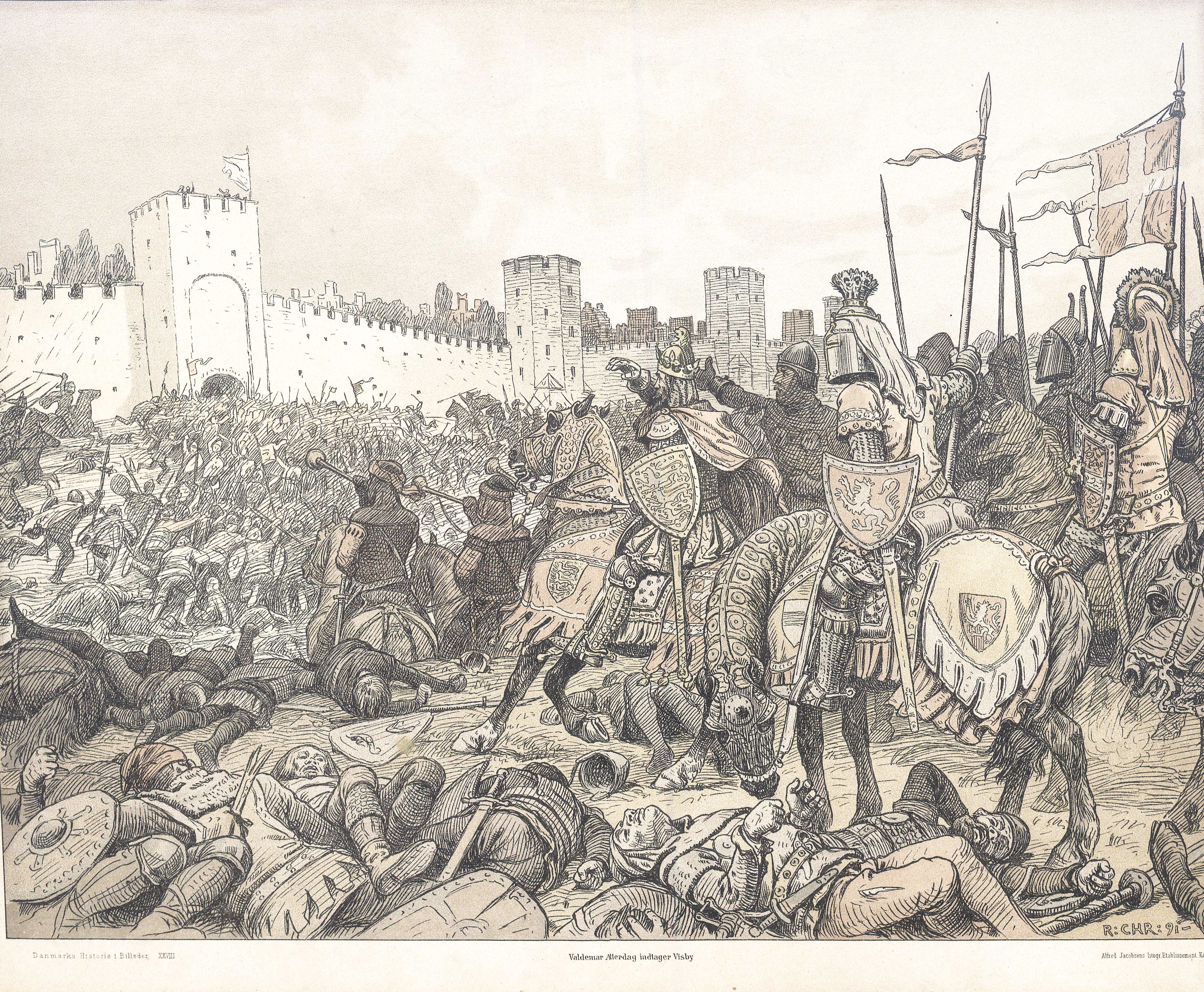
- Valdemar IV captures Visby, by Rasmus Christiansen
Date	27 July 1361
Location	Visby, Gotland, Sweden
Result	Danish victory

Belligerents
Denmark	Sweden; Gotland

Commanders and leaders
(Medieval Denmark) Valdemar IV	Unknown

Strength
2,000–2,500 men. Mostly knights on horse and German mercenaries on foot	2,000 men. Mostly poorly armed farmers from rural Gotland

Casualties and losses
300	~1,700

The Battle of Visby was fought in 1361 near the town of Visby on the island of Gotland, Sweden, between the forces of the Danish king and the Gutnish country yeomen. The Danish force was victorious.

== Background ==
The Gutes of Gotland paid taxes to and was a semi-independent part of Sweden under King Magnus IV of Sweden, though the population of Visby was diverse and included people of Ruthenian descent, Danes, and Germans. In 1280 the city of Visby had joined the Hanseatic League along with Riga, Lübeck, Tallinn, and other large population centers from northern Europe, further separating Visby from the Gutnish countryside. Antagonism between the city dwellers and the Gutnish country yeomen heightened; the latter were defeated in battle in 1288, despite the aid of knights from Estonia. On 22 July 1361, King Valdemar IV of Denmark (Valdemar Atterdag) sent an army ashore on Gotland's west coast. The Danish king wished to establish firm control on the Gutelandian trade routes.

== Forces ==
The Danish force was led by Valdemar IV of Denmark, and composed of Danish and German soldiers, many of them mercenaries from the Baltic coast of Germany, with recent experience in the various feuds and wars between the German and Scandinavian states. These men would have worn what was known as transitional armour, with iron or steel plates over vital areas and joints over a full suit of chain mail.

The Gutes were commanded by an unknown leader, probably a minor noble with military experience, and the force composed mainly of other minor nobles, their retinues, and freemen. The ordinary freemen appear to have worn limited but still effective protection, with many excavated skeletons found wearing a chain-mail shirt or a coat of plates to protect the torso. Others may have worn padded gambesons, though these would not have survived decomposition in the ground after the battle. Unusually, many of the Gutes appear to have had minimal head protection, with many wearing only a mail coif; however any helmets may have been stripped from the bodies after the battle. Very few weapons have been discovered, but it is likely that both sides used round and heater-type shields, spears, axes, billhooks, pikes, and poleaxes. For close combat, both sides would have had swords, light axes, war hammers, and maces.

== Battle ==
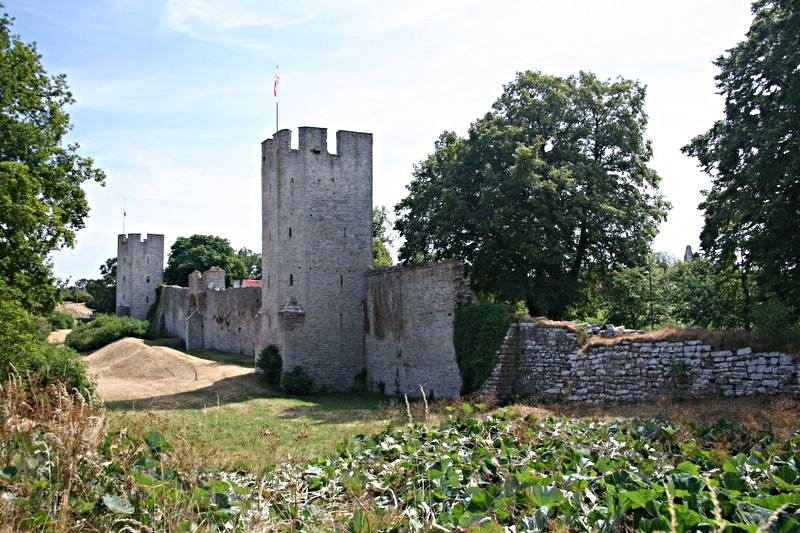
Picture of the Visby city wall, near the north gate. The main battle was fought within 300 metres of the city's fortifications.

The Danish troops moved toward Visby. On the first day of the invasion, two minor skirmishes were fought on marshy ground between yeomen farmers and the army. About 1,500 Gotlandic farmers were killed after the battle of Mästerby.

On 27 July, a Gutnish yeomen army fought the Danes just outside the city walls and was severely beaten, with an estimated death toll of about 1,800 yeomen and peasants; the Danish casualties remain unknown. Only a couple of items that can be linked with Danish soldiers have been found, including a purse and ornamented armor belonging to a member of the Roorda Family from Friesland. Casualties can be compared with those that the French suffered at the Battle of Poitiers in 1356 and would be considered high by medieval standards.

== Aftermath ==
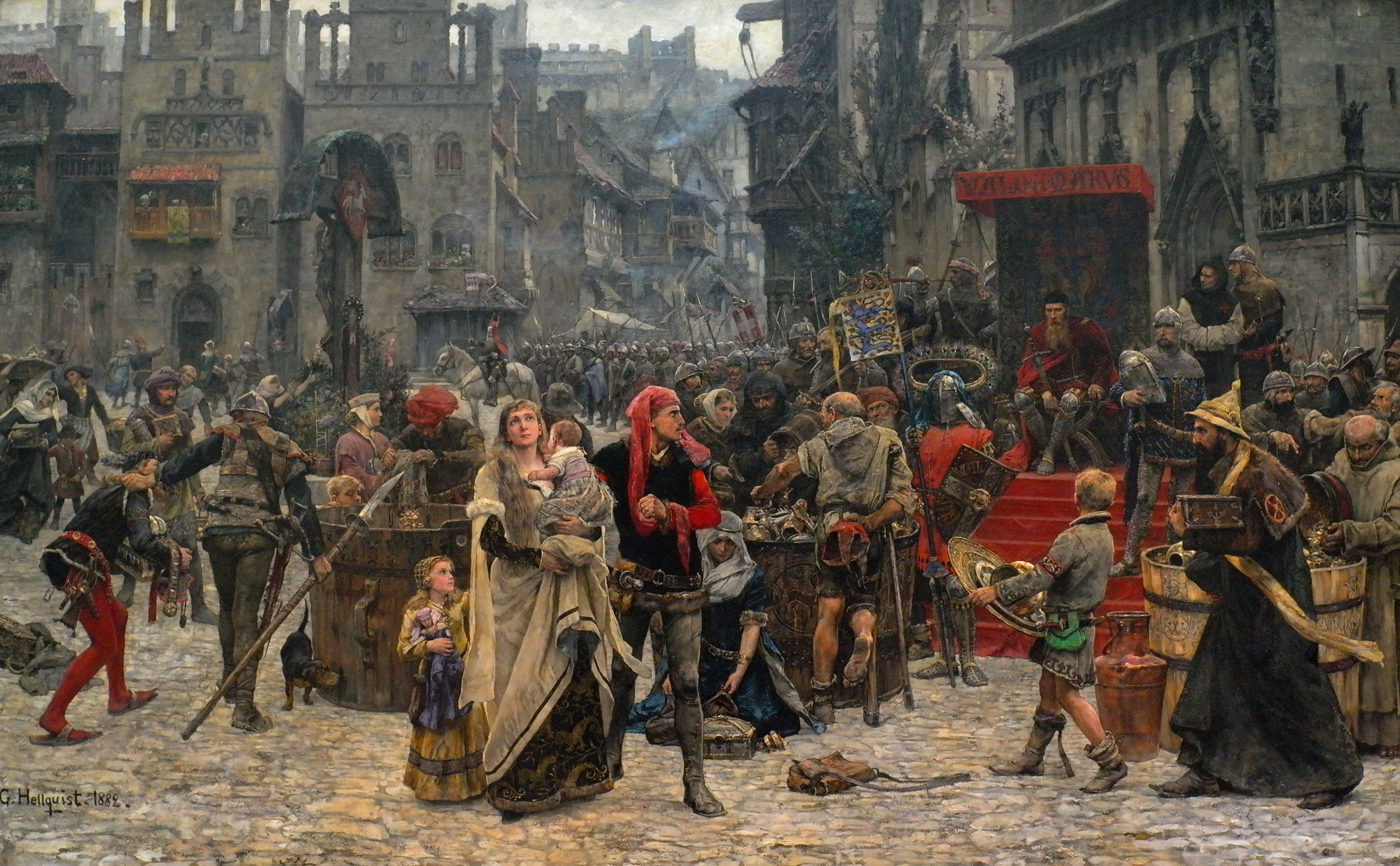
The Visby ransom as Carl Gustaf Hellqvist imagined it.

Following the devastating battle, the citizens of Visby decided to surrender to avoid further losses. To save the city from a sacking, the inhabitants paid a large amount of their wealth to King Valdemar. This extortion of contributions became a legendary event, although it cannot be confirmed to have taken place and, if so, the full details are still unclear. Despite the payment, the Danes still plundered several of the town's churches and monasteries.

King Valdemar appointed sheriffs to govern Visby and then set sail again. It would take another year before he officially added "King of Gotland" to his many titles. When Albert, King of Sweden, took the Swedish crown he claimed Gotland as part of his domains and held the island at least until 1369; thus, the Danish presence there couldn't have been strong, as it so rapidly and easily returned to the Swedish crown. The island would be disputed over by the House of Mecklenburg and the Danish crown until 1376, when Queen Margaret (the daughter of the late King Valdemar) officially claimed the island for Denmark.

In 1389 King Albert was defeated in a civil war, in which Queen Margaret supported the "rebels", and he was forced to abdicate. However, he was granted Gotland and its "capital" Visby, where he remained with a "pirate" organization called the Victual Brothers. It was not until 1408 that the last remains of the house of Mecklenburg and the above-mentioned pirates were driven out for good.

== Archaeological excavation ==
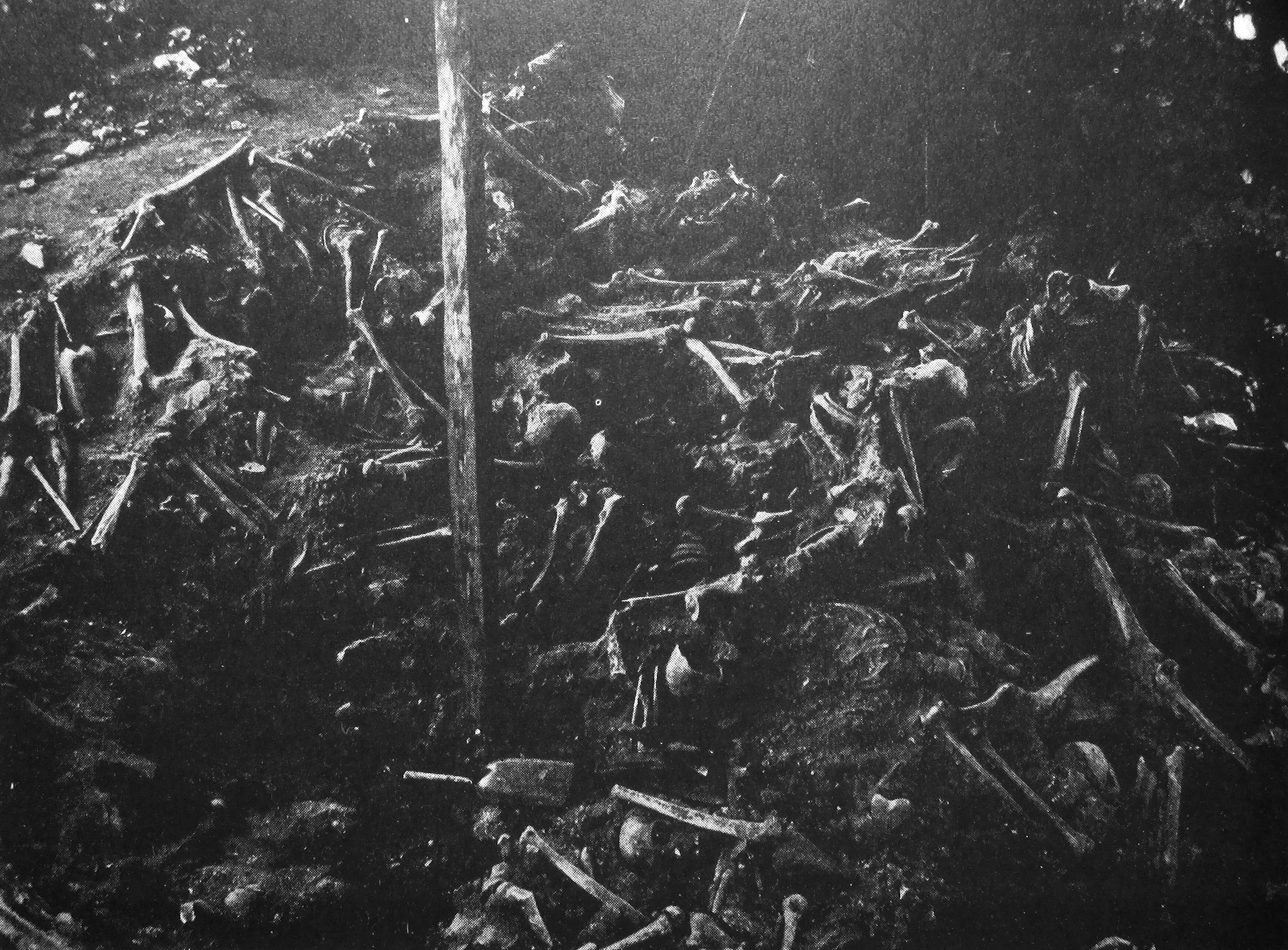
The mass grave at Korsbetningen during the 1905 excavation.

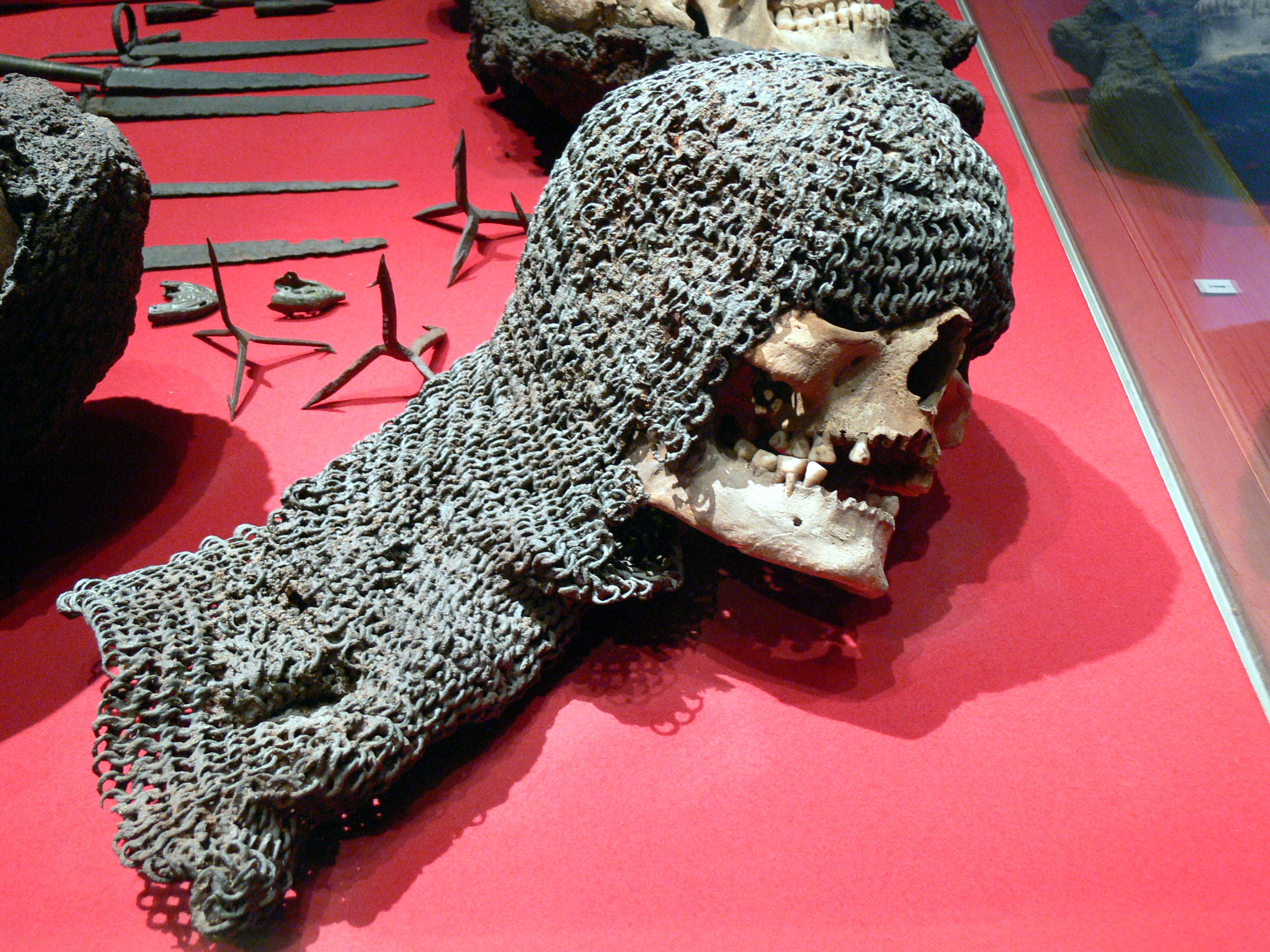
The skull of a soldier who participated in the 1361 campaign.

The first archeological excavations were done in 1905, led by Oscar Wilhelm Wennersten and master builder Nils Pettersson at the place now known as Korsbetningen in Visby, where the first mass grave from the battle was found. The excavation also revealed the location of the Solberga Abbey. It showed that at least a third of the Gotlandic army consisted of minors and elderly. Many of the dead defenders were, unusually, buried in their armour; according to historian John Keegan "...hot weather and their great number (about 2,000 bodies were disinterred six hundred years later) defeated the efforts of the victors to strip them before decomposition began". The site of the excavation "yielded one of the most fearsome revelations of a medieval battle known to archaeologists".

Five mass graves were located outside the city's walls.

== Medieval Week in Gotland ==
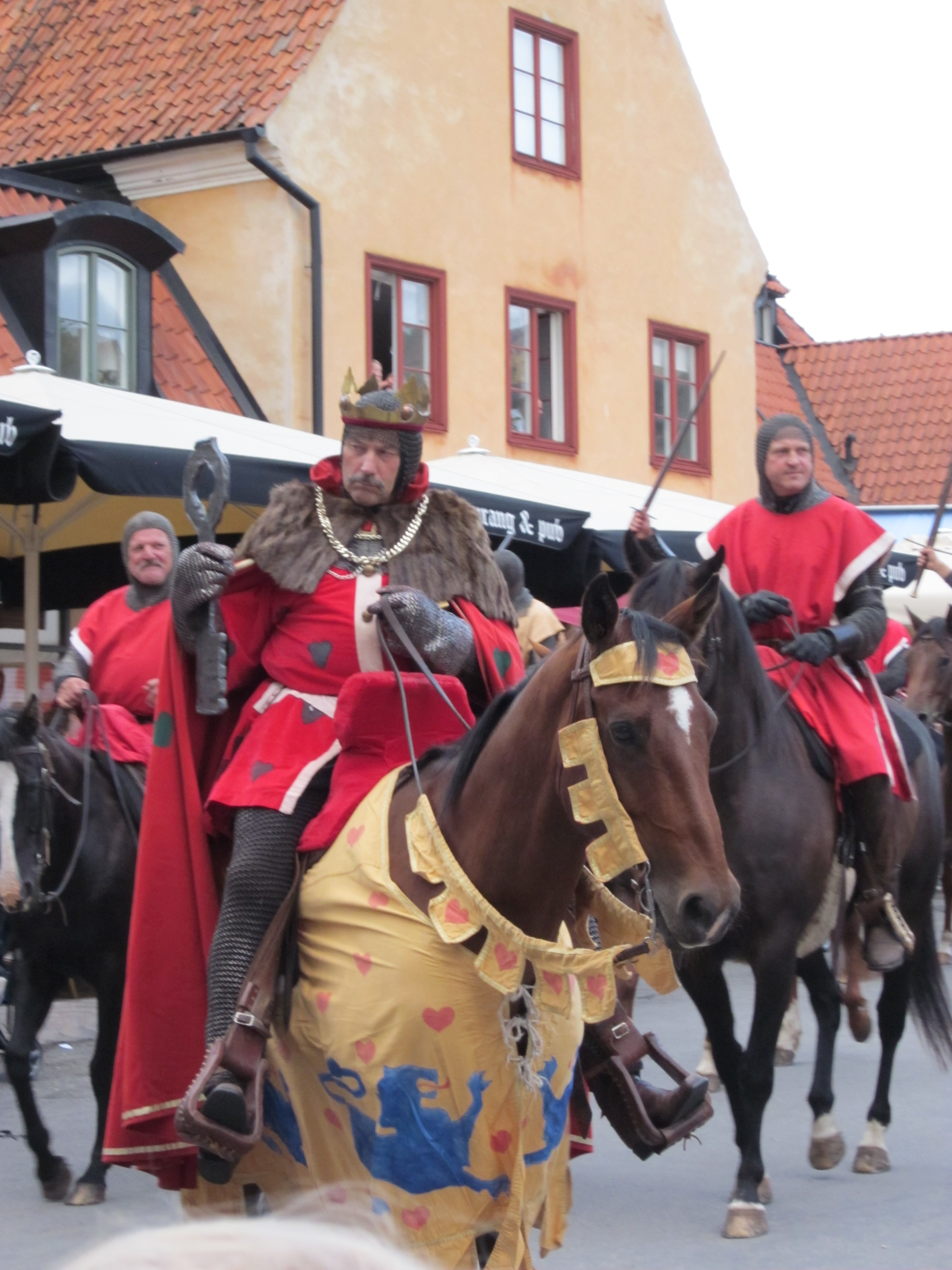
Reenactment of King Valdemar's entrance into Visby

Every year, during the Medieval Week in Gotland, a historical reenactment of King Valdemar IV of Denmark's entrance and ransoming of Visby is staged at the historical site. Since 2011, the Battle of Visby itself is reenacted outside the Visby city wall with participants from historical societies from several European countries and the United States.

== See also ==
- List of church ruins on Gotland
- Mästerby
- Military on Gotland
