= Military on Gotland =

Swedish military presence

The Gotlandsgruppen coat of arms

Gotland's location within Sweden

The presence of the military on Gotland results from the Swedish island's strategic military importance in the Baltic Sea for most of the nation's history. Gotland has been fortified in stages since the 13th century.

During the 20th century, infantry, artillery, air force and naval elements were stationed on Gotland as part of Sweden's defence system, until all permanent military units were stood down in 2005. With tensions in Northeastern Europe and Russia escalating in 2014–2015, the Swedish government has taken a new interest in remilitarizing the island. And in September 2016 regular troops were once again stationed on the island, albeit as an interim measure until a permanent garrison could be reestablished. As of 1 January 2018, Gotland has re-established the Gotland Regiment.

== History ==
Since the Iron Age, Gotland has occupied a strategic location in the Baltic Sea from both a trade and military perspective.

=== Periods of major fortification ===
The various known establishment of fortifications on Gotland can be roughly broken down into the following broad time periods:

- First known period: From around the late 4th century BC (sometime shortly before 200 BC) to the 10th century AD, which may consist of two or more overlapping periods.
- Second period: From the 12th century to the 15th century. A time of great discord and open warfare between various polities and interests. The era saw the end of Gotland as an independent kingdom. The fortified town of Visby was built and expanded during this time (founded around the 11th century).
- Third period: From the 16th century to the mid 17th century. An unsettled time in both politics and on the battlefield eventually led to the end of Gotland's time as an autonomous entity and it becoming an integral part of Sweden. In 1741 the renowned Swedish scientist Carl Linnaeus was sent to the island to assess its strategic and economic assets, in the light of serious fears that Russia might attempt an occupation.
- Fourth period: From the 1810s to around the 1880s. This period included an industrious time during the 1860s and 1870s when a number of well-designed, major artillery forts, like Fårösund Fortress and Enholmen Fortress, were constructed. These and other fortifications on Gotland would later serve to help ensure Sweden's neutrality in World War I. (Note: In an interim period between the Fourth and Fifth periods, spanning from the late 1910s to the late 1920s, airfields and other aviation related facilities were added to the fortifications. During this time the navy, joined later (and then quickly absorbed) by the then newly independent air force, constructed various permanent and semi-permanent facilities such as airfields and a seaplane station at Fårösund.)
- Fifth period: 1939 to 1989. A massive new round of major construction began as the world headed for a new world war, which continued right on into, and throughout the Cold War. From the late 1940s, most of the northern part of Gotland became an even more heavily fortified, military only zone, a status that was only rescinded in the early 1990s.

=== Cold War ===
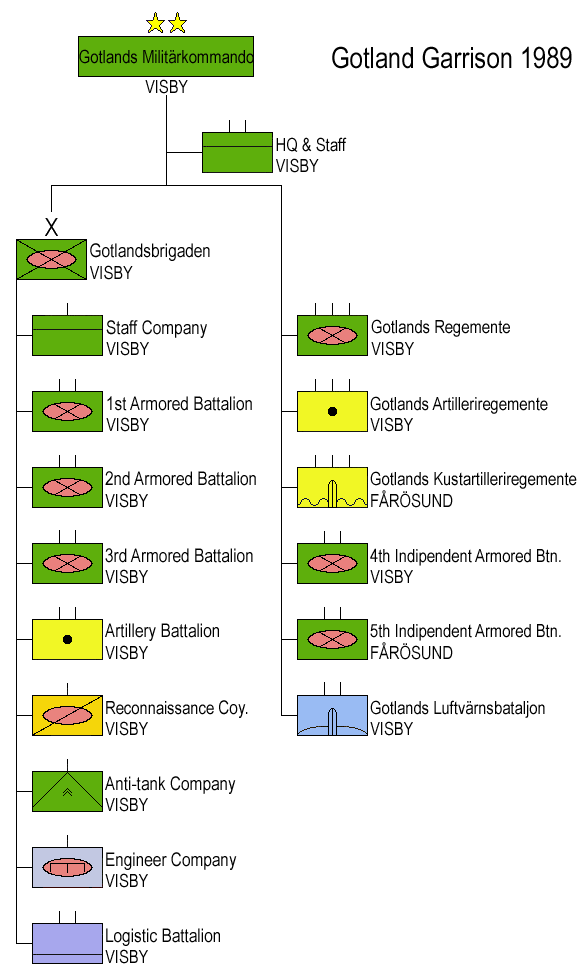
Swedish Army Gotland Garrison in 1989

In 1989 at the end of the Cold War the garrison of Gotland consisted of the following units:

- MKG - Gotland Military Command in Visby had operational control of the brigade and independent battalions in case of war.
  - Headquarters and Staff Battalion in Visby
  - PB 18 - Gotland Brigade in Visby:
    - Headquarters and staff company
    - 1st Armored Battalion with a staff company, 12 × Stridsvagn 102R tanks in one company, 28 × KP-car m/42 wheeled armoured personnel carriers and 24 × rifle squads with 8 × Pvpj 1110 90mm recoilless rifles in two companies, 4 × M/40 105 mm howitzers in an artillery battery and a logistic company
    - 2nd Armored Battalion with a staff company, 12 × Stridsvagn 102R tanks in one company, 28 × KP-car m/42 wheeled armoured personnel carriers and 24 × rifle squads with 8 × Pvpj 1110 90 mm recoilless rifles in two companies, 4 × M/40 105 mm howitzers in an artillery battery and a logistic company
    - 3rd Armored Battalion with a staff company, 12 × Stridsvagn 102R tanks in one company, 28 × KP-car m/42 wheeled armoured personnel carriers and 24 × rifle squads with 8 × Pvpj 1110 90 mm recoilless rifles in two companies, 4 × M/40 105 mm howitzers in an artillery battery and a logistic company
    - Artillery Battalion with 12 × 155mm Haubits m/F towed howitzers in three batteries
    - 18th Armored Reconnaissance Company with 6 × KP-car m/42 wheeled armoured personnel carriers, 12 × Jeeps, 12 × Recon Teams, 2 × rifle squads and 4 × Pvpj 1110 90 mm recoilless rifles
    - 18th Anti-tank Company with m/48 recoilless rifles and Bantam anti-tank missiles
    - 18th Engineer Company
    - Logistic Battalion
  - P 18 - Gotland Regiment in Visby. Tasked with training all units of the Gotland Brigade and Gotland Military Command, except for artillery and air defence units.
  - A 7 - Gotland Artillery Regiment in Visby. Tasked with training field artillery units on Gotland.
  - KA 3 - Gotland Coastal Artillery Regiment in Fårösund trained and fielded a wide variety of units, which in case of war would have come under direct command of the Gotland Military Command: three mobile Coastal Guard Platoons (Sjöbevakningspluton) armed with light Robot 17 anti-ship missiles. One heavy anti-ship missile battery armed with Robot 08 missiles. The 7th Coastal Artillery Battery in Bunge with 3 × mobile 152mm M/37 cannons. Besides these mobile units the regiment also controlled the following fixed artillery positions: 4 × batteries of three 75 mm Tornpjäs m/57 automatic guns each at Kappelshamn, Ljugarn and St Olofsholm on Gotland and at Ryssnäs on Fårö, 1 × battery of three 120 mm Tornautomatpjäs m/70 automatic guns at Slite and 1 × battery of three twin-barreled 152 mm Kustartilleripjäs m/51 heavy coastal artillery guns at Bungenäs. Furthermore, the regiment trained a few smaller units, which maintained minefields with controlled mines along the coast of Gotland and Fårö. Additionally the regiment fielded a limited number of 75 mm m/65 automatic cannons, which were a mobile version of the 75mm Tornpjäs m/57 automatic guns and the small minelayer HSwMS Fårösund (16).
  - Lv 2 - Gotland Anti-Aircraft Battalion in Visby with Robot 69 and Robot 70 man-portable surface-to-air missiles, as well as 20mm lvakan m/40-70 and 40mm lvakan m/48 anti-aircraft autocannons.
  - 4th Independent Armored Battalion in Visby with a staff company, 12 × Stridsvagn 102R tanks in one company, 28 × KP-car m/42 wheeled armoured personnel carriers and 24 × rifle squads with 8 × Pvpj 1110 90 mm recoilless rifles in two companies, 4 × M/40 105 mm howitzers in an artillery battery and a logistic company
  - 5th Independent Armored Battalion in Fårösund with a staff company, 12 × Stridsvagn 102R tanks in one company, 28 × KP-car m/42 wheeled armoured personnel carriers and 24 × rifle squads with 8 × Pvpj 1110 90 mm recoilless rifles in two companies, 4 × M/40 105 mm howitzers in an artillery battery and a logistic company

=== 21st century ===
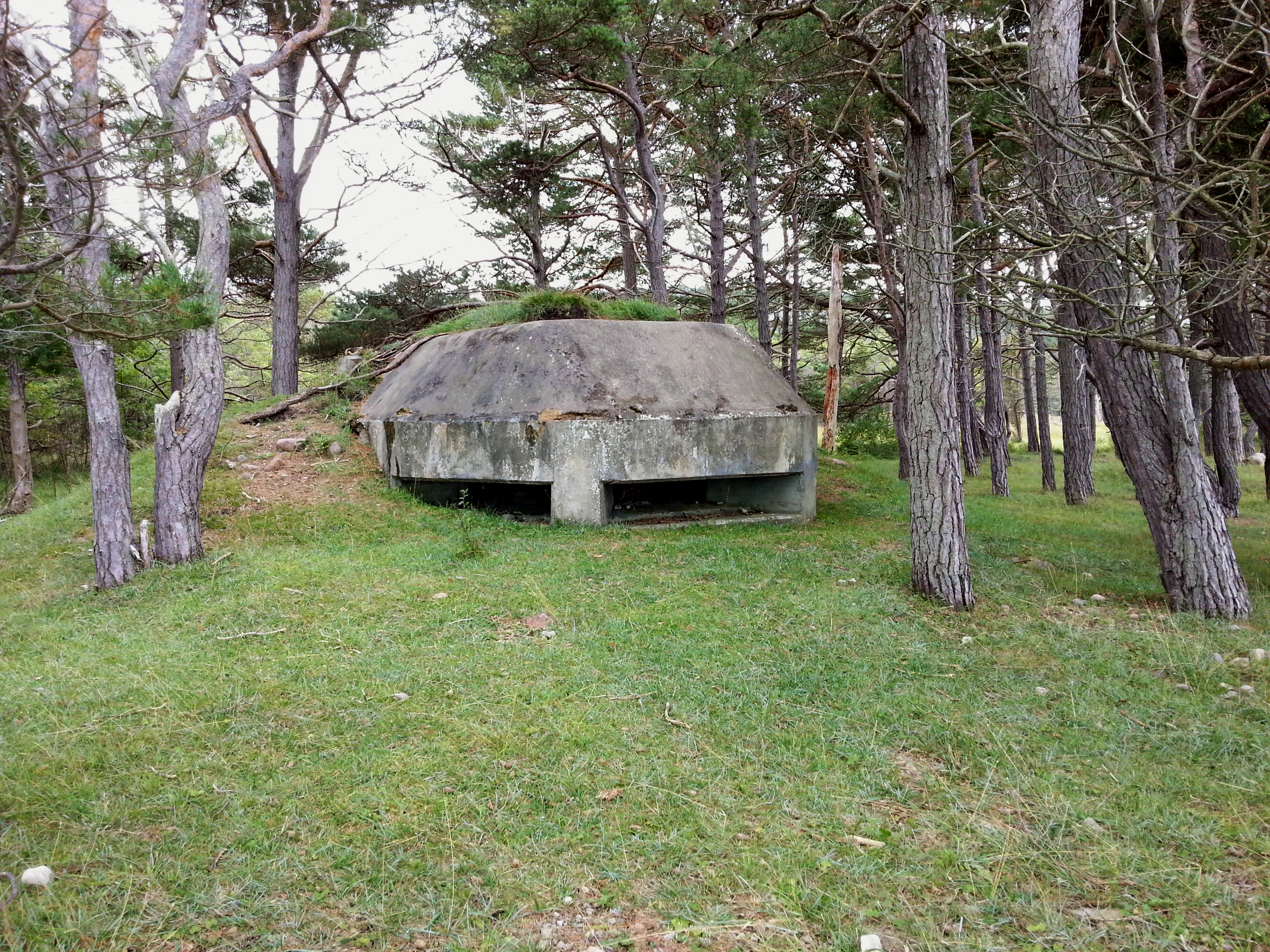
World War II era Kulsprutebunker (Machine gun bunker) located near Brucebo, Gotland County

Despite expectations at the end of the 20th century and the beginning of the 21st century bringing with it a new millennium, Gotland's strategic importance has continued. In a recognition of this, the Swedish government decided in March 2015 to begin reestablishing a permanent military presence on the island, starting with an initial 150 troop garrison, consisting primarily of elements from the Swedish Army. It has been reported that the bulk of this initial garrison will make up a new motorised rifle battalion, alternatively referred to in other reports as a "modular-structured rapid response Army battalion". As of March 2015, it is unclear whether the Gotland Regiment and the associated Gotland Brigade as well as the Gotland Artillery Regiment, key components of the previous garrison (disestablished in 2005), will also be reconstituted. Prior to the closure of the original garrison, there had been a continuous Swedish military presence on Gotland in one form or another, for nearly 200 years.

After the standing down of the original garrison, a battalion of the Swedish Home Guard is based on Gotland for emergencies as part of the Eastern Military Region (MR E). The unit, 32:a Gotlandsbataljonen (the 32nd Gotland battalion, also known as the Gotlandshemvärns bataljonen) acts as a training/reserve element of the regular 1st Marine Regiment (Amf 1) based at Muskö island, itself part of the Swedish Amphibious Corps. Among the residual war reserve stocks reported to be still in storage on Gotland in March 2015, were 14 tanks (Stridsvagn 122s) at the Tofta firing range (the Tofta skjutfält), but without any crews or dedicated maintenance personnel assigned to them.

Between 2005 and 2019, Gotland had no local air defence capability. Tentative plans to deploy the RBS 23 BAMSE short range air defence system on Gotland were scrapped with the shutdown of the garrison in 2005, and the air force has not generally operated interceptors or other tactical aircraft from the island since the early 1990s. However on 1 July 2019, it was announced that the Luftvärnssystem (Air Defence System) 23 would be deployed to the island of Gotland.

Despite its importance as a naval base in the past, as of 2004, there are no naval units based out of Gotland. Since 2000, there have been no coastal artillery units or facilities operational on Gotland.

Following the 2022 Russian invasion of Ukraine and Sweden's accession to NATO, military readiness on Gotland increased, with the Swedish government spending 150 million euros to expand military infrastructure on the island.

== Gotland Garrison ==
The original Gotland garrison, also known as the Visby Garrison, could trace its roots back to at least 1811. That was the year the Gotland National Conscription was formed to strengthen the islands defences after the Russians had briefly occupied the island two years before. Although, the "new" garrison was just the latest in a long line of Swedish military forces protecting the island, and consequently the rest of Sweden, continuously since the 1640s. The exception being the 23 days when Russia occupied the island during the Finnish War (1808–1809), after Gotland had been left undefended due to errors in overall Swedish strategy early in the war.

In 1887, a new country wide conscription system replaced a number of previous regional recruitment and reserve systems, including the Gotlands nationalbeväring (the Gotland National Recruitment). The existing regiment defending Gotland under that system was reorganized into two new regiments, the Gotland Infantry Regiment and the Gotland Artillery Regiment. Those two units would go on to provide the bulk of the garrison forces both directly and indirectly, throughout the various crisis that threatened to overtake Sweden (including two World Wars and the Cold War), for most of the next two centuries right up to the final dissolution of the garrison in 2005.

=== Garrison structure ===
From 1811 to 1873, the commander of military forces on Gotland (at that time, effectively a military district in its own right) also served as the governor of the island and during the existence of the Gotland National Conscription (1811–1892) the commander was by default the senior officer of that regiment. Under the military reorganisation of 1892, the then commander and his successors (up until 1937) automatically became the senior officer of the Gotlands infanteriregemente that succeeded the Gotlands nationalbeväring. He remained in charge of army troops on the island, even though Gotland was no longer the center of a military district under the new 5 area (district) system which lasted up to shortly before World War II.

During World War II, Gotland was part of both the VII Military Area [area=army district] (from 1942) and the Gotland Naval District, both of which the senior military officer on the island acted as head of. Army and air force units assigned to Gotland came under the former, while naval, marine, and coast artillery units based on / out of Gotland came under the jurisdiction of the latter. With a change in the Naval Districts (see naval section below) in 1957, the commanding officer lost his maritime responsibilities, but regained them in the 1966 military reorganisation that created the Gotland Military Command (MKG), and which changed the VII Military Area into the new expanded Eastern Military District (Milo Ö) (also known as Milo Z) which was now headquartered out of Södermanland.

This command structure continued relatively unchanged until the end of the Cold War in the early 1990s, when Milo Ö was stood down in 1991. The MKG remained operational into 2000, albeit increasingly downgraded in importance despite concerns, with a corresponding steady reduction in the units and capabilities under the MKG. In the now discredited Swedish Defence reform of that year, the MKG was replaced with the, in theory, autonomous Gotland Military District (MDG), which despite its name, only had control over the island itself (that control was also severely constrained by the existence of the, later infamous, post-Cold War Swedish Fortifications Agency). In practise this meant the MDG was responsible for overseeing the Army garrison units remaining on the island, along with coordinating with any reserve and civil defence elements still in place. There were, and as of 2015 still are, no maritime or coastal defence units remaining on the island, with the exception of a couple of naval units that did not come under the new MDG and which in any case were withdrawn in 2004. The MDG was stood down in December 2004, with the remaining garrison forces being abolished in 2005.

=== Elements of the former garrison: Navy ===
==== 1700–1970s ====
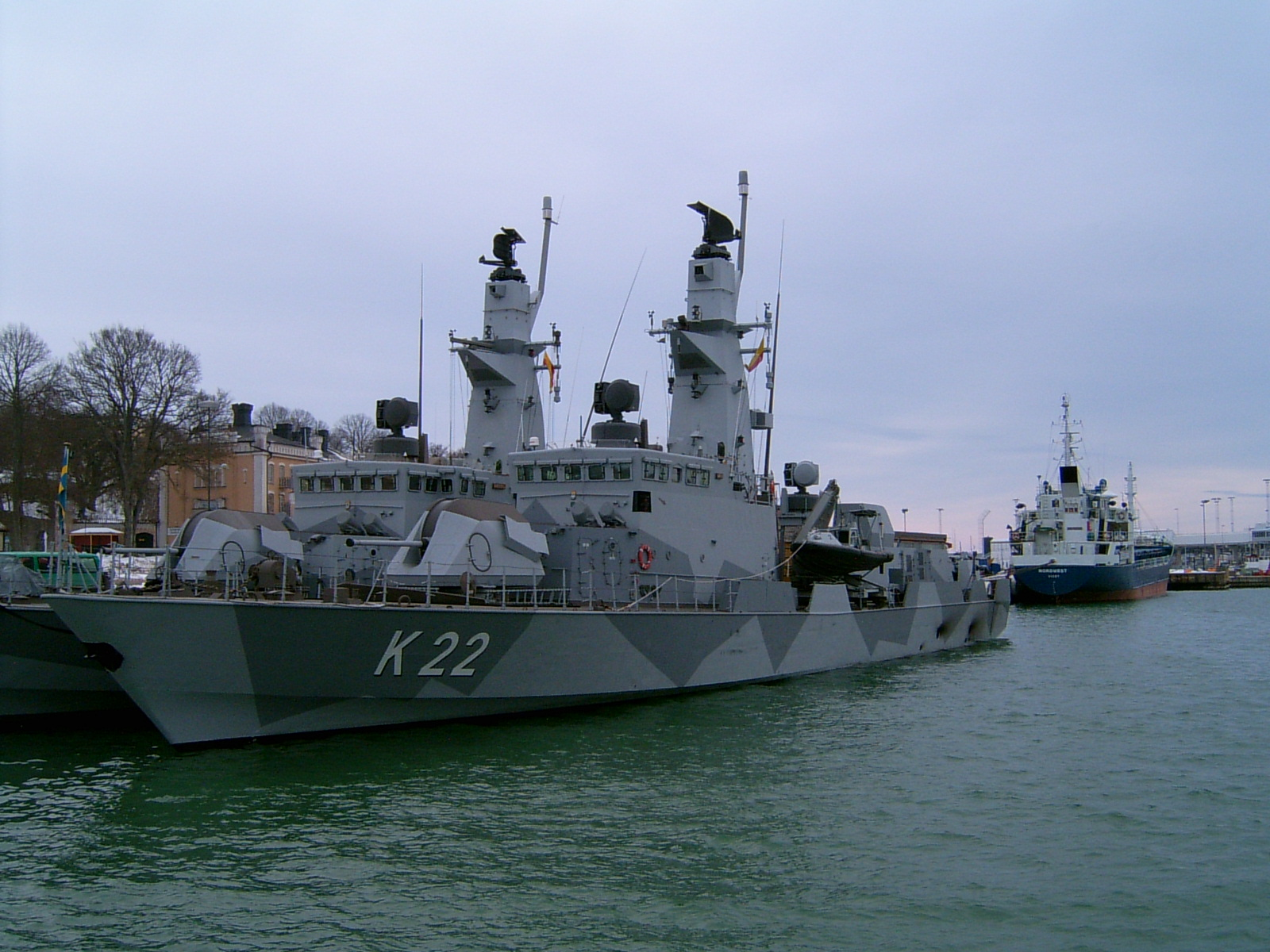
HSwMS Gävle in Visby harbour in 2006, alongside an unidentified sister ship of the Göteborg-class

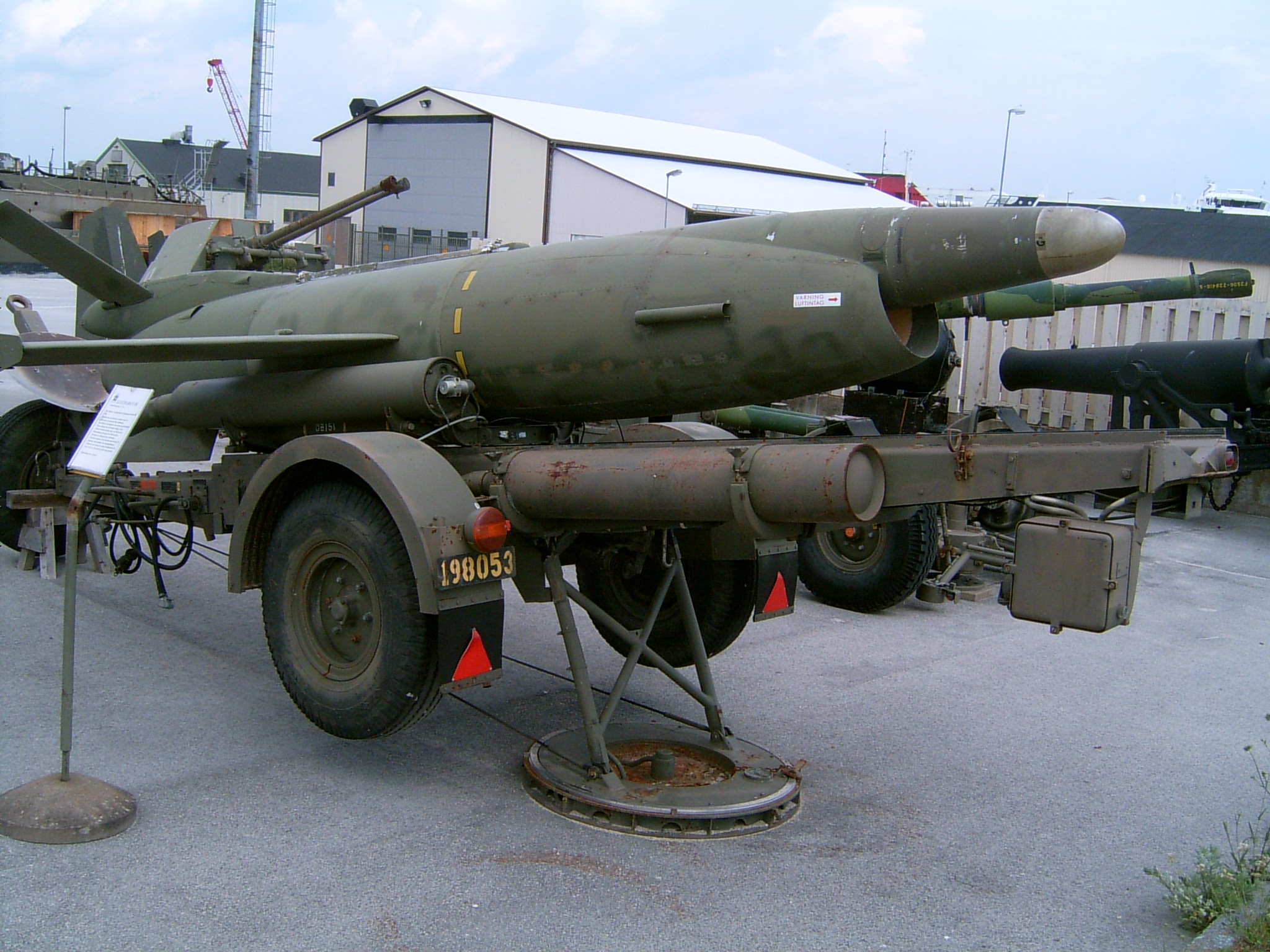
Swedish coastal missile Saab Robot 08 (Kustrobot 08) at the museum at Gotland Coastal Artillery Regiment (KA 3) in Fårösund, Sweden

Alongside the Swedish Army, the Swedish Navy have played a major role in the garrisoning of the island over the last two centuries; not only helping to defend the island but also using it as a well placed base to defend Sweden and its interests in the Baltic Sea. Prior to (from 1931) and during World War II, Gotland was the headquarters of the Gotland Naval District. In 1957, during the Cold War, Gotland became part of the (now defunct) Sound Naval District, headquartered at the Muskö Naval Base. The Sound Naval District itself came under the new joint Eastern Military District in 1966, with operational control of naval units (including coastal defence forces) in the area of the former Gotland Naval District being returned to the commanding officer of the new MKG centered on Gotland.

In the early part of the Cold War (late 1940s to late 1950s), elements of one of the three major task forces that then made up the navy's front line strength, including cruisers and destroyers, were based out of Gotland's various anchorages and harbours. This was in addition to locally based elements of the Coastal Artillery's significant support fleet, which included coastal minelayers, inshore minesweepers, and patrol craft. However, in 1958, a doctrinal switch from heavier surface combatants to smaller ASW combatants (increasingly corvette sized and smaller) and Fast Attack Craft began with most of the former being retired without replacement. The operations of these new combatants were still coordinated with submarines though, which, along with the fact that some major combatants weren't immediately retired (e.g. the two Halland-class destroyers), ironically helped to disguise the problems with relying so heavily on light combatants in the short term. In the late 1960s, this shift towards lighter types accelerated, though more for political and economic reasons than military.

For Gotland, this meant that the naval units based out of the island by the 1970s were mostly light combatants such as FACs with relatively short range, though there were still a few larger corvettes mixed in. Submarines were generally not based out of Gotland at this point, being housed in purpose built bases such as Muskö, though they still made port visits.

==== 1980s– ====
By the early 1980s, flaws with the "FAC based doctrine" had become impossible to ignore, with incidents such as the so-called Whiskey on the rocks confrontation proving that the Swedish Navy had become outgunned in the Anti-surface warfare arena, and that even in areas where it should have had a local advantage in such as Anti-Submarine Warfare it was materially outmatched by potential aggressors, with intruding submarines able to breach Swedish waters almost at will.

In the short term, the navy and government attempted to address these issues with various emergency measures and programs, such as the hasty revamping of the Ytattack-81 (the Surface combatant-81) project into what would become the Stockholm corvette program. Another hastily introduced program was the construction of four new heavy coastal missile batteries based around the Rb 15 missile, one of which was placed on Gotland. Delivery and installation of the systems was to take place from 1987 to 1992. Existing installations such as coastal gun batteries and mine stations were continuously upgraded. In the longer term, among the new programs that were started in the late 1980s were two to provide replacements for various FAC and corvette classes as well as to provide a new class of destroyers; the Ytstridsfartyg Mindre (the Surface Combatant Small) and the Ytstridsfartyg Större (the Surface Combatant Large) programs. In the post-Cold War cutbacks of the early 1990s, those two programs were merged into a single program, the YS2000 (the Surface Combatant 2000) program, that later became the Visby-class stealth corvette. Originally, it was planned to have a class of 10 in two variants; the ASuW/Anti-Air 'Series II' and a lower cost ASW dedicated 'Series I'. Finally, only four Series Is and a single Series II were built in the 2000s (with a second Series II being cancelled), and even those were not fully manned or equipped as part of further economy measures to support other non-defence areas. As a result of this reduction in class size being decided on in the late 1990s, plans for some of the Visby-class corvettes to be based out of Gotland were scrapped. This was against a background of severe cutbacks for the navy at that time, which would continue into the 2010s. Those cutbacks apparently also led to the cancellation, just prior to the disbanding of all coastal defence units on Gotland, of plans to install elements of the KAFUS coastal/underwater surveillance network (Note: This system was described as consisting of "hydrophones, magnetic and other sensors, TV and other surveillance sets, linked by fiber-optic communications." The primary contractor for the program was Datasaab (later Ericsson Information Systems). KAFUS may have been related to the Finnish FHS-900 underwater detection system.) in and around the island.

In an echo of events from over 60 years earlier, the navy would lose its Marinflyget in 1998, with its helicopter units being absorbed by the air force's new 'joint' Swedish Armed Forces Helicopter Wing (the Army also losing its helicopters to this new wing). The air force then promptly retired the former navy ASW helicopters (Note: Some were converted to, and lasted as transport helicopters until 2008.) without any immediate replacement.

The resulting lack of ASW helicopters, along with the operationally incomplete state of the Visby-class corvettes, were issues that would become apparent just under a decade and a half later, during the 'October 2014 Submarine incident' when the military made a prolonged search without any public results, for alleged underwater activity.

=== Elements of the former garrison: Air Force ===
==== 1920s–1980s ====
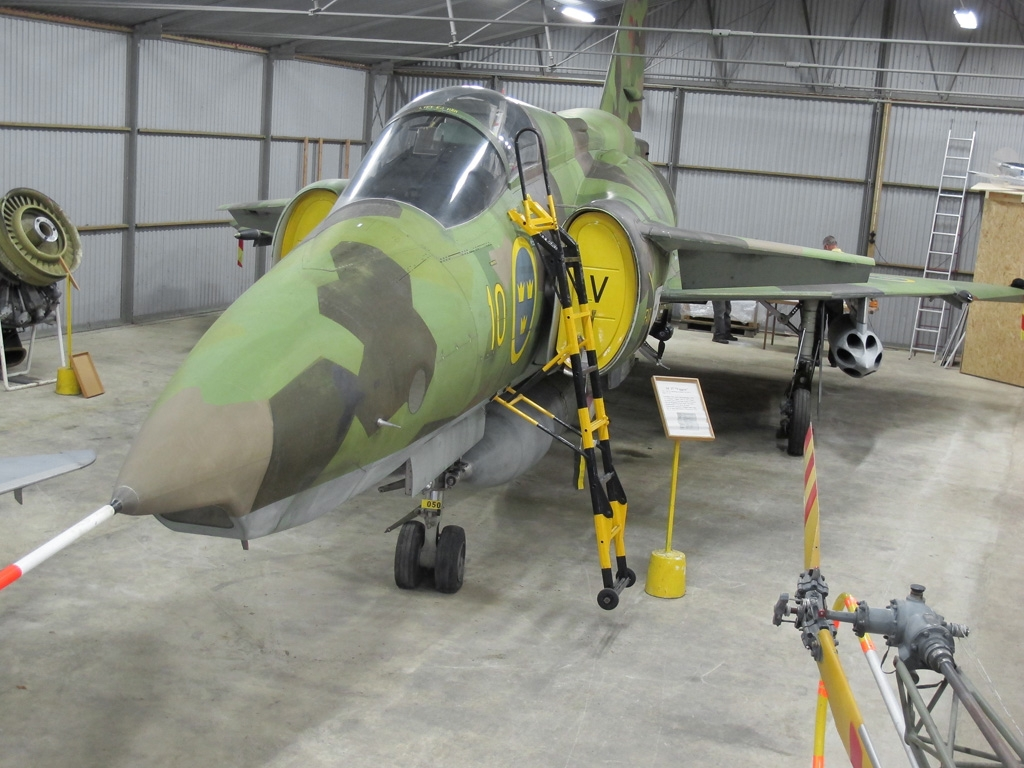
AJSF 37 Viggen (37972) on display at the Gotlands Försvarsmuseum

Since the late 1920s, the Swedish Air Force have also played an important part in Gotland's defence, especially during World War II and the succeeding Cold War. Created by the amalgamation of the air arms of both the Army and the Navy in 1926, the formation of the new air force would leave the navy without an air branch until it was reestablished in the late 1950s with the navy's first helicopters. Swedish Naval aviation had already established a major presence on the island in the late 1910s, so the air force was able to take over or share some facilities with the navy, as well as building ones of its own, such as the Bunge and Roma airfields in the late 1930s. By the outbreak of World War II, the Flygvapnet was well established on Gotland. The air force's general wartime strategy in regards to Gotland was primarily based around bombers, in particular 20 B17s based at Bunge airfield and seaplane torpedo bombers out of Fårösund. The intention was to use them against enemy ships in the support of the navy and coastal defence units (including both gun batteries and minefields), that were the islands first line of defence against an invasion. The air force also had fighters and reconnaissance aircraft based on the island to further support the island's defence, the latter also including seaplanes.

Even into the Jet Age, and the Cold War, the Swedish Air Force insisted on remaining being able to operate from semi-prepared airstrips and dispersed emergency airfields, which influenced its equipment development and procurement choices greatly along with the development of tactics and strategies. This allowed the air force major flexibility in its role of defending Gotland and the rest of Sweden against intruders. In some respects, this flexibility made the air force more capable than most NATO member airforces who, especially before the advent of such aircraft as the Harrier and the A-10, were arguably over reliant on permanent airbases and long concrete runways, unlike their Soviet foes, who put in at least as much effort as Sweden into being able to disperse and operate their tactical aircraft from semi-prepared airstrips and other temporary or semi-permanent locations, including those based around specially strengthened stretches of road.

For Gotland, this meant the air force was not only able to operate out of Visby Airport (especially after its BAS-60 upgrade in 1968) and its existing airfields such as Bunge and Roma, but also from semi-prepared sites such as the Visby 1 and Visby 2 highway strips, which were officially classified as dispersed emergency (wartime) airfields as per Sweden's general overall Cold War doctrine.

Apart from the threat of direct Soviet aggression against Gotland and the rest of Sweden, another potential wartime problem was to increasingly weigh on the minds of both the island's defenders and Sweden's politicians: cruise missile transits. In the event of an all out war, the airspace of neutral Sweden was seen by both NATO and Warsaw Pact planners as a possible handy shortcut for the flight paths of cruise missiles that both sides were developing, and in the case of the United States had already deployed, during the 1980s. The airspace in and around Gotland was one of the areas of Sweden seen as especially vulnerable to transit by cruise missiles en route to their targets. A particular worry in Sweden in the early 1980s was that the US would program some of their new nuclear armed cruise missiles to fly through Swedish airspace on their way to targets in the Soviet Union. This was seen as a violation of the country's neutrality, so Sweden officially stated that it would be obliged to shoot down any such missiles that were fired over Swedish territory in wartime. In light of this policy a number of major anti-cruise missile exercises were held by Sweden during the 1980s, at least one of which was held in and around the island. As the decade went on, fears grew that the Soviet Union would be at least just as likely to violate Sweden's neutrality in this manner; such fears regarding the two superpowers were only partially eased by the advent of the (effectively defunct as of 2014) INF Treaty.

Late 1980s plans to reinforce the air cover over Gotland, including one for the reactivation and deployment to the island of an additional J 35 Draken squadron to take place in the early 1990s, were to be overtaken by world events such as the Revolutions of 1989 and the Soviet dissolution.

==== 1990s– ====
After the end of the Cold War, the air force's presence on Gotland had rapidly diminished to practically nothing by 1992, with the final withdrawal of deployed elements of the Bråvalla Wing (F 13) including a Saab 37 Viggen fighter detachment from Visby Airport. This was a direct result of the initial cutbacks by Swedish politicians seeking the peace dividend in order to, among other things, to fund increasingly costly social programs in an economic downturn (in part caused by the fall of the Soviet Union). Due to this, the Bunge airfield was closed in 1991. The Roma airfield had been deactivated in 1988. In the intervening years, the air force has been absent from Gotland, with only the occasional transport or support aircraft (such as ASC 890 Airborne early warning and control) making visits to Visby Airport as part of an exercise or similar.

In the 2010s, the relatively dilapidated state of the county's defences had to be addressed by the Swedish government, with a newly resurgent Russia stepping up probes of Sweden's defences alongside those of her neighbours with both air and sea incursions. The most noted of these to date occurred in March 2013, when two Russian Tupolev Tu-22M nuclear capable bombers, escorted by four Sukhoi Su-27, were able to enter Swedish controlled airspace unimpeded and simulate strikes against targets in and around Stockholm with the Swedish Air Force unable to effectively respond at any time during the incident. During their operation, the Russian aircraft skirted around Gotland. In the aftermath of this highly controversial failure to avert the intruders, the air force for the first time in many years deployed a detachment of four Saab JAS 39 Gripen fighters to Visby Airport. This short lived deployment was followed by another smaller one the following year, consisting of two Gripens. However, because of their strictly limited nature, these deployments were seen by observers as unsuccessful PR exercises rather than a coherent response. By the close of 2014, Swedish public confidence in the government's ability to defend the country had dropped to 20% or lower, depending on the poll. This was a continuation of a general trend that could be traced back to even before the Stockholm incident, but which had rapidly worsened in its aftermath.

In late March 2015, it was reported that plans were at an advanced stage for a support helicopter squadron and a "fast response Gripen jet squadron" to be based on Gotland in order to support the new garrison and further reinforce the island's defences.

== Tofta firing range ==
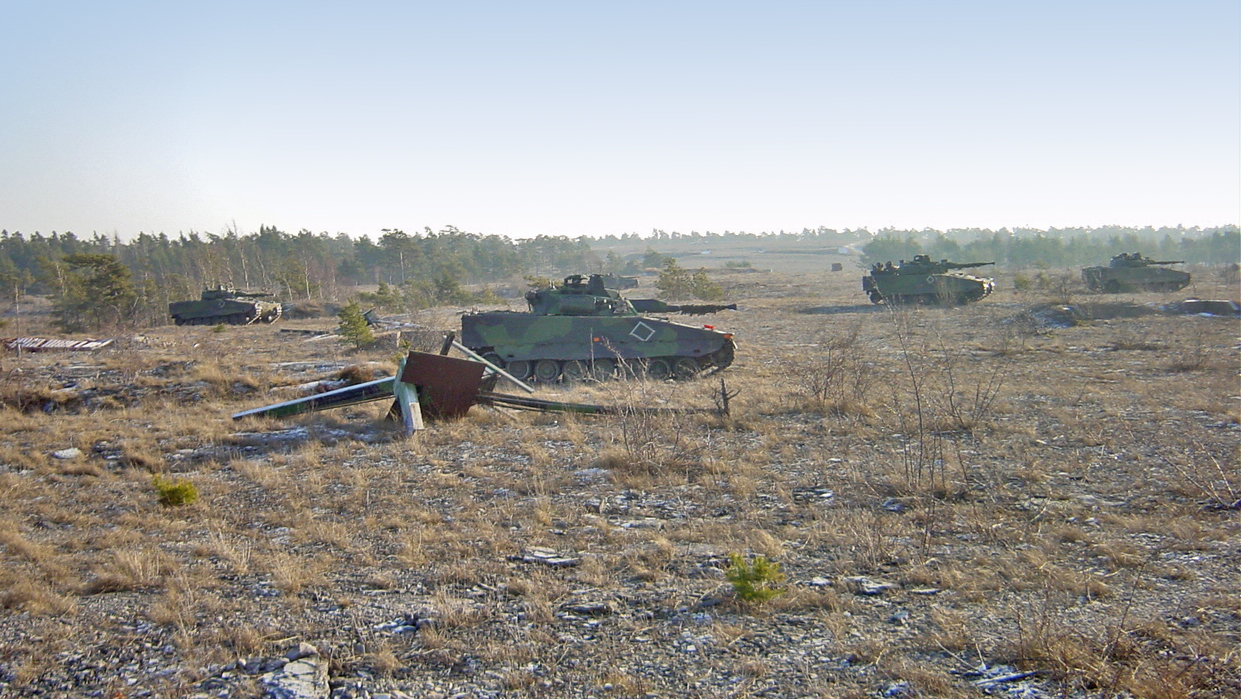
A 2005 photo of 4 IFVs (Stridsfordon 90) during an exercise at the Tofta skjutfält

The Tofta firing range (also known as the Tofta Tank firing range), is a military training ground which is located 8 km (5.0 mi) south of Visby. Another less common name for the range is the Toftasjön firing range. Tracing its origins back to 1898, as of 2008 the range extended over 2,700 acres (11 km^{2}). It was a major training and storage facility for the Gotland garrison during its existence, and was still occasionally used for training by various elements of the Armed Forces since the garrison was shut down in 2005. However, from the second half of 2014 onwards, there has been a marked increase in the use of the range, especially by armoured units (mostly company sized), as tensions in Northeastern Europe have escalated. At least one of the buildings on the range, the former tank repair shop, is currently owned by a private company (Peab), with the military renting back the top floor for its own use.

When not used by the military, a number of cultural and sports events have been held at the range. The Gotland Grand National, the world's largest enduro race, was held on the range from 1984 to 2023.

== Gotlandsgruppen ==
Succeeding the MDG since 2005, the Gotlandsgruppen (the Gotland's Group) is an administrative group currently consisting of about eight regular officers at any one time. It is nominally responsible for overseeing the maintenance of military facilities along with related activities on the island, though in practice any real authority lies either with the Swedish Fortifications Agency or else the 1st Marine Regiment (1 Amf). In theory, the Gotlandsbataljonen also comes under the purview of the Gotlandsgruppen but again in practice they report directly to their current parent regiment, the 1st Marine Regiment, except for the day to day tasks that the Regimental HQ delegates to the Gotlandsgruppen officers on the ground. Much the same arrangement exists at the Tofta firing range; as of 2015, the range comes directly under the 1st Marine Regiment for administrative and most operational matters. For work directly onsite, including oversight of any civilian contractors on long term contract or call, the job is again delegated to the Gotlandsgruppen, who have their offices in the range.

The unit crest of the Gotlandsgruppen is the same as that of the former Gotland Military Command.

== Battlegroup Gotland ==
In April 2015, a decision was made to reestablish troops permanently on Gotland within three years. The recruitment started in September 2015. The Battlegroup Gotland is to consist of 300 personnel, half of which are soldiers and half a permanent staff. As of 2016, the main issue of where to house the battle group was still unresolved. The barracks in Visby formerly owned and used by Gotland Regiment were evacuated and sold to a private company in 2006. Since 2006, the property is used by the Gotland County Administration and several private companies.

The re-militarization of Gotland once again reopened the debate about a possible threat to Sweden from Russia and Sweden's accession to NATO.

The Battlegroup Gotland (18th Battlegroup) will fall under administrative control of the Skaraborg Regiment, which will also train the troops destined for Gotland. The battlegroup will be based at the Tofta firing range near Visby and will field 301 men.

- 18th Battlegroup (18. Stridsgruppen):
  - 180th Staff Company "Havdhem"
  - 181st Armored Infantry Company "Roma" with 12 × Strf 9040B infantry fighting vehicles, 1 × Bgbv 90 armored recovery vehicle and 1 × Bandvagn 309 tracked ambulance vehicle
  - 183rd Tank Company "Lärbro" with 11 × Stridsvagn 122 main battle tanks, 1 × Epbv 90 forward observation vehicle, 1 × Bgbv 120 armored recovery vehicle, 1 × Strf 9040B infantry fighting vehicle and 1 × Bandvagn 309 tracked ambulance vehicle
  - 185th Logistic Company "Garde"

In the meantime, before the 18th Battlegroup is ready for deployment on Gotland (originally scheduled to begin in 2018), it was hoped that a combination of an increase in training rotations by mainland based regular army units to the Tofta range, combined with some rather public exercises around the island by the Särskilda operationsgruppen since late 2015, would be enough to discourage any Russian adventurism.

However, by Autumn 2016, the regional situation was considered to have deteriorated even further. So much so that following representations from the current Supreme Commander Micael Bydén, the Swedish Government reluctantly agreed that Gotland's defences would have to be reestablished on a much shorter timescale than previously mooted (despite ongoing major divisions within the current ruling parties with regards as to the strategy & resources required to defend Sweden). To this end, the Supreme Commander announced on 14 September 2016 that not only would the deployment of the 18th Battlegroup to Gotland would be moved up to the first half of 2017, but also a rifle battalion from the Skaraborg Regiment which was then in the middle of a training rotation at Tofta, would now be held in place on Gotland as an interim garrison. A few Giraffe 40s normally on the strength of the Air Defence Regiment (Lv 6) are to be attached to the battalion to provide some early warning capability. Despite this though, neither air defence vehicles such as the Luftvärnskanonvagn (lvkv) 9040, nor MANPADS have been attached to the garrison battalion to take advantage of this local radar coverage.

The plan is to within a few months relieve the battalion with another battalion or an equivalent formation, which will then remain in place until the 18th Battlegroup is ready to take up its posting.

== See also ==
- 7.5 cm tornpjäs m/57
- 12 cm tornautomatpjäs m/70
- Archipelago fleet
- Bantam (Rb 53)
- Battle of Mästerby
- Battle of Visby
- Carl Gustav m/45
- Coast Guard (Sweden)
- Cold War II
- Current Swedish defence doctrine
- Dominium maris baltici
- Fårösund
- Gillis Bildt
- Göteborg-class corvette
- Kustjägarna
- List of military aircraft of Sweden
- m/96 and m/38 Mauser rifles
- Military equipment of Sweden during the Cold War
- Politics of Sweden
- Russia–Sweden relations
- Saab 17
- Saab 18
- Saab 29 Tunnan
- Saab 32 Lansen
- Saab Rb 04 air launched Anti-Ship missile
- Saab Rb 05 Air to Ground missile
- Stridsvagn 103 (S-Tank)
- Sweden during World War II
- Swedish Home Guard
- Swedish military bicycle
- Torstenson War
- Treaty of Gotland (1288)
- Visby city wall
