= Mästerby =

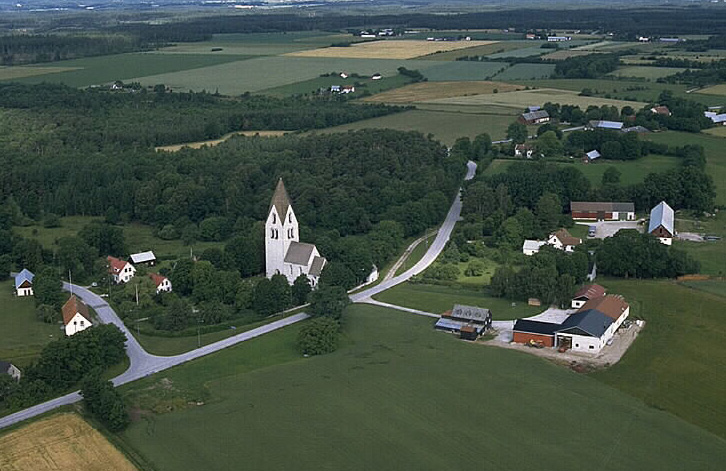
- Mästerby church

- Location within Gotland
- Coordinates: 57°28′12″N 18°18′14″E
- Country: Sweden
- Province: Gotland
- County: Gotland County
- Municipality: Gotland Municipality

Area
  - Total: 22.97 km^{2} (8.87 sq mi)

Population (2014)
  - Total: 181
- Time zone: UTC+1 (CET)
  - Summer (DST): UTC+2 (CEST)
- Website: Mästerby

Mästerby is a populated area, a socken or administrative parish (not to be confused with ecclesiastical parish), on the Swedish island of Gotland. It comprises the same area as the administrative Mästerby District, established on 1 January 2016.

When King Valdemar IV of Denmark and his troops invaded Gotland in 1361, they met the first line of resistance at the Battle of Mästerby.

== Geography ==
Mästerby is the name of the socken as well as the district. It is also the name of the small village surrounding the medieval Mästerby Church, sometimes referred to as Mästerby kyrkby. It is situated on central Gotland. Mästerby consists of a number of farms spread over a larger area.

Mästerby parish was independent until 2012. As of 2019, Mästerby Church belongs to Sanda-Västergarn-Mästerby parish in Klinte pastorat, along with the churches in Sanda and Västergarn.

One of the asteroids in the Asteroid belt, 10813 Mästerby, is named after the settlement.

== History ==
Mästerby has been a settlement since prehistoric times. A great number of archaeological finds have been made here along with grave fields, stone mounds and traces of houses dating from the Bronze, Iron and Viking Ages as well as from Medieval times. The finds also include a number of metal objects, jewelry and coins with the oldest coin a Roman dinar dated 160–180.

The name Mästerby originates from the Old Gutnish word maister meaning "master" or "foremost". In 1270, the name was written as "Mestraby", "Meystbye" in the 14th century and "Mesteby" in 1523.

The courthouse for southern Gotland was situated at Mästerby, along with a gallows and a place for corporal punishment from 1000 until the end of the 16th century. The last execution was the hanging of Anders Botelson from Gothem in 1698, for stealing from a church.

== Battle of Mästerby ==
Battle of Mästerby
- Part of the prelude to the Second Danish-Hanseatic War and Valdemar Atterdag's invasion of Gotland
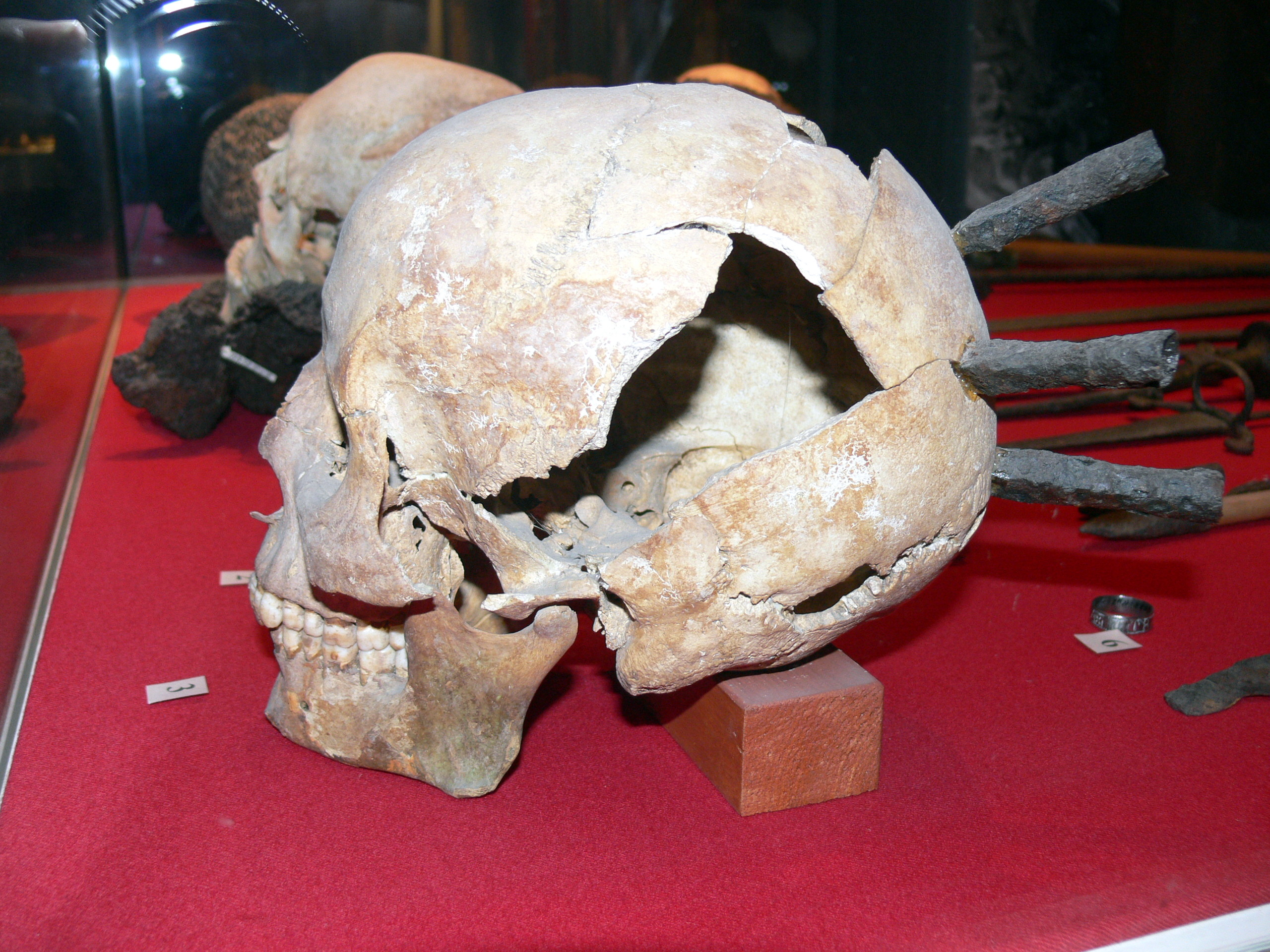
- The skull of a participant in the 1361 campaign, shot by three arrows.
Date	25 July 1361
Location	Mästerby, Gotland
Result	Danish victory

Belligerents
Kingdom of Sweden; Gotland	Kingdom of Denmark

Commanders and leaders
Gotlandic Farmers	Valdemar IV of Denmark

Strength
About 1,500	2,600

Casualties and losses
1,500	Unknown

When Danish troops invaded Gotland in 1361, they met the first line of resistance at Fjäle mire. This resulted in the Battle of Mästerby on the 25 July 1361. Through battlefield archaeology and some written accounts, archeologists have pieced together a likely course of events.

=== Battle ===
In an effort to stop the Danish soldiers from advancing, the bridge at Ajmunds was destroyed. The Danes tried to cross the stream, but that proved to be a tactical error since the banks were very steep, which made it hard for the heavily armed soldiers to advance. They therefore retreated and sent out scouts to search for a better crossing, while the main body of troops rested for the night. Finally the Danes found a crossing a kilometre to the northeast at Fjäle mire, where they crossed. The Gotlandic farmers who were trying to stop the invaders had hoped that the Danish soldiers with their heavy armour and equipment would have a hard time moving about in the mire, but the summer had been hot and the mire was almost dry. The failure of the plan resulted in a massacre, about 1,500 Gotlandic farmers and other local inhabitants being killed by the Danish invaders.

=== Memorial ===
A couple of decades after the battle a memorial for the fallen Gotlanders was built at Grens farm. The memorial is in the shape of a celtic cross, on Gotland known as a "Branch cross" or a "Ring cross".

Fragments of an inscription can be found on the cross. The legible text is Anno Domini MCCCLXI (Roman numerals for "1361") and finally the word Iacobi (Latin for Saint Jacob and his day in the calendar). From this it was deduced that the battle took place on the day of Jacobi, 25 July 1361.

At the Ajmunds bridge stands another memorial honoring the Gotlanders who died defending their freedom. The stone was raised in 1961, 600 years after the battle.

=== Legend ===
A priest in Mästerby parish, Hans Nielssön Strelow, wrote the Cronica Guthilandorium ("Chronicle of Gotland") in 1633. This is the only remaining written account mentioning the battle but written 300 years after the event. The chronicle was the only document remaining after a fire at the Mästerby vicarage in 1735.

The legend written in the "Chronicle" states that King Valdemar Atterdag's forces landed at the Kronvall fishing village on the main island opposite Lilla Karlsö and Stora Karlsö. They were opposed by Gotlandic farmers at Fjäle mire. The fighting went on for two days between 25–26 July 1361, outside Mästerby. King Valdemar erected a cross to honour the brave farmers and moved on to Visby.

Historians realized that it was unlikely that King Valdemar would have honoured his fallen enemies, but the battlefield team from the Swedish National Heritage Board, the archeologist Maria Lingström and the Mästerby History Society decided to investigate if there was any truth to the legend.

=== Battlefield archaeology ===
Investigation of the site, led by Lingström, has been conducted every year since 2006. Up until 2011, hundreds of finds related to the battle have been made. The distribution and nature of the finds indicate that the main battle occurred in a sandy part of the mire, where Danish troops crossed and advanced on Mästerby.

The finds from the investigations are on display at a small museum in Mästerby, run by the Mästerby Historical Society, and at the Gotland museum in Visby.

The battle has been reenacted by participants from historical societies from a number of countries, in connection with the reenactment of the Battle of Visby.

== Gallery ==
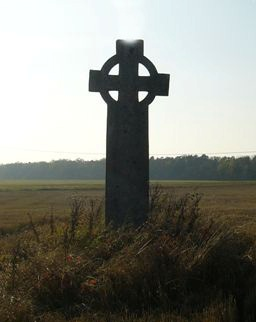
Grenskorset, in memory of the Gotlanders who fought the Danes at Mästerby in 1361.

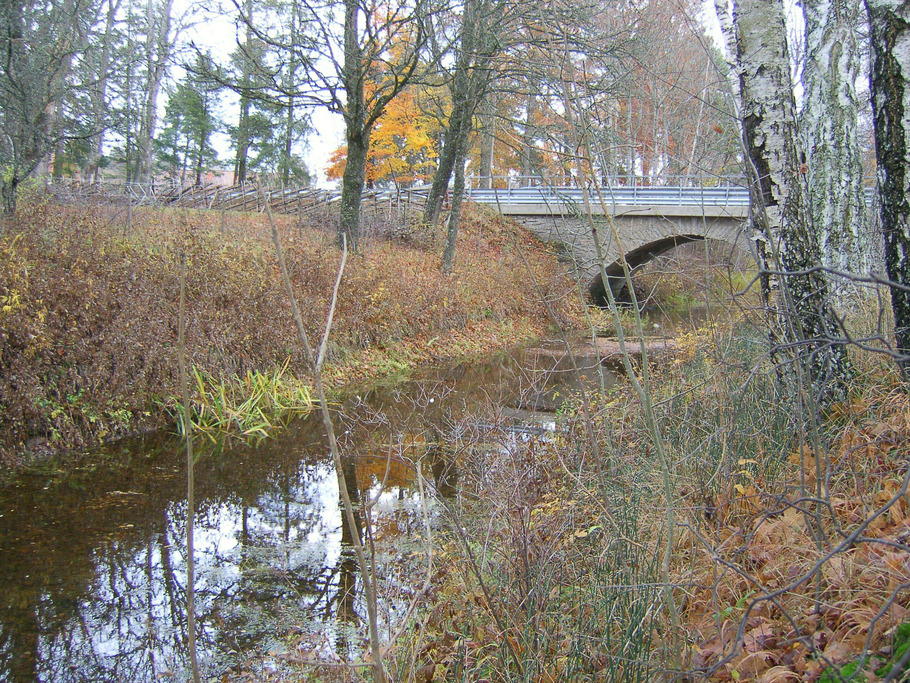
Bridge at Ajmunds, Mästerby. Modern bridge at the same place as the medieval.

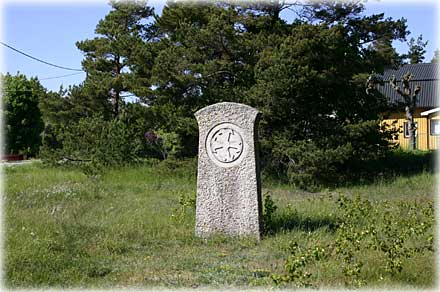
Memorial at the Ajmunds bridge dedicated to the Gotlanders who fought and died for their freedom in 1361. Built in 1961, 600 years after the battle.

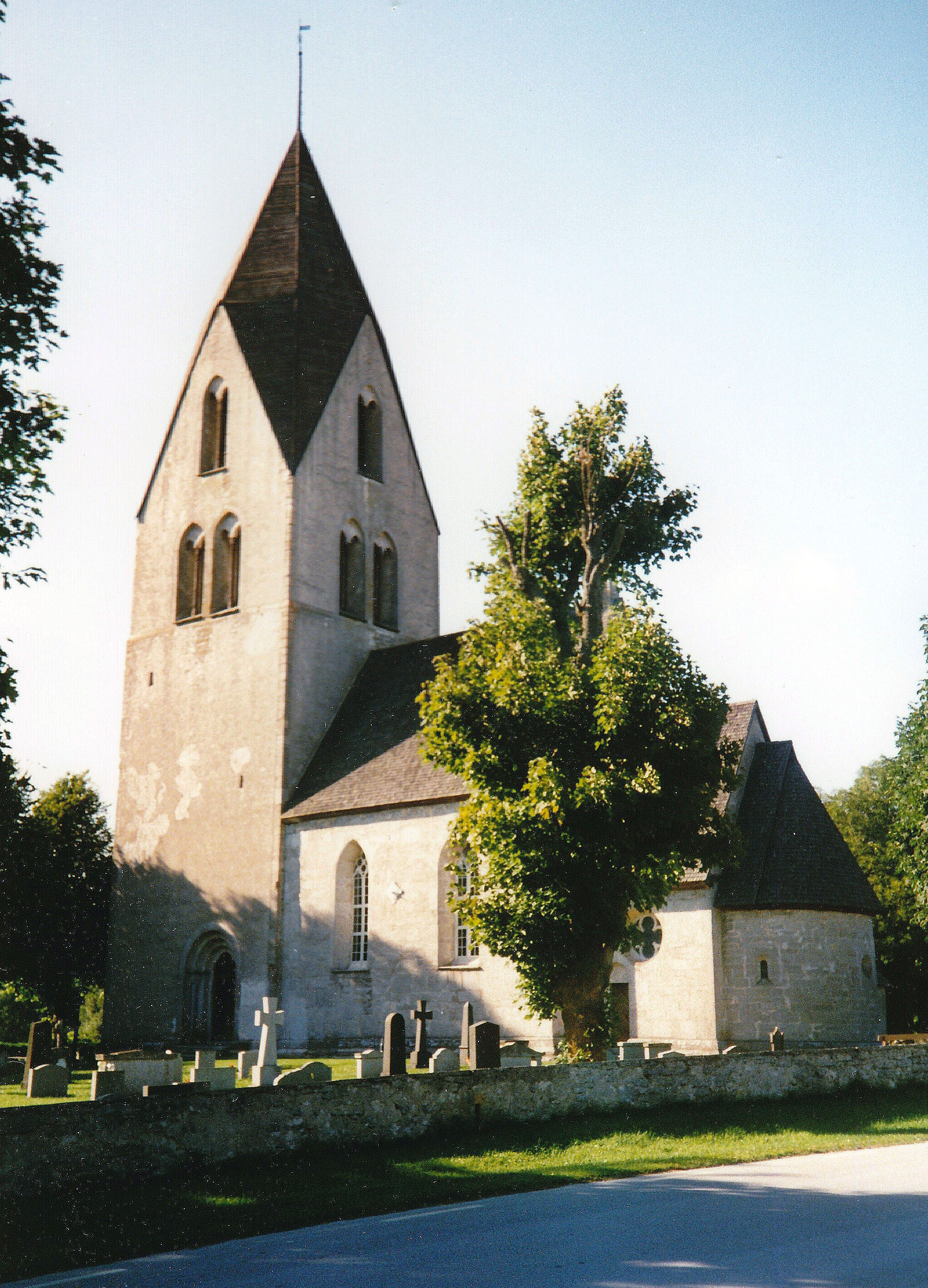
Mästerby church.

== See also ==
- Military on Gotland
- Battle of Visby
