= Valdemar Atterdag holding Visby to ransom, 1361 =

1882 painting by Carl Gustaf Hellqvist

- Valdemar Atterdag brandskattar Visby (Swedish)
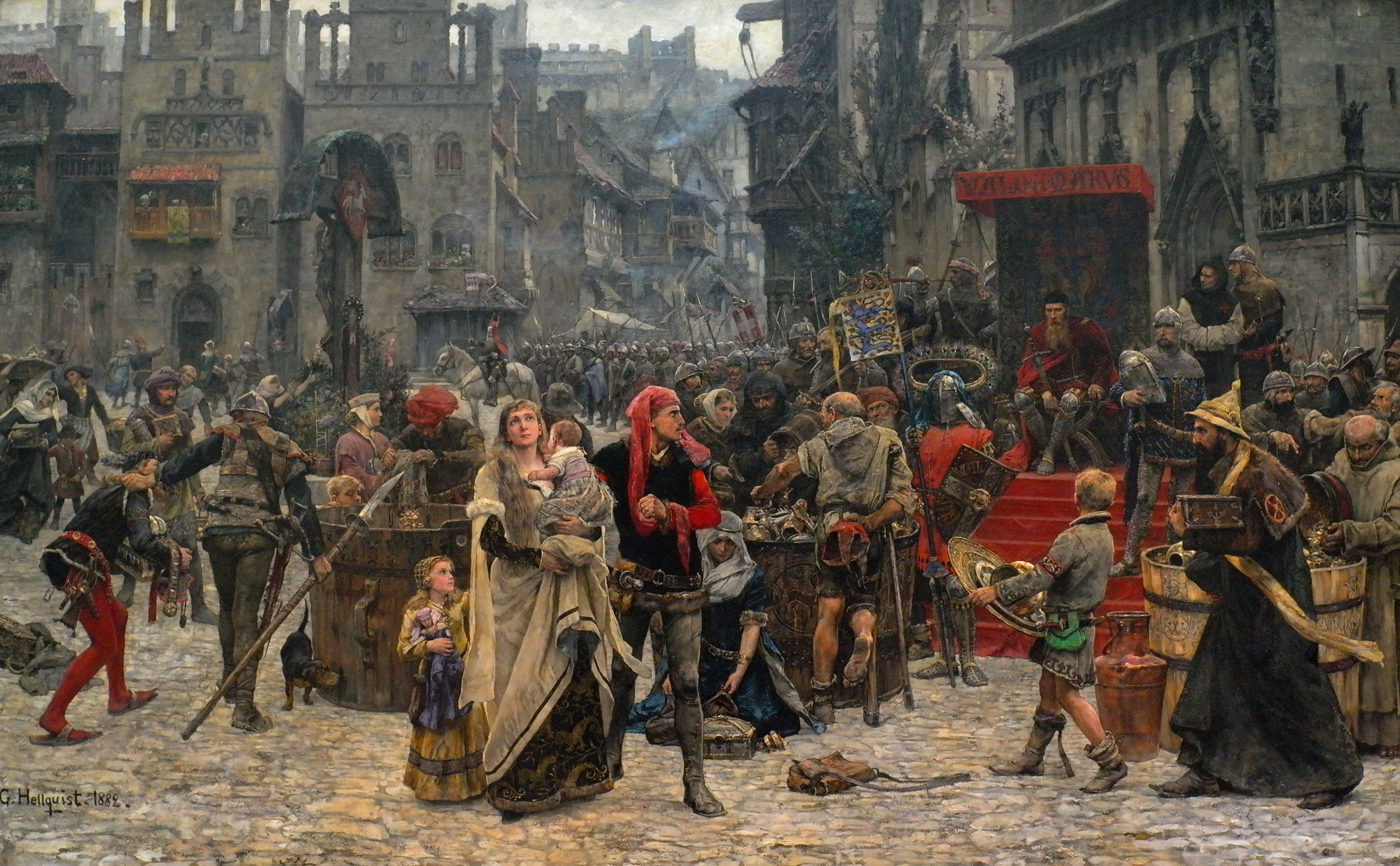
- Artist: Carl Gustaf Hellqvist
- Year: 1882
- Medium: Oil on canvas
- Subject: Valdemar IV of Denmark; Carl Gustaf Hellqvist
- Dimensions: 200 cm × 330 cm (79 in × 130 in)
- Location: Nationalmuseum; Stockholm, Sweden
- Accession: NM 1431

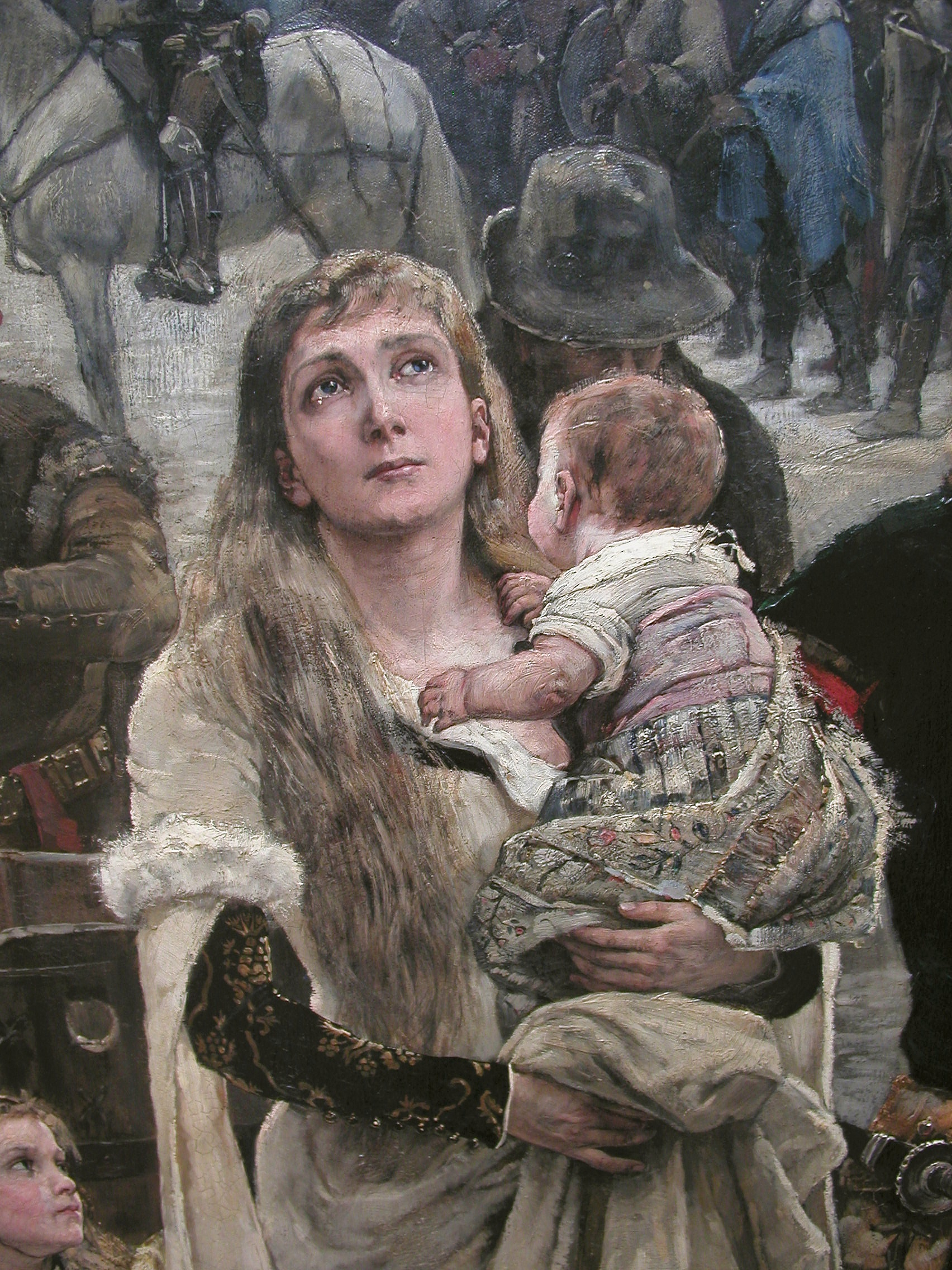
Detail from the painting.

Valdemar Atterdag holding Visby to ransom, 1361 is a historical painting (oil on canvas, signed in 1882) by the Swedish historical painter Carl Gustaf Hellqvist (1851–1890).

This painting depicts how the Danish king Valdemar IV (a.k.a. Valdemar Atterdag) collects treasures from the people in the Gotlandic medieval town of Visby in the summer of 1361 following the Battle of Visby. If the town's people do not fill the three big beer vats with gold, silver and other riches, Valdemar will see to that the whole town is burned to the ground. This type of taxation is known as fire taxation (Swedish: brandskattning).

King Valdemar Atterdag sits to the right, on an elevated red throne in front of the large St. Catherine's church, and observes the town dwellers as they run to fill the vats. At the centre of the painting, the main characters are seen—i.e. the mayor and his family. The mayor clenches his fist in wrath and looks at the Danish king, while his wife looks up to the sky, towards God. The wife plays the role of Virgin Mary, and she has a tear drop in the corner of her eye.

The painting was made in Munich in the 1880s, about half a millennium after the actual event of 1361, hence there are some incorrect details in the painting—though Carl Gustaf Hellqvist was very ambitious when making pictures that were true to the period—for instance the dachshund that is seen at the very left beer vat and the medieval houses in the background: The first dachshund was bred in the 16th century, not in the 14th century, thus an anachronism. For the houses in the background, there have never been any buildings like these in Visby—instead Hellqvist saw houses like these when he was travelling around in northern Germany. The mother in the midsection has her hair uncovered, although 14th century married women usually had their hair covered.

"Valdemar Atterdag holding Visby to ransom, 1361" or "Valdemar Atterdag imposes a levy on Visby, 1361" was awarded a gold medal in Vienna, Austria, in 1882 and is now a part of the collections of the National Museum of Fine Arts in Stockholm, Sweden.

The original Swedish title for this painting is "Valdemar Atterdag brandskattar Visby den 27 juli 1361" and its dimensions are 201 cm × 327 cm (79.2″ × 128.8″).
