= Mästerby Church =

- Mästerby kyrka
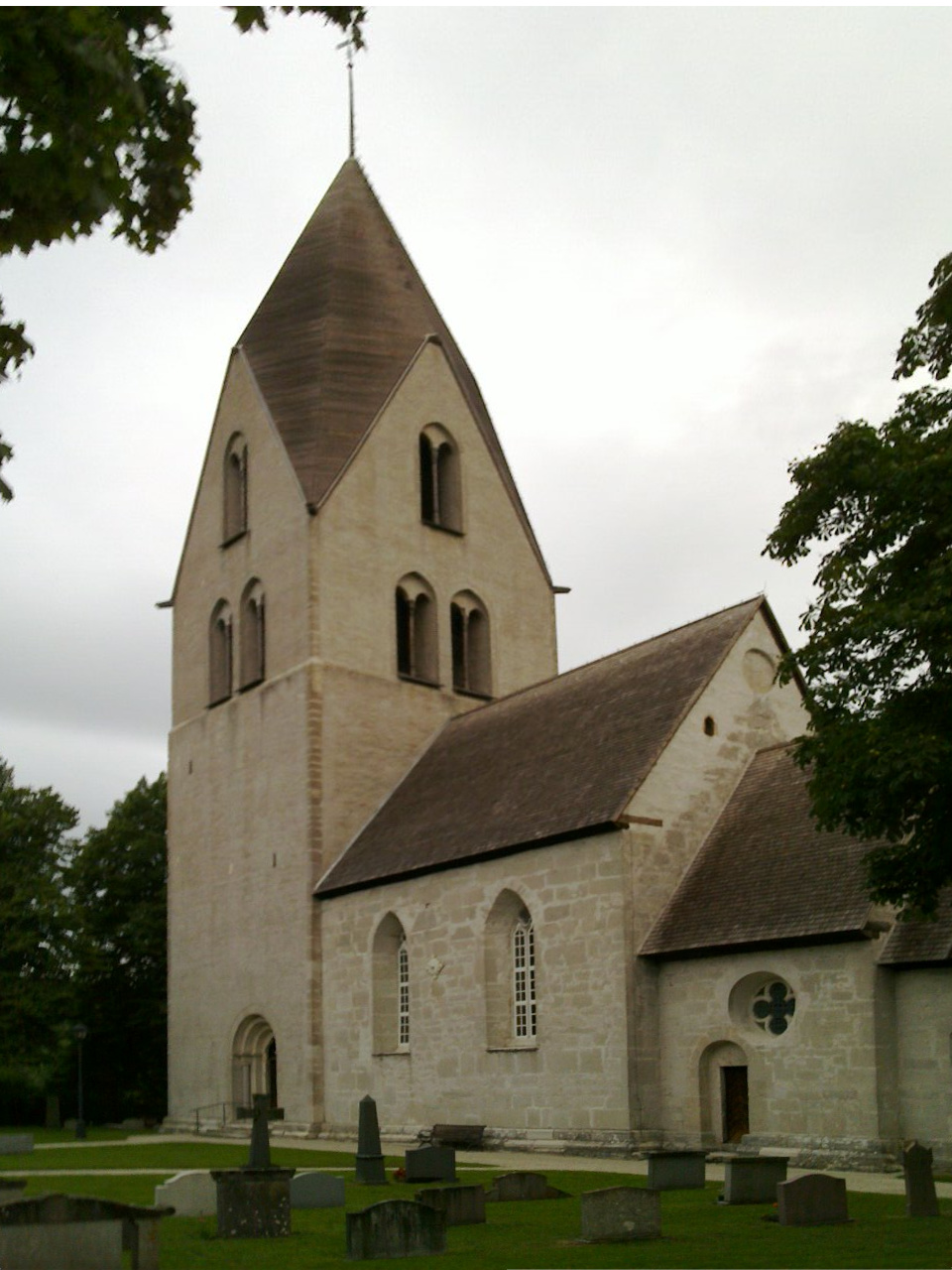
- Mästerby Church, view of the exterior

- Location on Gotland
- 57°28′12″N 18°18′14″E
- Country: Sweden
- Denomination: Church of Sweden

Administration
- Diocese: Visby

Mästerby Church (Swedish: Mästerby kyrka) is a medieval church in Mästerby on the Swedish island of Gotland. It is richly decorated with medieval murals. Mästerby Church belongs to the Diocese of Visby.

== History and architecture ==
Mästerby Church dates largely from the 13th century. The nave, choir and apse were built first, at the beginning of the century. In the middle of the same century, the tower was also built. The nave was made higher about a century later, and at this time both the nave and choir received vaulted ceilings. The church has remained relatively unaltered since the end of the Middle Ages. Only the sacristy is significantly later, added in 1790. New windows were also made in the 1860s.

The church is richly decorated with murals internally. They range in period from the 13th to the 17th century. In the apse, some Romanesque paintings survive, notably a depiction of Mary, while some have been covered with other paintings in the 17th century. The vaults in the nave are decorated with murals from the 14th century, and the walls of the nave furthermore decorated by the artist sometimes referred to as the Master of the Passion of Christ (15th century). Still other paintings, in the choir, probably date from the 16th century, while another set, again in the nave, is dated to 1633.

The baptismal font is from the 12th century, Romanesque in style and a work by the sculptor known by the notname Byzantios. The triumphal cross is made on Gotland and dates from the 13th century. Other furnishings date from the time after the Reformation.
