= Solberga Abbey =

Cistercian nunnery in Sweden

Coordinates: 57°38′0.70″N 18°17′55.50″E

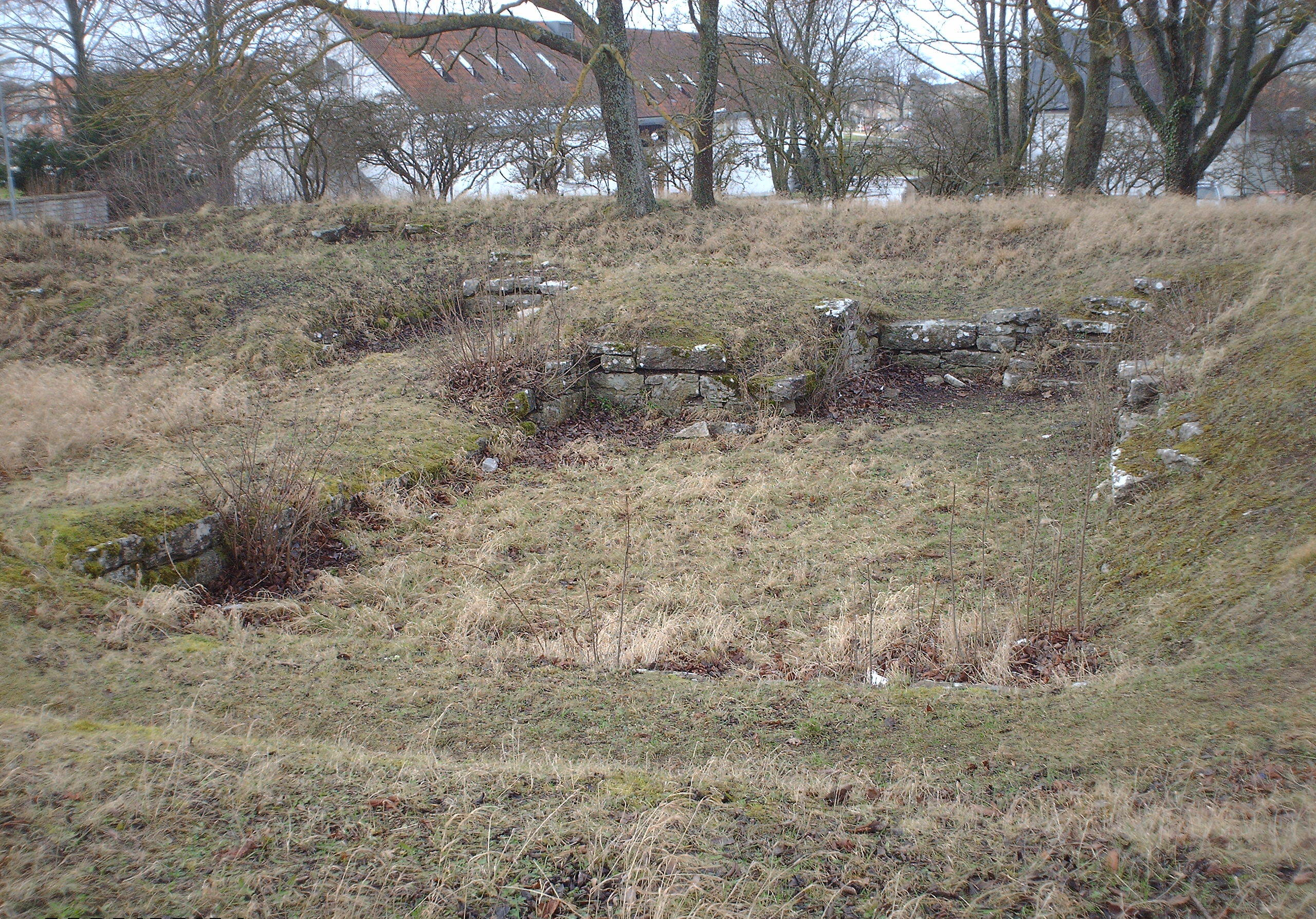
The ruins of what is thought to be the refectory of Solberga Abbey.

Solberga Abbey (Swedish: Solberga kloster), was a Cistercian nunnery in Sweden, in operation from 1246 until at least 1469. It was located outside Visby on Gotland until 1404, and then in Visby. It was the only nunnery on the island of Gotland.

== History ==
Solberga Abbey was likely a daughter convent of Vreta Abbey. On 12 August 1246, Bishop Laurentius of Linköping mentions that the first nuns had been sent to Gotland. This likely refers to Solberga, which was the only nunnery on the island. In contrast to what was previously believed, Solberga was a large convent with many members. It had both an abbess and a prioress. In 1361, many fallen from the Battle of Visby was buried on the abbey's land, where a cross, which still stands, was erected.

The abbey was presumably destroyed by the war between the Victual Brothers, the Teutonic Knights and the forces of the Kalmar Union in 1398–1403. In 1404, the abbess applied for help from the Master of the Teutonic Knights in Prussia, then in control of Gotland, to found a new abbey. The nuns were allowed to reside in the St. Jacob chapel in Visby. From 1469, they lived by the St. Gertrud chapel in Visby. During the 15th century, the nuns were still, event though no longer in residence at Solberga, referred to as the Solberga nuns. It is not known exactly when the nunnery was dissolved. It may not have lasted until the reformation. By 1469, the nuns were described as "the diminished nuns of Visby".

== Sources ==
- Thordeman, Bengt: Korsbetningen och Solberga kloster utanför Visby, 1930, ISBN 91-7192-513-9.
- Dick Wase, Kyrkorna i Visby, i Gotländskt arkiv 1990.
- Dick Wase, Kyrkorna i Visby - nya rön, i Gotländskt arkiv 2002.
