= Carl Gustaf Hellqvist =

Swedish painter (1851–1890)

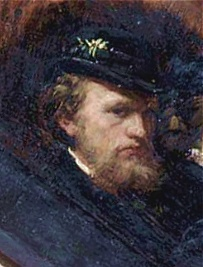
- Self portrait (detail of a larger painting), Nationalmuseum
- Born: 15 December 1851; Kungsör, Sweden
- Died: 19 November 1890 (aged 38); Munich, German Empire
- Known for: Painting

Carl Gustaf Hellqvist (15 December 1851 – 19 November 1890) was a Swedish painter. He was one of Sweden's most popular historical painters in the 19th century.

== Biography ==
He was born in Kungsör, between Arboga and Eskilstuna at Lake Mälaren, Sweden, where he grew up and went to school. In 1864 Hellqvist started to study art at the Swedish Royal Academy of Fine Arts in Stockholm, and in 1875 he was awarded the Royal Academy's highest prize for his painting " Gustav Vasa accuses Peder Sunnanväder and Mäster Knut in front of the chapter in Västerås" Swedish: Gustav Vasa anklagar Peder Sunnanväder och Mäster Knut inför domkapitlet i Västerås.

Two years later in 1877 Hellqvist was awarded a travelling scholarship from the Academy, and he travelled around the European continent. He moved together with his fiancée, to Munich in 1879.

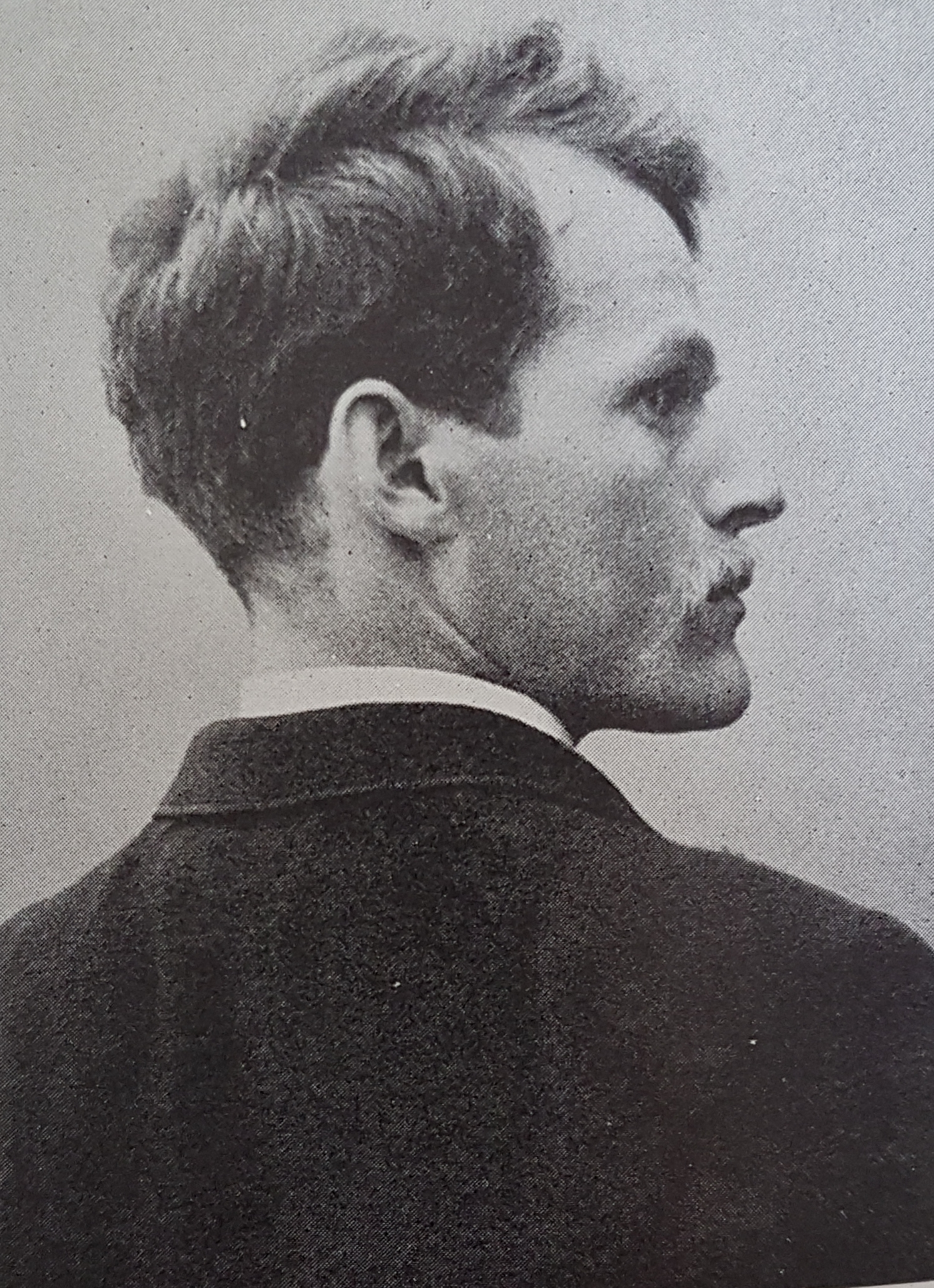
Photograph of Hellqvist

In 1882 he and Julie Karoline Friederike Thiersch (1859-1933) were married and left for Paris, where Hellqvist earlier had been present at the Paris Salon with his oil painting "The Death of Sten Sture the Younger on the Ice of Lake Mälaren" (Swedish: Sten Sture d y:s död på Mälarens is).

In August 1882 he was awarded the gold medal for his magnificent historical painting "Valdemar Atterdag Holding Visby to Ransom, 1361" (Swedish: Valdemar Atterdag brandskattar Visby) in Vienna, Austria.

In 1886 Hellqvist suffered from severe headaches which forced him to take a leave from his teaching at Königliche akademische Hochschule für die Bildenden Künste at Berlin. He ended his period of historical painting at the same time.

In 1889 Hellqvist received treatment for his disease and he was ordered on a diet.

In 1890 it was announced that Hellqvist's studio-objects were to be sold. Probably the most famous photograph of his studio was taken at the same time, which shows how a historical painter's studio looked like during the late 19th century.

From March 1889 he stayed in a mental hospital in Munich, and he died there on 19 November 1890 at the age of 38. He was buried in Munich.

== Works ==
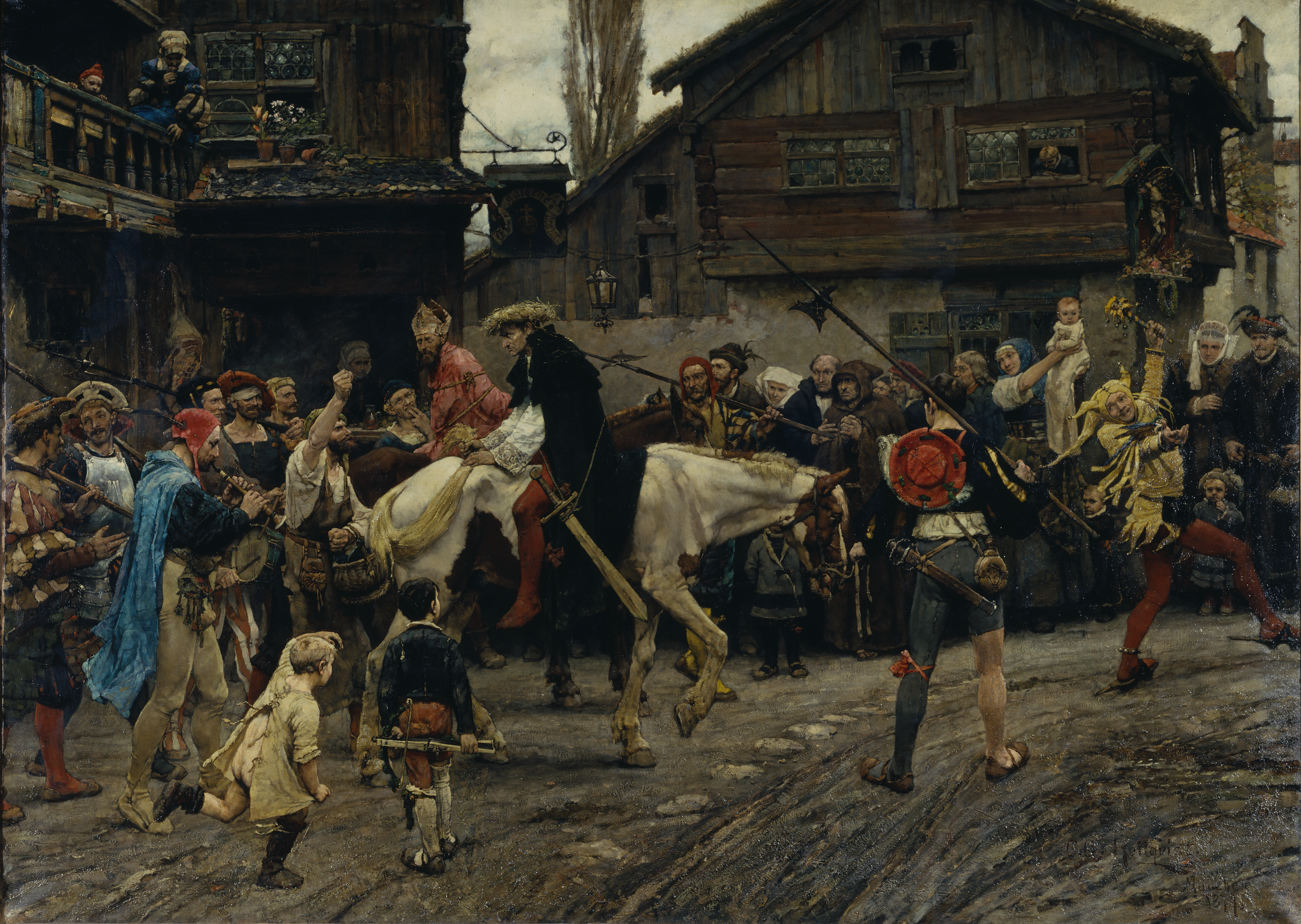
Peder Sunnanväder's and Mäster Knut's Ignominious Entry into Stockholm 1526, 1879

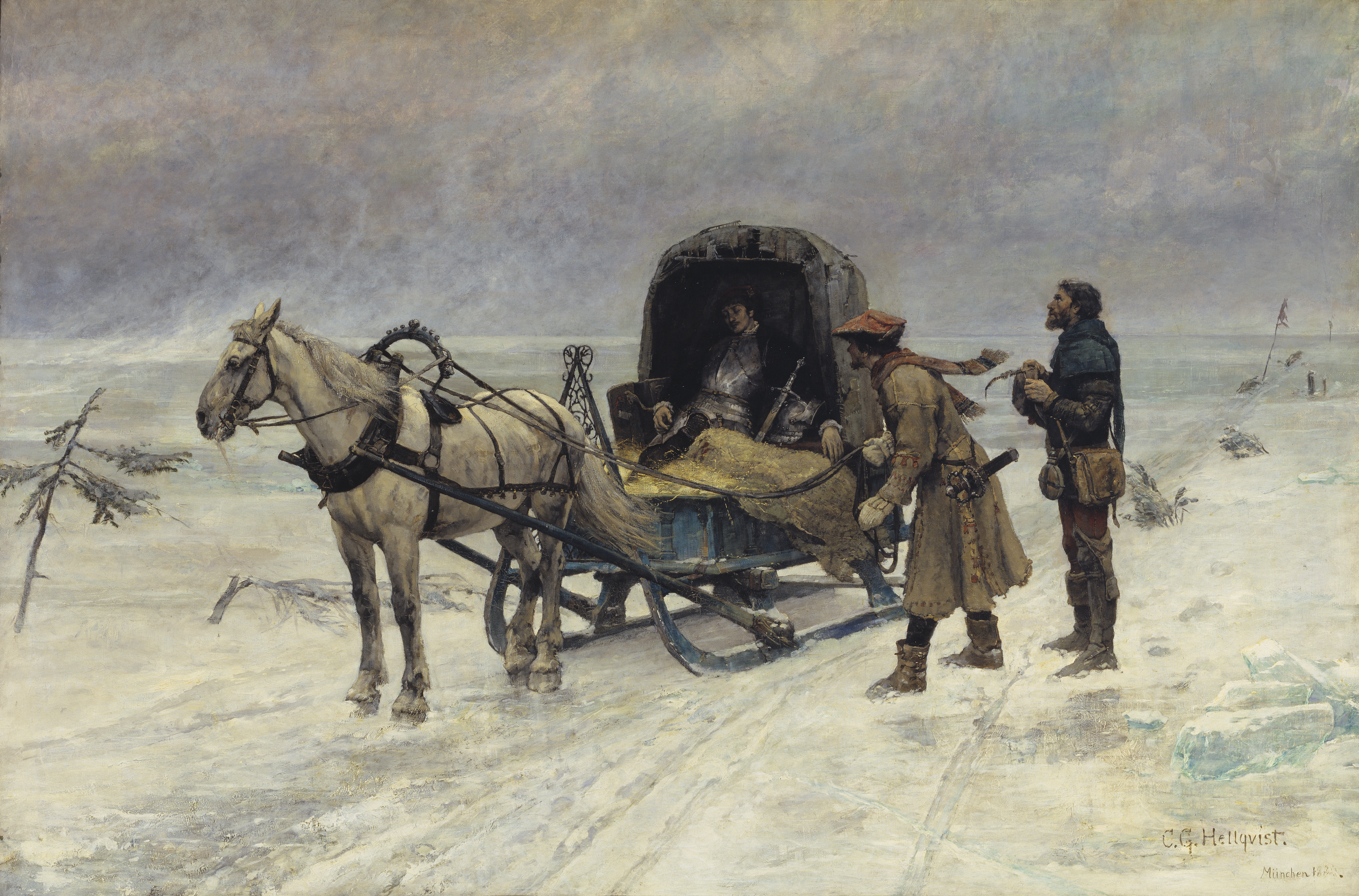
The Death of Sten Sture the Younger on the Ice of Lake Mälaren, 1880

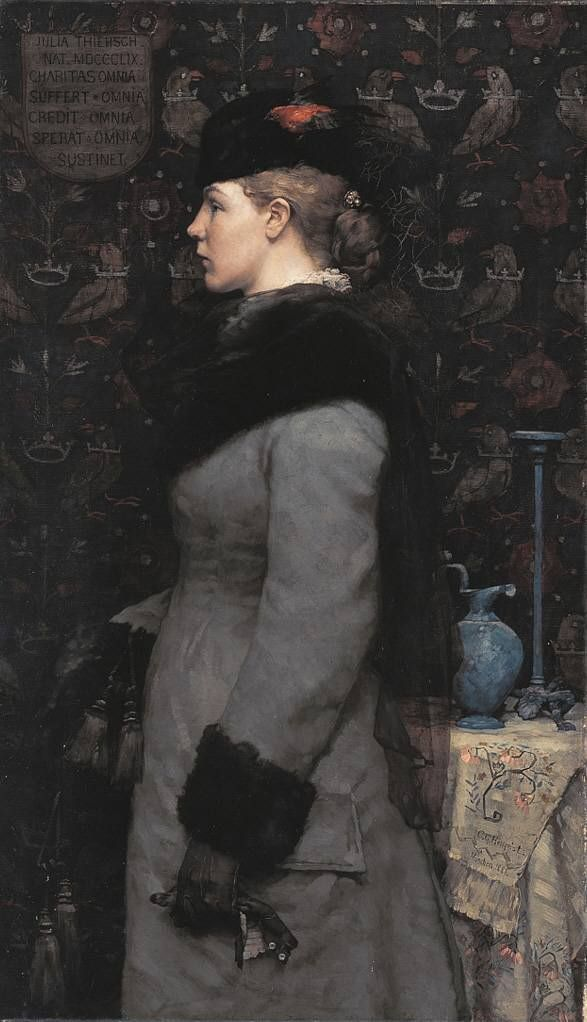
Portrait of Julia Thiersch, 1881

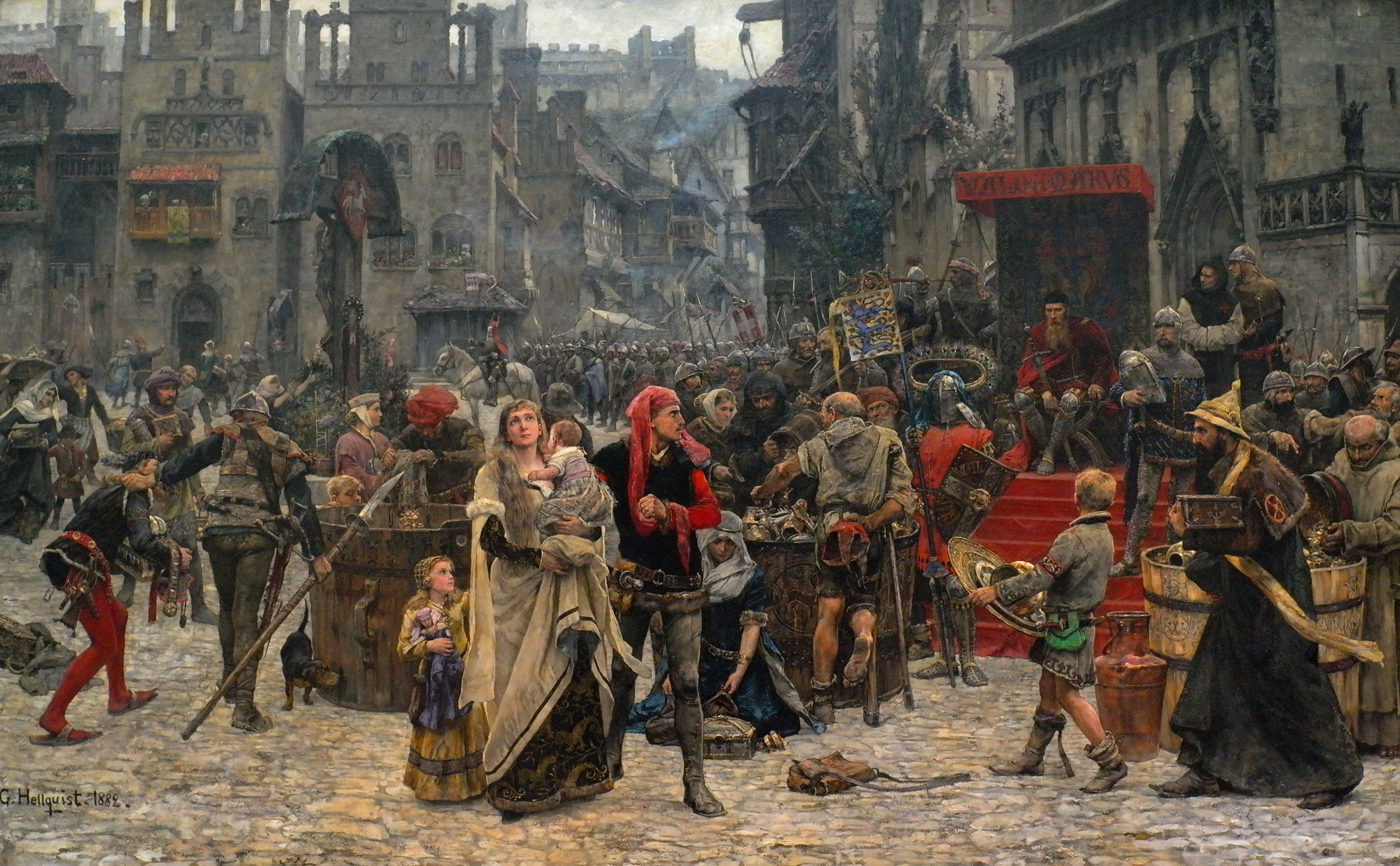
Valdemar Atterdag holding Visby to Ransom , 1882

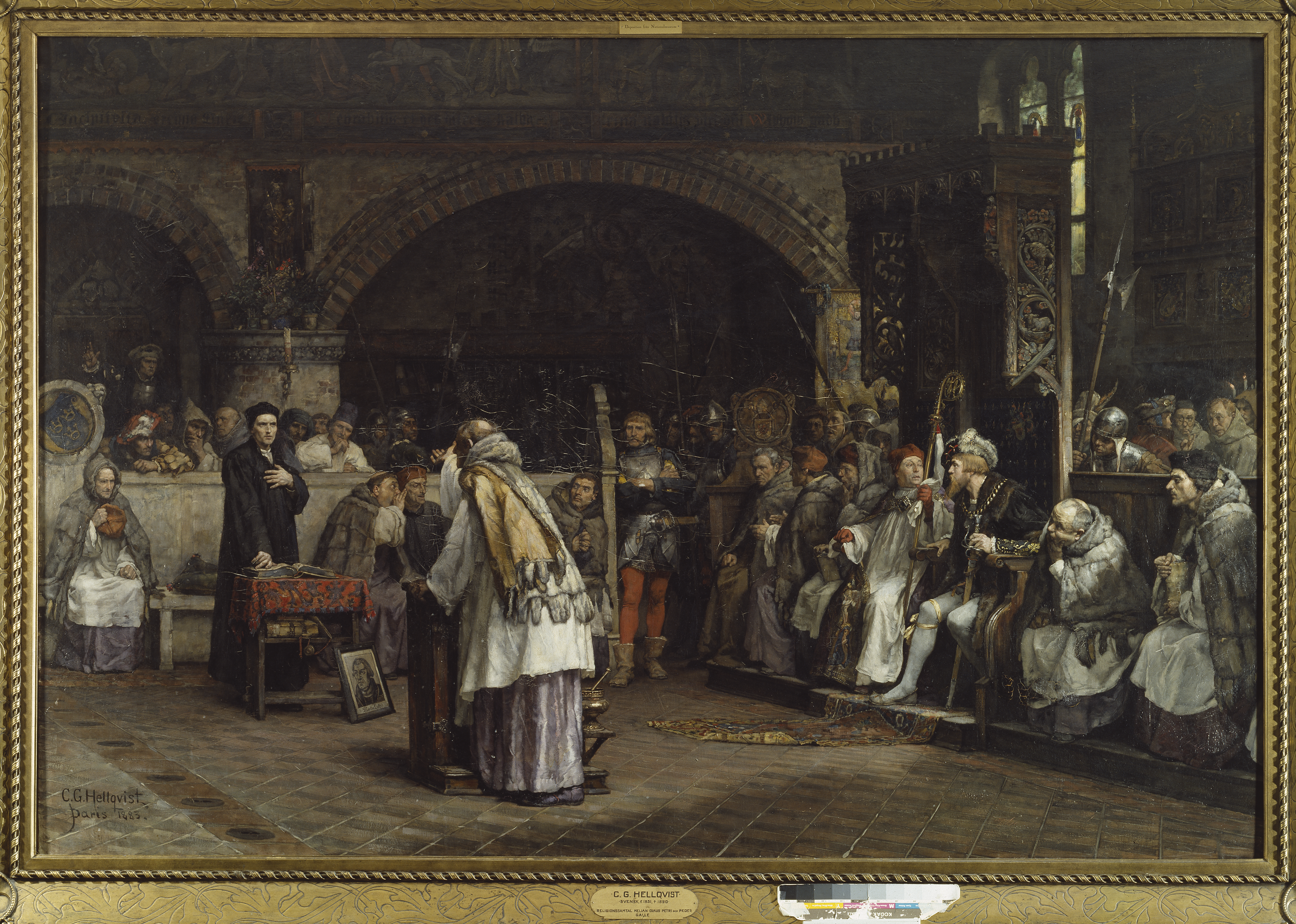
Religious Discourse between Olaus Petri and Peder Galle, 1883

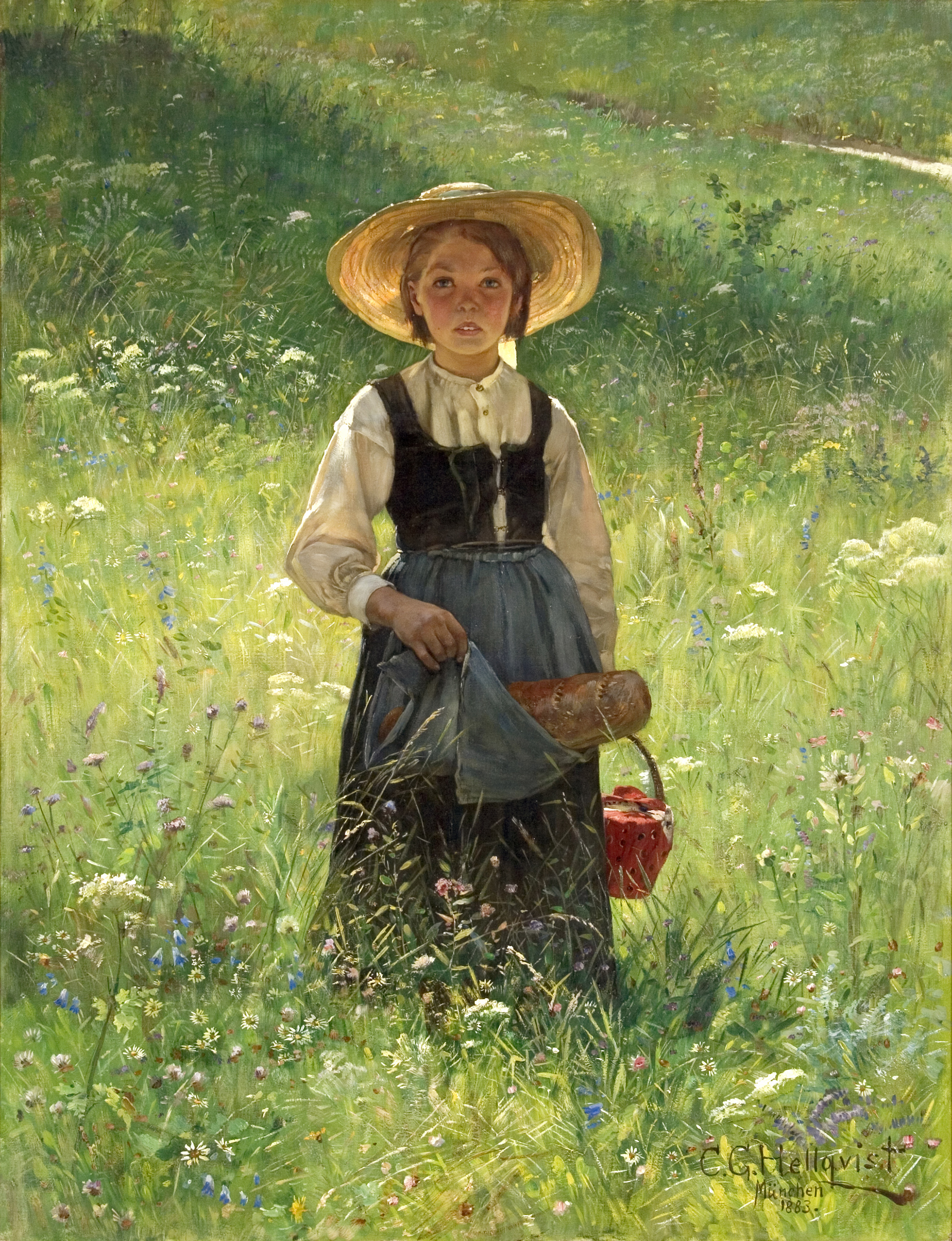
Girl in a Flowering Meadow, 1883

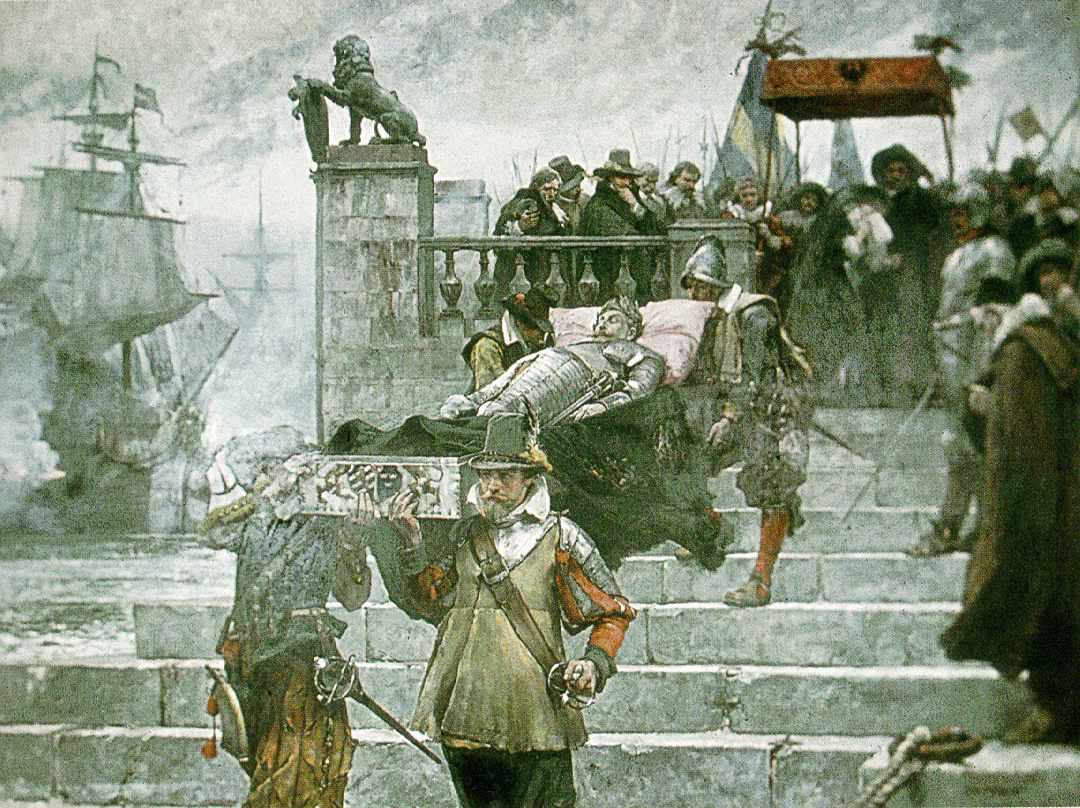
Embarkation of the body of Gustavus II Adolphus at the Port of Wolgast 1633, 1885

== Other sources ==
- Rudnert, Sune (1991) I historiemålarens verkstad: Carl Gustaf Hellqvist – liv och verk (Lund, Sweden : Lund University Press) ISBN 91-7966-162-9.
- Rudnert, Sune (1989) Carl Gustaf Hellqvist och hans historiemålning Valdemar Atterdag brandskattar Visby den 27 juli 1361 (Lund, Sweden : Lund University Press)
