= Gotland Brigade =

- Gotlandsbrigaden
- Active: 1949–2000
- Country: Sweden
- Allegiance: Swedish Armed Forces
- Branch: Swedish Army
- Type: Infantry (1949–1966); Armoured (1966–2000)
- Role: Infantry brigade (1949–1966); Armored Brigade (1966–1994); Mechanized brigade (1994–2000)
- Size: Brigade
- Part of: Gotland Infantry Regiment (1949–1963); Gotland Regiment (1963–1982); MKG (1982–1994); Milo M (1994–2000)
- Garrison/HQ: Visby
- Motto: Regementet för framtiden ("The regiment of the future")
- Colors: Blue and white
- March: "In Treue Fest" (Teike) (Note: The march was adopted in 1994.)

Insignia
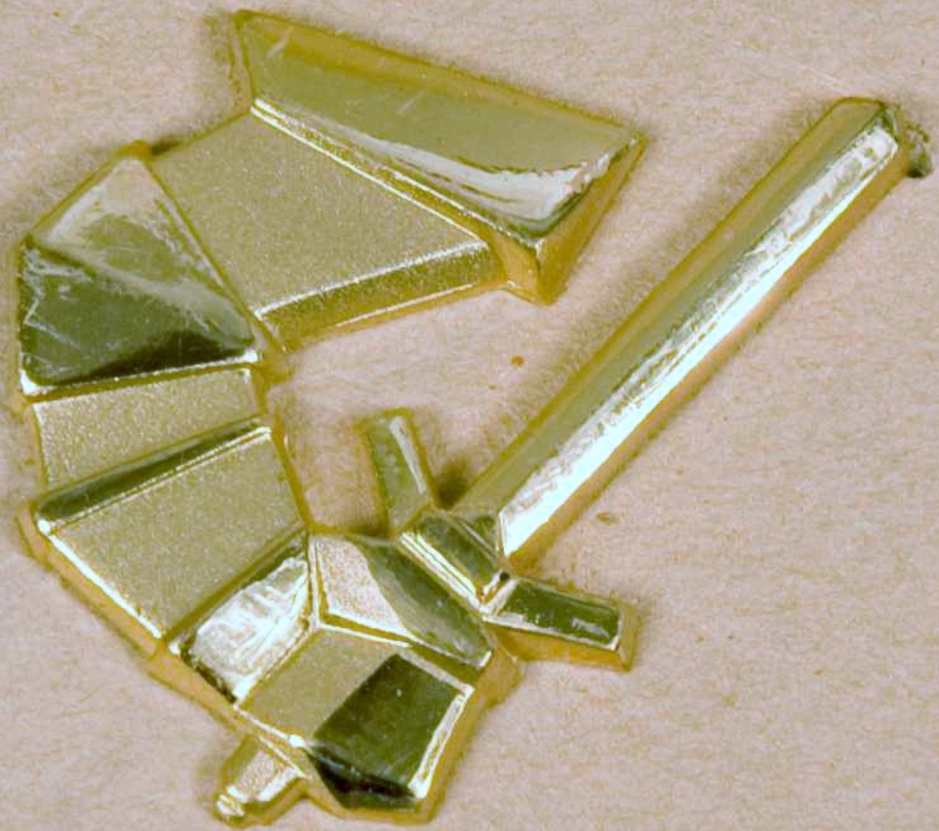
- Branch insignia

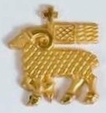
- Unit insignia

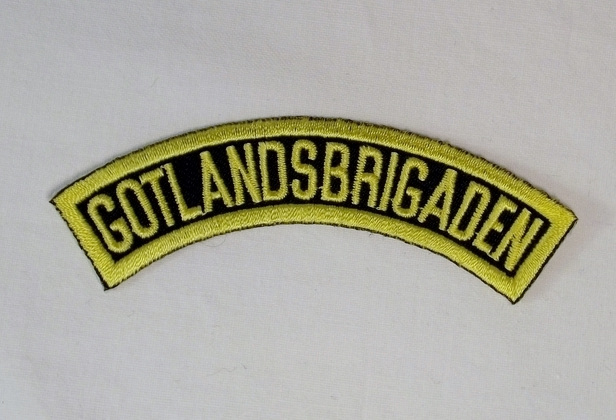
- Unit tab

Gotland Brigade (MekB 18) (Swedish: Gotlandsbrigaden), was a Swedish Army armoured brigade within the Swedish Armed Forces and acted in different forms between 1949 and 2000. The main parts of the basic training were held at the Gotland Regiment (P 18) within the Gotland Garrison in Visby, Gotland.

== History ==
The Gotland Brigade was raised as an infantry brigade during the years 1949–1951 under the name, Gotland Brigade (IB 18). This was organized through the Defence Act of 1948, where Gotland Infantry Regiment (I 18) was converted into a brigade.

In 1963, when the reorganization into the Pansarbrigad 63 ("Armoured Brigade 63) was commenced within the Swedish Army, it was decided that Göta Life Guards' (P 1) detachment, the Göta Armoured Life Guards' Company in Gotland (P 1 G), would be amalgamated with the Gotland Infantry Regiment (I 18). Through the amalgamation, Gotland Regiment (P 18) was formed and the Gotland Brigade was converted from an infantry brigade into an armoured brigade. The brigade became a model-type of the Armoured Brigade Gotland (Pansarbrigad Gotland, PB Gotland) in 1966, while the other active Swedish armoured brigades became a model-type of the Armoured Brigade 63 (Pansarbrigad 63, PB 63). The brigade also received its new designation, PB 18.

In 1982, the brigade together with the other units on Gotland was amalgamated into the Gotland Military Command (MKG). In 1994, the brigade was separated along with the regiment from the command and became a cadre-organized war unit in the Middle Military District (Milo M) from 1 July, under the new name Gotland Regiment and Gotland Brigade (MekB 18). In the same year the brigade was supplied with Pansarbandvagn 302 and Stridsvagn 104 from Kristianstad Brigade (Kristianstadsbrigaden, PB 26), which was disbanded as a result of the Defence Act of 1992.

The Gotland Regiment and Gotland Brigade (MekB 18) were disbanded as a result of the disarmament policies set forward in the Defence Act of 2000 and on 1 July 2000 it adopted the name, Gotland Regiment (P 18).

== Order of battle ==
The Gotland Brigade did not control any units during peacetime. All units assigned to it in war were trained and maintained by the Gotland Regiment and Gotland Artillery Regiment in Visby.

- PB 18 - Gotland Brigade (Gotlandsbrigaden) in Visby:
  - Brigade headquarters and headquarters company
  - 1st Armoured Battalion with a headquarters company, 12 × Stridsvagn 102R tanks in one company, 28 × KP-car m/42 wheeled armoured personnel carriers and 24 × rifle squads with 8 × Pvpj 1110 90 mm recoilless rifles in two companies, 4 × M/40 105 mm howitzers in an artillery battery and a logistics company
  - 2nd Armoured Battalion with a headquarters company, 12 × Stridsvagn 102R tanks in one company, 28 × KP-car m/42 wheeled armoured personnel carriers and 24 × rifle squads with 8 × Pvpj 1110 90 mm recoilless rifles in two companies, 4 × M/40 105 mm howitzers in an artillery battery and a logistics company
  - 3rd Armoured Battalion with a headquarters company, 12 × Stridsvagn 102R tanks in one company, 28 × KP-car m/42 wheeled armoured personnel carriers and 24 × rifle squads with 8 × Pvpj 1110 90 mm recoilless rifles in two companies, 4 × M/40 105 mm howitzers in an artillery battery and a logistics company
  - Artillery battalion with 12 × 155 mm Haubits m/F towed howitzers
  - 18th Armoured Reconnaissance Company with 6 × KP-car m/42 wheeled armoured personnel carriers, 12 × Jeeps, 12 × Recon Teams, 2 × rifle squads and 4 × Pvpj 1110 90 mm recoilless rifles
  - 18th Anti-tank Company with Carl Gustaf 8.4cm recoilless rifles and Bantam anti-tank missiles
  - 18th Engineer Company
  - Logistic battalion

== Heraldry and traditions ==
The Gotland Brigade shared heraldry and traditions with Gotland Regiment. In 1994–2000, the brigade managed the traditions of the regiment.

=== Coat of arms ===
The coat of the arms of the Gotland Regiment and Gotland Brigade (MekB 18) 1994–2000. It was also used by the Gotland Regiment (P 18) 1977–1994 and 2000–2004. Blazon: "Azure, a ram passant argent, armed or, banner gules with crosstaff, edging and five flaps or. The shield surmounted two arms in fess, embowed and vambraced, the hands holding swords in saltire, or".

== Commanding officers ==
Commanding officers:

- 1983-10-01 – 1988-09-30: COL Stig Barke
- 1988-10-01 – 1992-06-30: COL Anders Sifvertsson
- 1992-07-01 – 1994-12-31: LTC/COL Karlis Neretnieks
- 1995-01-01 – 1999-05-31: COL Sven-Olof "Olle" Broman
- 1999-06-01 – 2000-06-30: COL Peter Molin

== Names, designations and locations ==
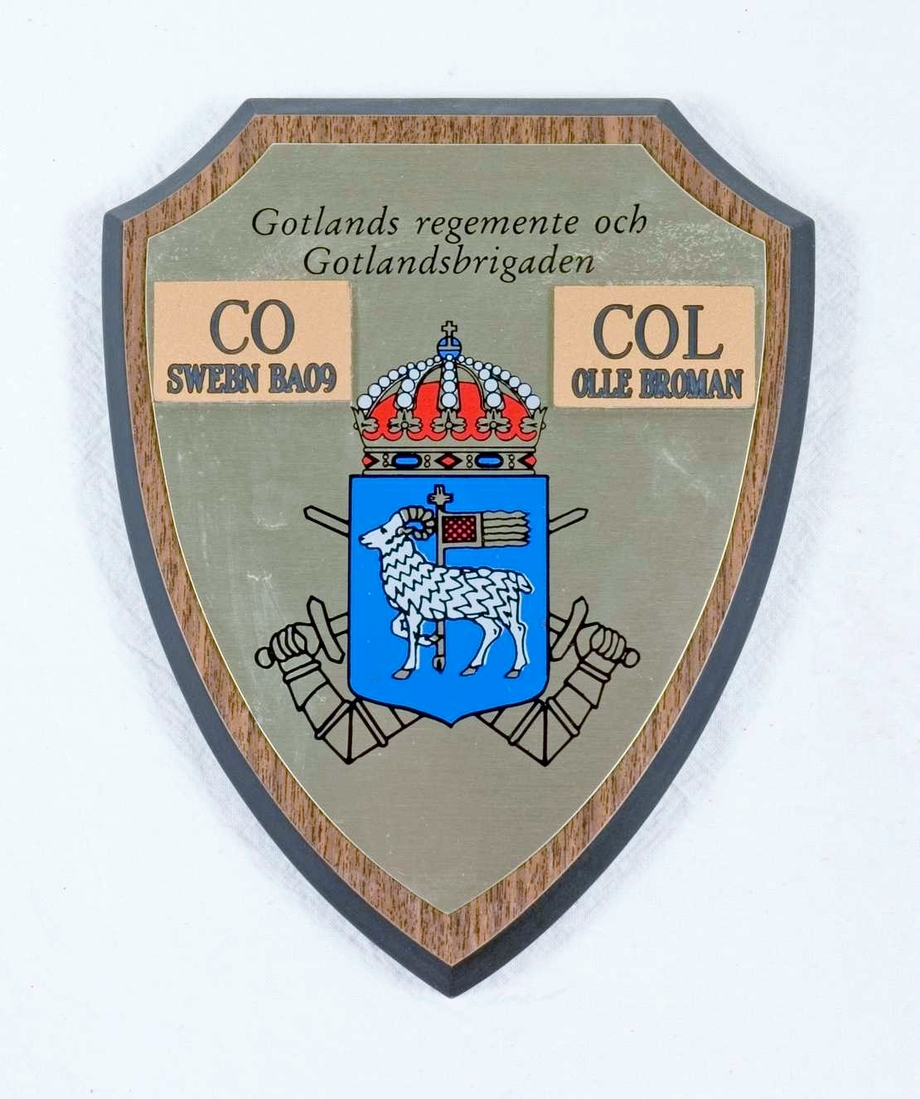
Escutcheon of Gotland Regiment and Gotland Brigade.

Name	Translation	From		To
Gotlandsbrigaden	Gotland Brigade	1949-10-01	–	1994-06-30
Gotlands regemente och Gotlandsbrigaden	Gotland Regiment and Gotland Brigade	1994-07-01	–	2000-06-30
Designation		From		To
IB 18		1949-10-01	–	1966-??-??
PB 18		1966-??-??	–	1994-06-30
MekB 18		1994-07-01	–	2000-06-30
Location		From		To
Visby Garrison		1949-10-01	–	2000-06-30

== See also ==
- Gotland Regiment
- Military on Gotland
- List of Swedish Army brigades
