= I27 =

I27 may refer to:

- Interstate 27, an Interstate Highway entirely in the U.S. state of Texas
- Japanese submarine I-27, a submarine of the Imperial Japanese Navy which saw service during the Pacific Campaign of World War II
- Gotland Infantry Regiment
