= Pehr Janse =

Swedish Army officer (1893–1961)

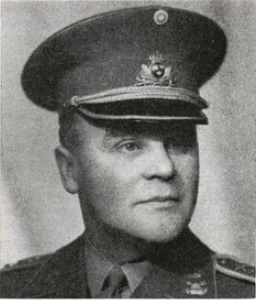
- Born: Pehr David Albert Janse; 31 January 1893; Lidingö, Sweden
- Died: 2 October 1961 (aged 68); Stockholm, Sweden
- Burial place: Lidingö Cemetery
- Military career
- Allegiance: Sweden
- Branch: Swedish Army
- Service years: 1913–1953
- Rank: Major general
- Commands: Gotland Infantry Regiment; Swedish Armoured Troops; IV Military District (acting)

Major General Pehr David Albert Janse (31 January 1893 – 2 October 1961) was a Swedish Army officer. Janse's senior commands include regimental commander of the Gotland Infantry Regiment, Inspector of the Swedish Armoured Troops and acting commanding officer of the IV Military District.

== Early life ==
Janse was born on 31 January 1893 in Lidingö, Sweden, the son of lieutenant colonel Albert Fredrik Daniel Janse and his wife Carolina Elisabeth (née Swartz).

== Career ==
Janse was commissioned as underlöjtnant in the Scanian Dragoon Regiment (Skånska dragonregementet, K 6) in 1913 and lieutenant in the Swedish Army in 1918, and in 1926, after completing the Royal Swedish Army Staff College and completing the post of aspirant, became captain of the General Staff. He transferred to the Life Regiment Dragoons (K 2) in 1921 and after that regiment's disbandment in 1928 to the Life Regiment of Horse (K 1), where in 1930 he was appointed ryttmästare. In 1935 he re-entered the General Staff as major and Chief of Staff of the Cavalry Inspectorate (Kavalleriinspektionen).

Two years later, he was appointed lieutenant lieutenant at the General Staff Corps and in 1938 he was lieutenant colonel in the Södermanland Regiment (I 10), where from 1939 he served as commander of the armored battalion. In 1941, Janse became regimental commander of Gotland Infantry Regiment (I 18), and took up the newly created position as Inspector of the Swedish Armoured Troops in 1942 and was appointed acting military commander of the IV Military District in 1945. Janse left the post in 1953 and retired from the military. The same year he took up a position as inspector at the Svenska BP AB.

Janse was from 1943 editor of the military-technical journal Pansar ("Armour") (from 1945 Pansar-Teknik-Underhåll, "Armour-Technology-Maintenance"). From 1947 he was chairman of the Föreningen för befrämjande av skolungdomens vapenövningar ("Association for the Promoting of the School Youth's Weapons Exercises").

== Personal life ==
In 1920, Janse married Ella Hedvig Marianne Holtermann (1895–1949), the daughter of Cabinet Chamberlain Oscar Holtermann and Countess Maud von Rosen. They had three children; (1920–2013), Maud (1923–2008) and Pehr (1931–1996).

In 1950, he married Countess Ewa Creutz (1913–1966), the daughter of Friherre Carl-Gustaf Creutz and Gertrud Mathilda Schröder.

== Death ==
Janse died on 2 October 1961 and was buried on 18 October 1961 at Lidingö Cemetery.

== Dates of rank ==
- 1913 – Underlöjtnant
- 1918 – Lieutenant
- 1926 – Captain
- 1930 – Ryttmästare
- 1935 – Major
- 1937 – Lieutenant colonel
- 1941 – Colonel
- 1948 – Major general

== Awards and decorations ==
- (Sweden) Commander of the Order of the Sword
- (Sweden) Knight of the Order of Vasa
- (Denmark) Knight of the Order of the Dannebrog
- Knight First Class of the Order of the White Rose of Finland

== Honors ==
- Member of the Royal Swedish Academy of War Sciences (1943)

Military offices
Preceded by None	Inspector of the Swedish Armoured Troops; 1942–1945	Succeeded by Gunnar Berggren
