= Gotland Regiment =

Coordinates: 57°36′48″N 18°16′57″E

- Gotlands regemente
- Active: 1963–1994, 2000–2004, 2018–
- Country: Sweden
- Allegiance: Swedish Armed Forces
- Branch: Swedish Army
- Type: Armoured
- Role: Mechanized infantry
- Size: Regiment
- Part of: Milo Ö (1963–1982); MKG (1982–1994); OPIL (2000–2005); Military Region Gotland (2018–)
- Garrison/HQ: Visby
- Mottos: Regementet för framtiden ("The regiment of the future")
- Colors: Blue and white
- March: "In Treue Fest" (Teike) (Note: Was adopted as the march of the Gotland Infantry Regiment (I 18) in 1909.)
- Mascot: Harald VII

Commanders
- Current commander: Colonel Andreas Gustafsson

Insignia
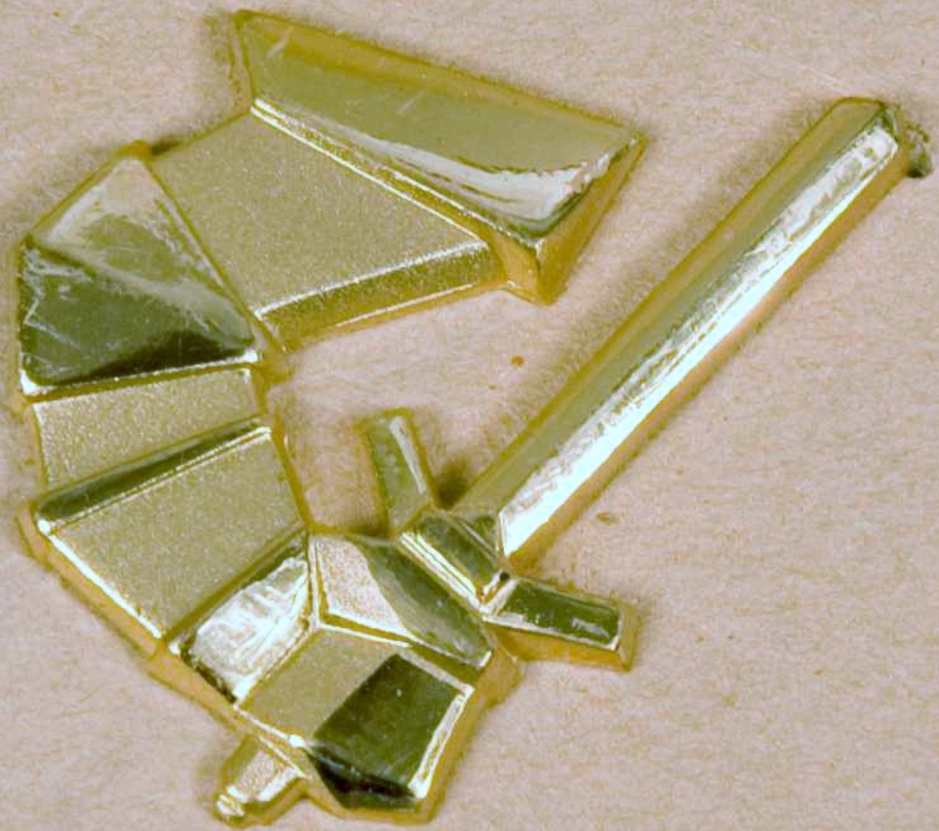
- Branch insignia

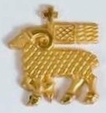
- Unit insignia

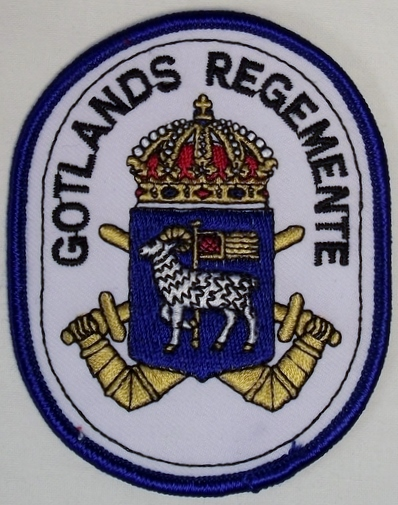
- Shoulder sleeve insignia

The Gotland Regiment (Swedish: Gotlands regemente, P 18) is a Swedish Army armoured regiment which has been active in various forms between 1963–1994 and 2000–2005, when it was disbanded. The regiment was re-established on 1 January 2018. The regiment is based in Visby as part of the Gotland Garrison.

== History ==
In the Defence Act of 1958, the Riksdag decided that eight armoured brigades with new combat vehicles would be organized in the army. The decision was changed for economic reasons in August 1960 to include only seven armoured brigades. Four infantry regiments, the North Scanian Infantry Regiment (I 6), South Scanian Infantry Regiment (I 7), Södermanland Regiment (I 10) and Gotland Infantry Regiment (I 18), were transferred from the infantry to the armoured forces. There was a detachment of the Göta Armoured Life Guards (P 1) on Gotland since 1944, the Göta Armoured Life Guards' Company in Gotland (P 1 G). The detachment was amalgamated on 1 April 1963 with the new Gotland Regiment, forming the backbone of the new armoured regiment. The Gotland Regiment was also given the new designation P 18 instead of its previous designation I 18 as an infantry regiment.

After I 18 was amalgamated with P 1 G to P 18 in 1963, the armored brigade thus became reorganized into five large battalions with KP-bil (instead of bicycles) with each two companies of either tank destroyers or Stridsvagn 74. During the 1970s, the brigade was re-armored with Stridsvagn 102, which, like the KP-bil, underwent a renovation in the 1980s.

As part of the so-called OLLI reform, which was carried out by the Swedish Armed Forces in 1973 and in 1975, A units and B units were created. The A units were regiments responsible for a defence district and the B units were training regiments. In Gotland's case, the VII Military District was reorganized into Gotland Military Command (MKG) in 1966. The military command was a special command and control organization within the Eastern Military District, but did not have the overall responsibility for the administration of the island. The Gotland Regiment, which was included in the Gotland Military Command (MKG), was a B unit (training regiment) from 1 July 1974.

Prior to the Defence Act of 1977, the Swedish Armed Forces Peace Organization Investigation (Försvarets fredsorganisationsutredning, FFU) proposed to the Riksdag that the Gotland Regiment (P 18), Gotland Artillery Regiment (A 7) and Gotland Anti-Aircraft Battalion (Lv 2) would be merged into one army regiment. However, the Committee on Defence and the Minister for Defence felt that no decision would be taken before the issue of further land acquisition in connection to Visborgs slätt had been resolved. In the autumn of 1980, the issue was considered sufficiently resolved when the Riksdag decided on 16 October 1980 to merge the army units into an army regiment. From 1 July 1982 the regiment was subordinate to the commanding officer of the Gotland Military Command (MKG). After the Defence Act of 1992, the Gotland Military Command received a new role. The command came only to lead all operations on Gotland, which on the mainland were settled by the defence district staffs, division staffs and naval command staffs. The army units, which since 1982 had been subordinate to the command, came to form independent units. However, the Gotland Regiment was merged with the war unit Gotland Brigade and formed the Gotland Regiment and Gotland Brigade (MekB 18). Prior to the Defence Act of 2000, the government proposed to the Riksdag that only six units for training of army brigade commands and mechanized battalions would be the starting point for the future of the Swedish Armed Forces. When it came to Gotland, the government considered that operational requirements made it necessary to have a military presence on the island. Primarily because of cost and maintenance reasons, the government considered that no tank training would be carried out on Gotland. The Swedish Armed Forces' new peacetime organization did not come to reflect the war organization in the same way as before, which meant that Gotland Regiment and Gotland Brigade was decommissioned on 30 June 2000, and in its place the Gotland Regiment (P 18) was re-formed on 1 July 2000.

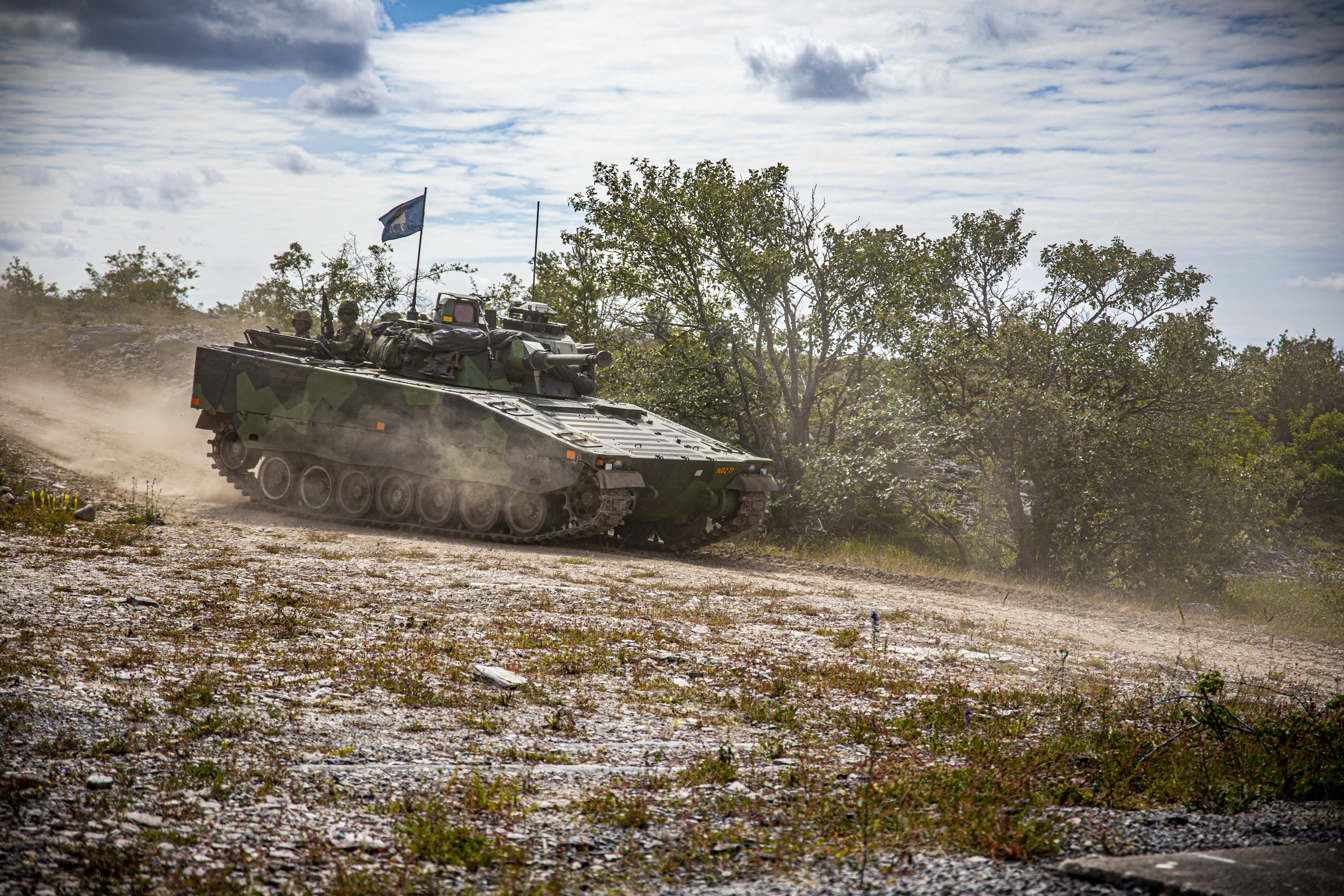
A Gotland Regiment CV90 Infantry Fighting Vehicle during a training exercise in 2024

In the Defence Act of 2004, the Riksdag decided on disbanding the Gotland Regiment (P 18). Prior to the Defence Act, the regiment was put up against the Jämtland Ranger Regiment (I 5), South Scanian Regiment (P 7) and Södermanland Regiment (P 10), where the government was keen to create rational production conditions, and a sustainable organizational structure. The new organization would respond to the requirements of the new structure of operational units and the development and training resources. Each regiment trained mechanized units, and had good production conditions and good engineering resources. The government wanted the Swedish Armed Forces to be developed into an operational defense, with a greater emphasis on internationalization, which came to mean that the government proposed disbanding the Gotland Regiment. Of the other three regiments, only the South Scanian Regiment remained, the other two also being disbanded. The government considered the South Scanian Regiment had the best geographic location, with proximity to the training area, which was central to the Swedish Armed Forces. The government also regarded it as important to have military units with emphasis on ground warfare in southern Sweden, with short distances to both the Øresund Bridge and Barsebäck Nuclear Power Plant. The Gotland Regiment was disbanded on 31 December 2004. From 1 January 2005, the regiment changed name to the Decommissioning Organization P 18 (Avvecklingsorganisation P 18), which would account for the disbandment of the regiment, which would be completed on 31 August 2006. On 28 May 2005 the official disbandment of the regiment took place.

In September 2017, the Minister for Defense presented the proposal that the regiment would be re-formed on 1 January 2018. The Riksdag confirmed the decision on 13 December 2017. On 22 May 2018, the regiment was officially consecrated by King Carl XVI Gustaf, Prime Minister Stefan Löfven and General Micael Bydén. The regiment is expected to be staffed by 30 men and women by the end of 2018 and will reach its full strength of 350 by 2020.

== Campaigns ==
- Formed the Swedish Battalion of KFOR in Kosovo January to June 2004.

== Units ==
=== Gotland Brigade ===
The Gotland Infantry Regiment came through the Defence Act of 1942 to organize a field regiment that was reorganized into an infantry brigade through the Defence Act of 1948. Together with Värmland Regiment (I 2) and Norrbotten Regiment (I 19), the regiment was one of the three infantry regiments that did not raise a so-called dubbleringsregemente, or field regiment. Through the Defence Act of 1948 brigades were introduced throughout the army, which resulted in the army being streamlined into two brigade types, infantry brigades and armored brigades, where Gotland Infantry Regiment was responsible for the Gotland Brigade (IB 18). The Gotland Brigade (IB 18) was raised in 1949 when the field regiment Gotland Infantry Regiment (I 18) was reorganized into a brigade and became the regiment's only brigade. In connection with the formation of Gotland Regiment in 1963 through the amalgamation of Gotland Infantry Regiment (I 18) and Göta Armoured Life Guards' Company in Gotland (P 1 G), the brigade was reorganized into an armored brigade and its designation was changed to PB 18. In 1994, Gotland Regiment was amalgamated into the Gotland Brigade (PB 18). In connection with this, the brigade was reorganized into a mechanized brigade, and made a name and designation change to Gotland Regiment and Gotland Brigade (MekB 18). With this reorganization, the brigade became a cadre-organized war unit within the Central Military District (Milo M). In connection with the Defence Act of 2000, the brigade was disbanded on 30 June 2000 and the regiment was re-established on 1 July 2000 under its former name, Gotland Regiment (P 18).

As of June 2025 the re-raised Gotland Regiment has a core establishment of up to 400 personnel. As part of the expanded Swedish military forces being raised it is planned that by 2027 the unit will be able to provide 4,000 trained conscripts as part of Task Force Gotland. At present (2025) the mechanised regiment consists of approximately 14 German Leopard tanks supported by Swedish CV90s and other armour.

=== Companies ===
2003–2005

- 1st – Life Company, officer and NCO training
- 2nd – Roma Company, five platoons including three mechanized platoons using Combat Vehicle 90, one missile platoon using Pansarvärnspjästerrängbil 1119 with a mounted BILL 1 Anti-tank guided weapon, and one support platoon using armored recovery vehicles, combat medics and forward command vehicles.
- 6th – Garde Company, staff and support company
- 8th – Havdhem Company, a battalion headquarters platoon, a battalion reconnaissance platoon, a battalion mortar platoon and a company support platoon.

2003

Organization until 2003:

- 1st – Life Company, officer and NCO training
- 2nd – Roma Company, mechanised infantry (1991–92 anti-tank missile company, 1992–93 brigade reconnaissance company)
- 3rd – Tingstäde Company, headquarters company, anti-tank missile company, staff and support (including battalion medical care). In the 1970s and early 1980s the company was an armored infantry company. From the mid 1980s to 1991, the company was a so-called military preparedness company
- 4th – Lärbro Company, tank company
- 5th – Klinte Company, depot and guard-duty
- 6th – Garde Company, staff and support
- 7th – Hemse Company, technical resource and mechanic school. Was organized in 2003, was renamed technical unit in 2003.
- 8th – Havdhem Company, command & control, formed 1 January 2001

== Locations and training areas ==
=== Barracks ===
On 30 August 1905, the regiment moved into a newly built barracks establishment at Visborgs slätt, which the regiment had as its military camp since 1887. The barracks establishment was built as part of the 1901 Army Order's building program according to the Swedish Fortification Corps type drawings for infantry establishments. In total, just over a hundred buildings were built in the area. The area has a number of times been expanded with garage and storage buildings and barracks. The Gotland Anti-Aircraft Corps and the Gotland Artillery Regiment were co-located with the Gotland Regiment, in 1978 and 1986 respectively. The staff of the Gotland Military Command and Gotland Military District have also been based in the barracks. After the regiment was disbanded, the Swedish Fortifications Agency sold the entire barracks area for about 40 million Swedish krona.

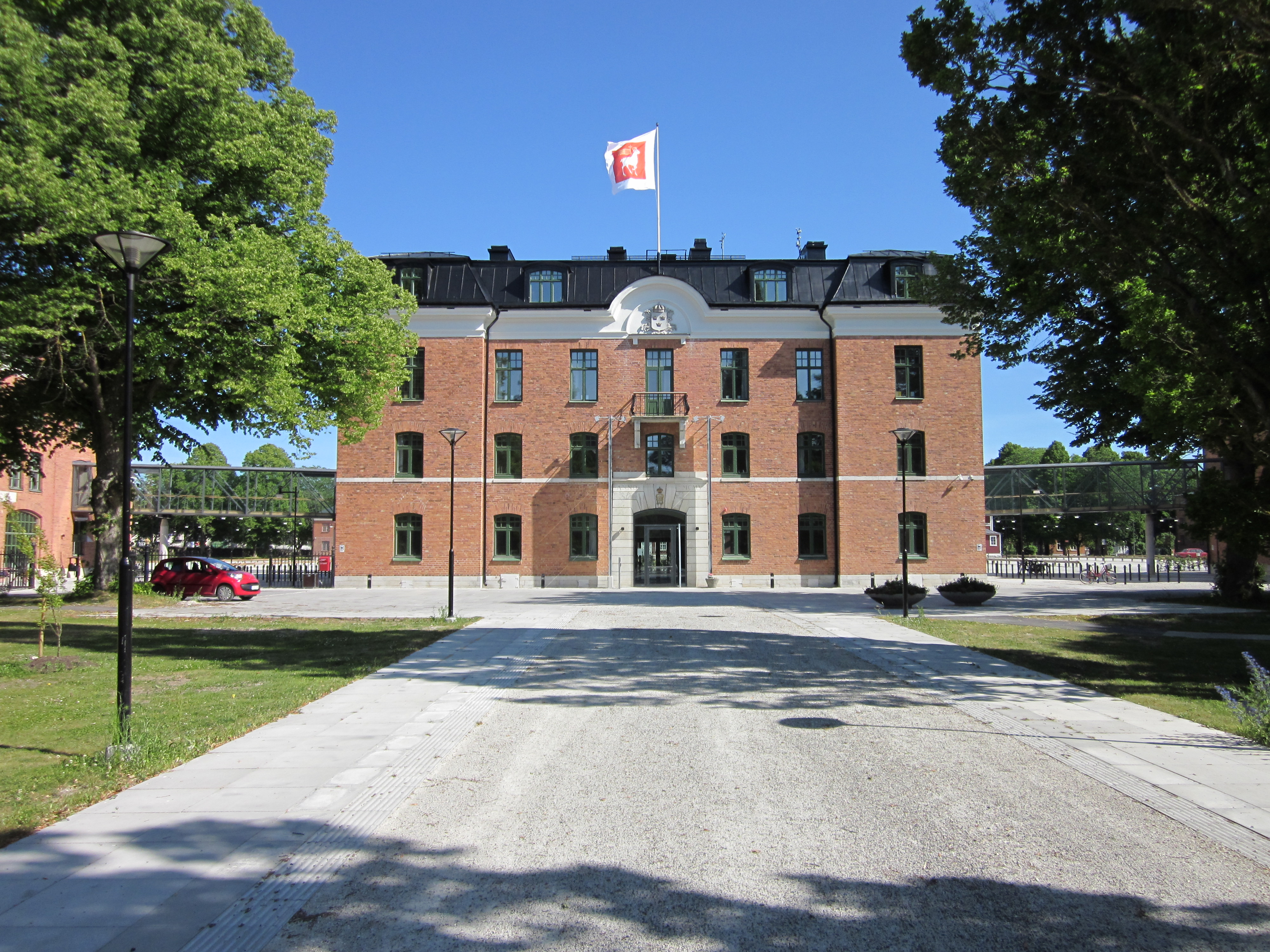
Chancery building

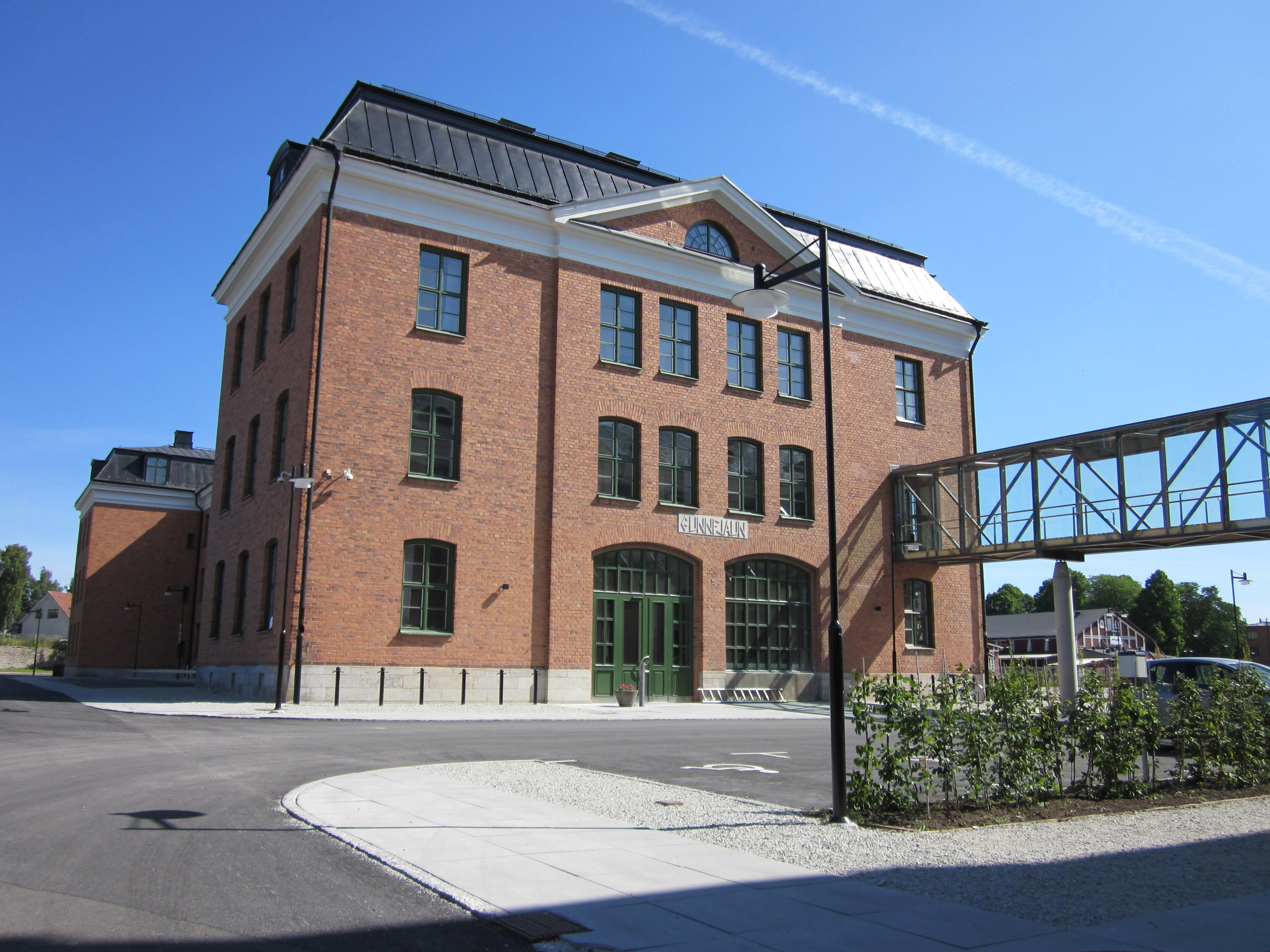
Barracks I (Gunnfjaun)

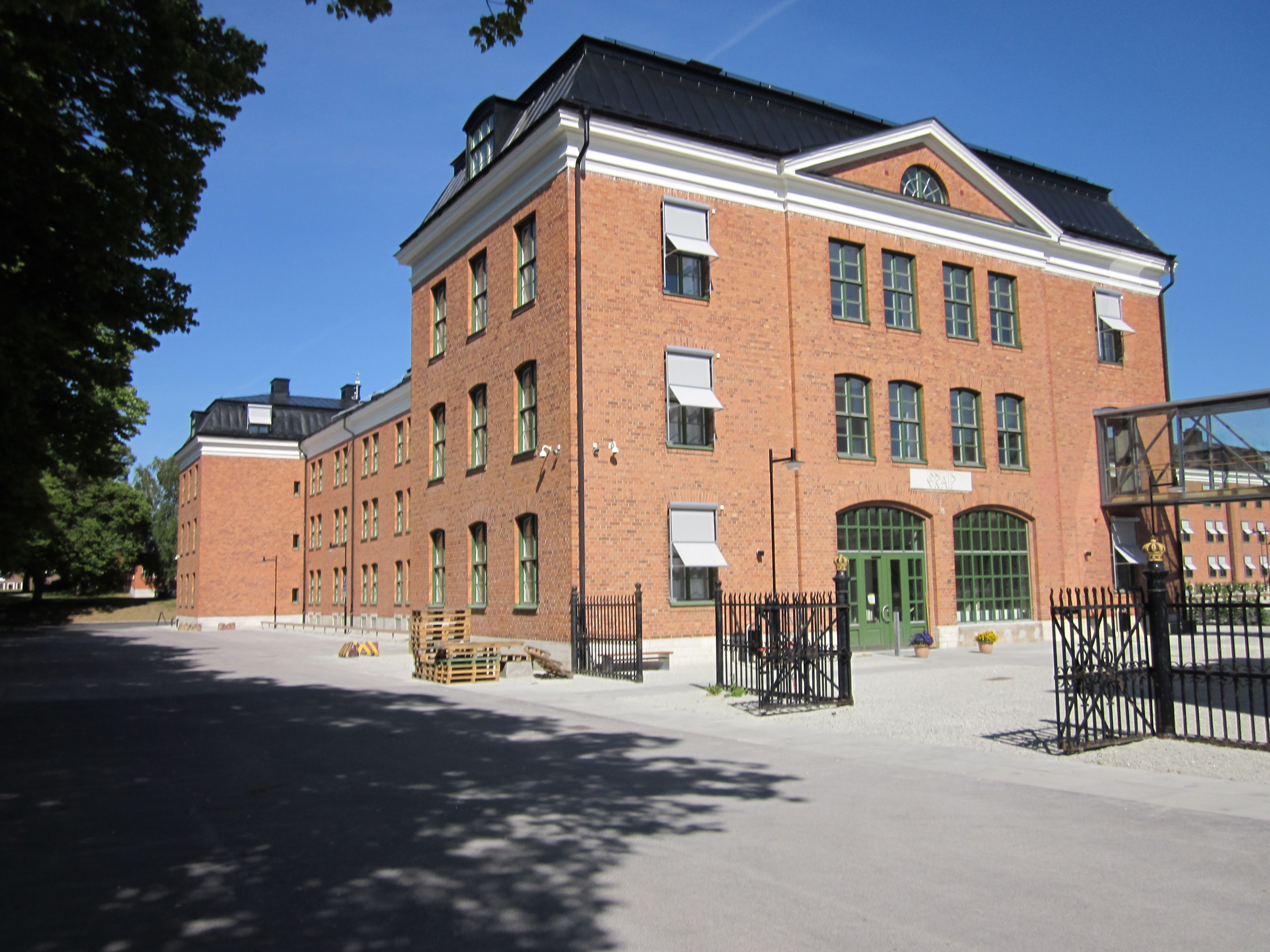
Barracks II (Graip)

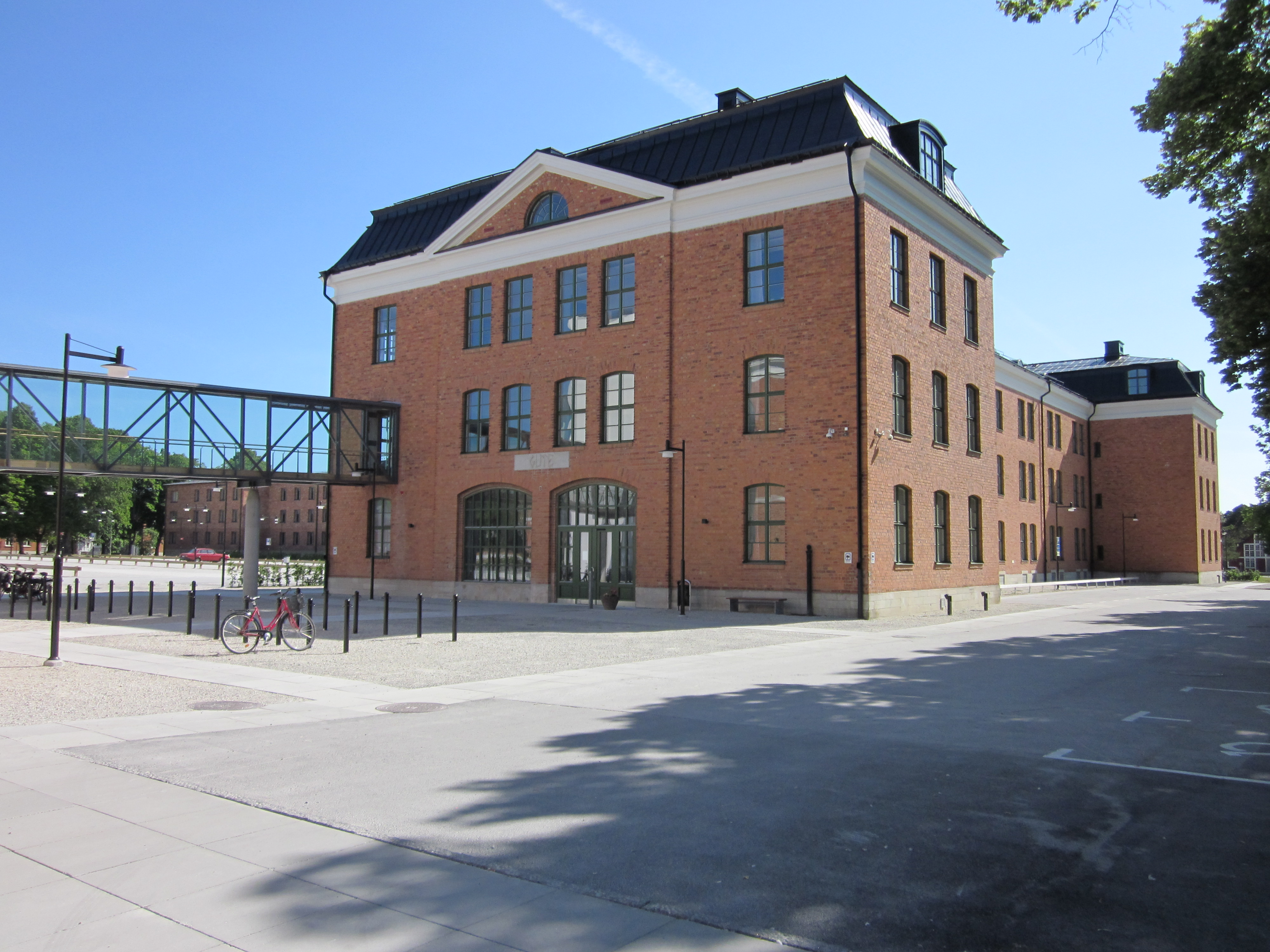
Barracks III (Gute)

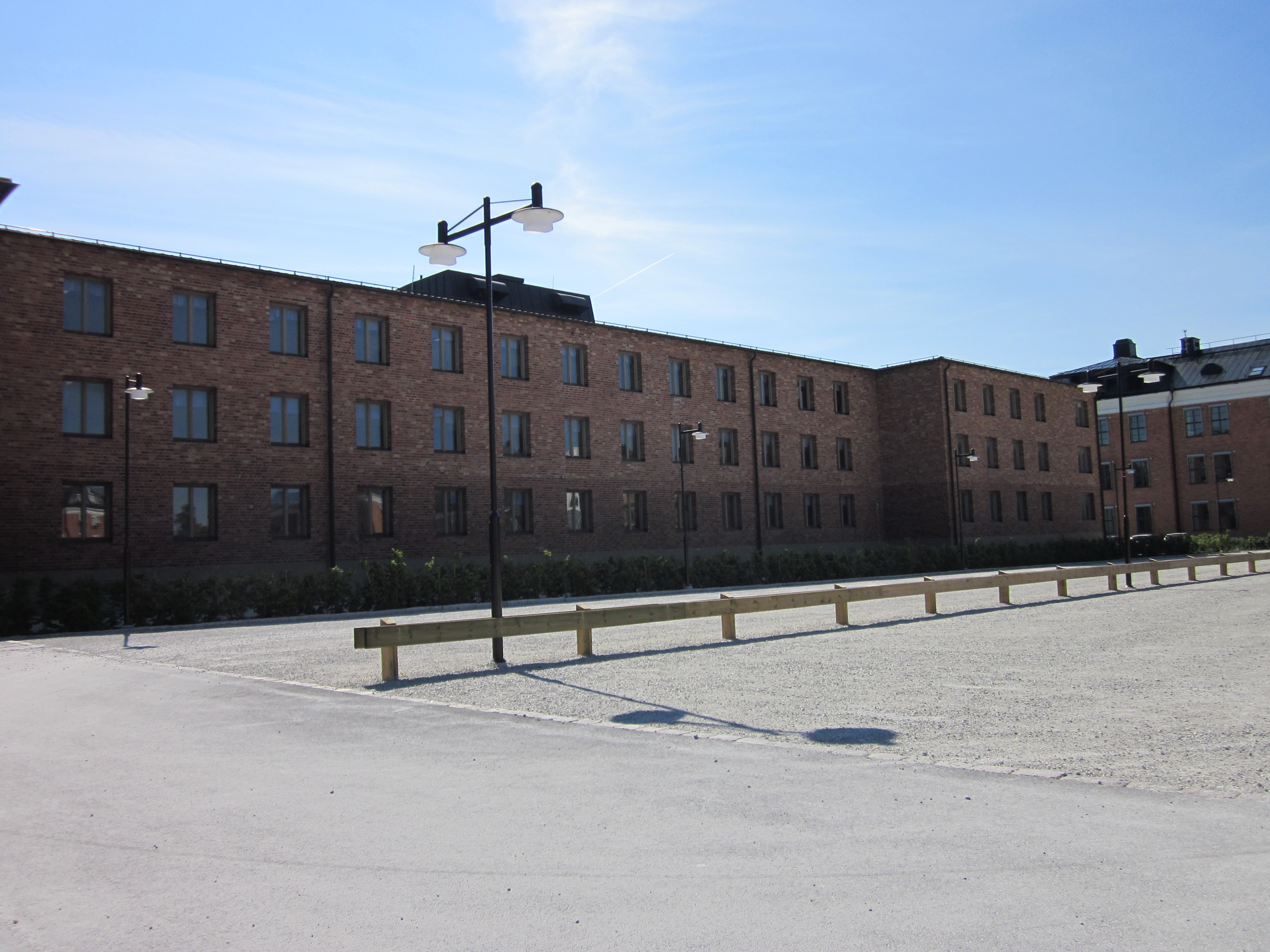
Barracks IV (Havde)

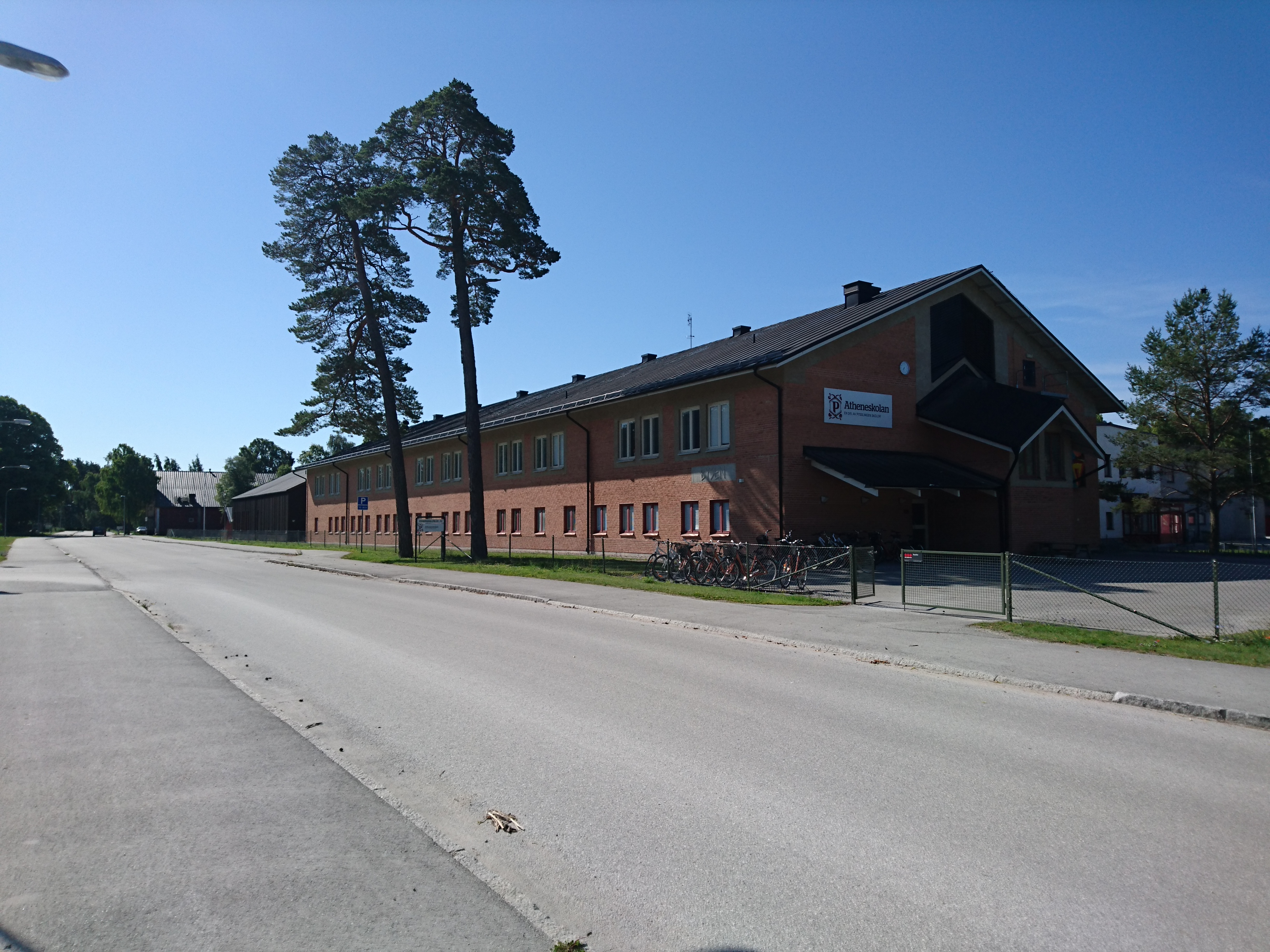
Barracks V (Bysen)

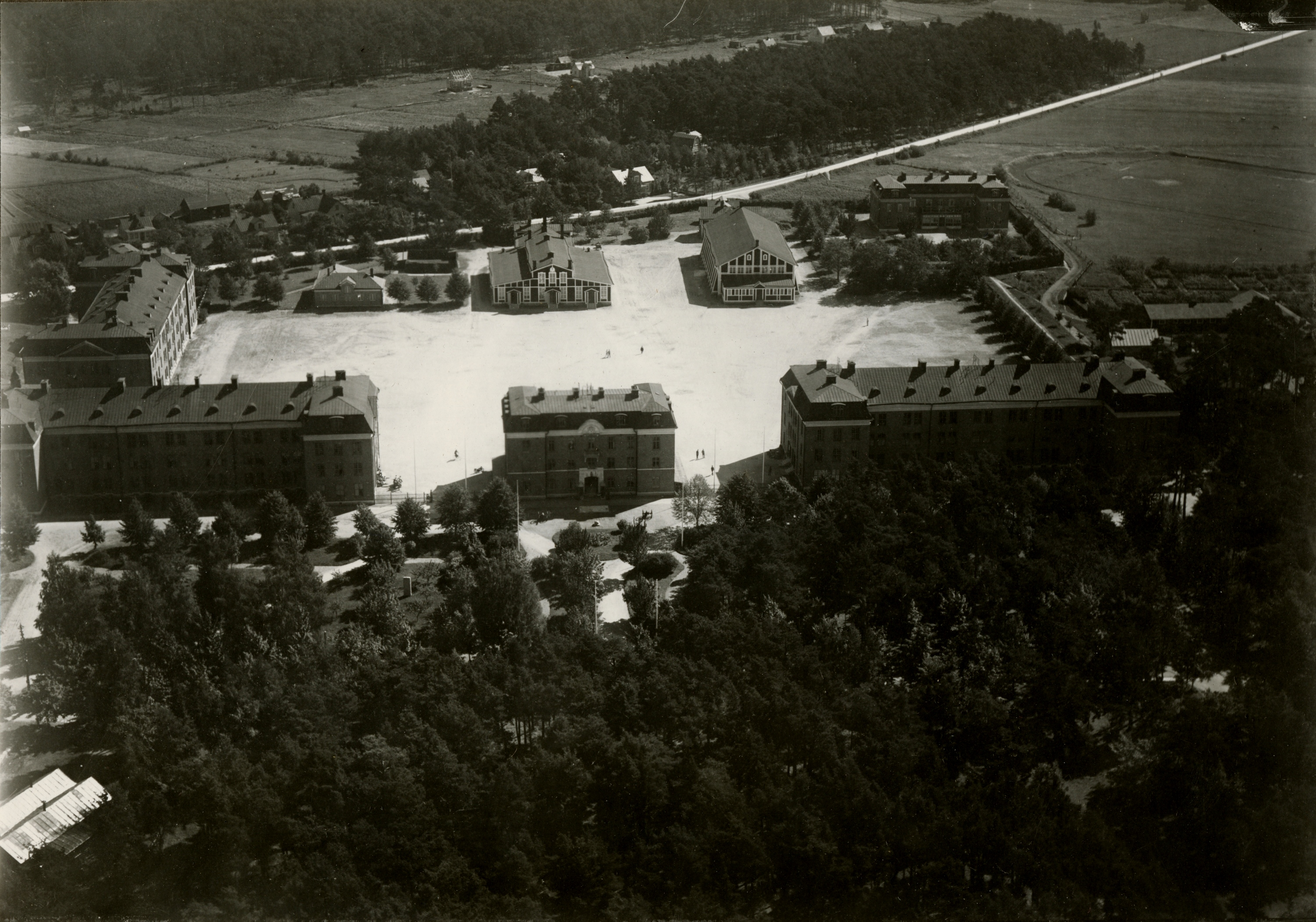
1930s aerial view

=== Training areas ===
The regiment's primary training areas were in Visby, Stånga malm, Blekväten, Vallstena, Hällarna and Tofta firing range.

== Heraldry and traditions ==
=== Colours, standards and guidons ===
When the regiment was reorganized into an armoured regiment in 1963, the regiment carried colours presented to the regiment on 13 June 1954 by the Chief of the Army Carl August Ehrensvärd. The regiment also for some time carried the colours of the Göta Armoured Life Guards' Company in Gotland (P 1 G) alongside their own colours. A new colour was presented to regiment at the Oscar Memorial Stone (Oscarsstenen) in Visby by His Majesty the King Carl XVI Gustaf on 12 October 2002. The colour was drawn by Kristina Åkerberg and embroidered by machine and hand in insertion technique by Maj-Britt Salander. Blazon: "On blue cloth the provincial badge of Gotland; a white ram passant, arms and crosstaff yellow and a red banner with edging and five flaps in yellow."

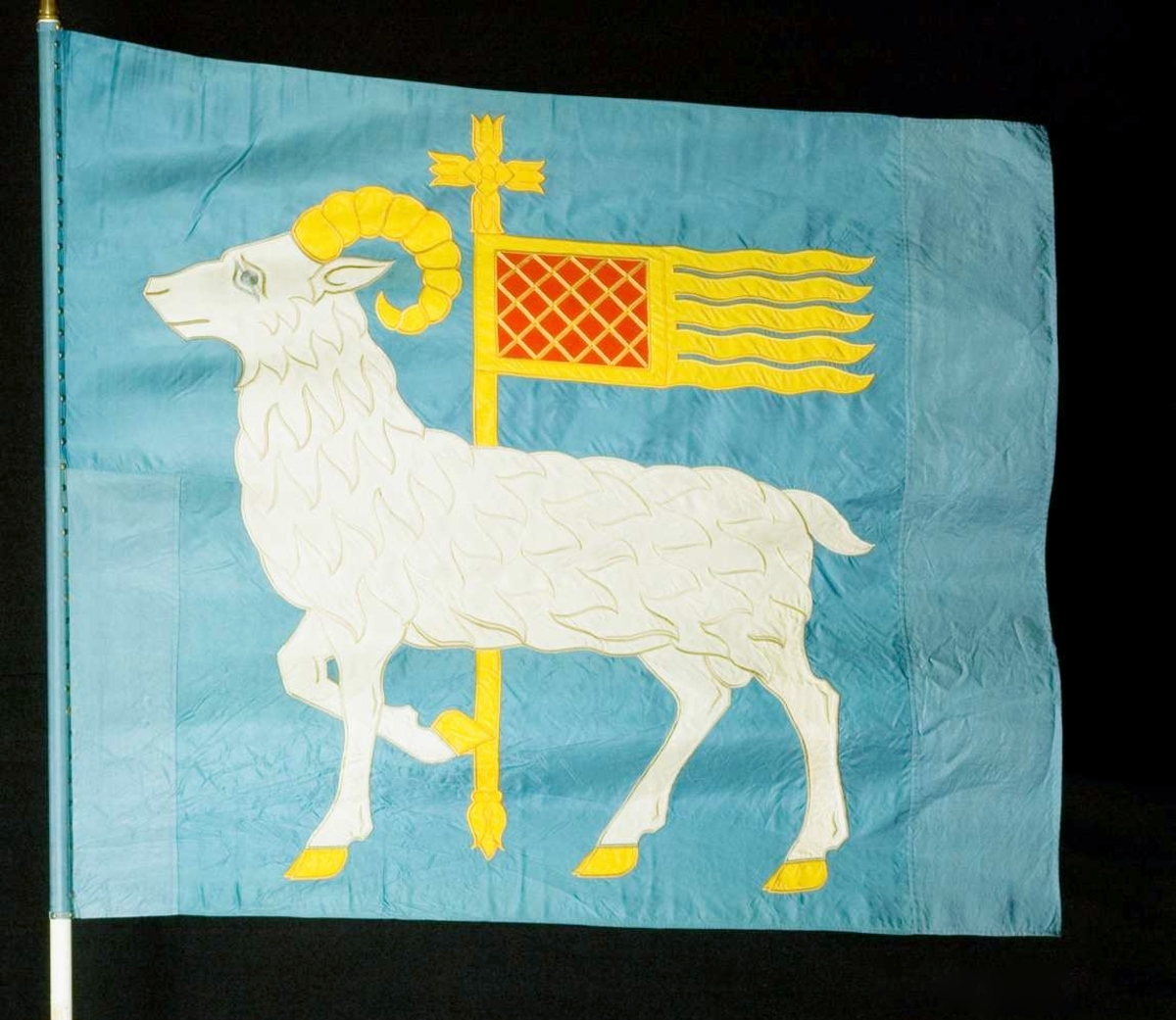
1954 regimental colour.

=== Coat of arms ===
The coat of the arms of the Gotland Regiment (P 18) 1977–1994, the Gotland Regiment and Gotland Brigade (MekB 18) 1994–2000 and the Gotland Regiment (P 18) 2000–2004. Blazon: "Azure, a ram passant argent, armed or, banner gules with crosstaff, edging and five flaps or. The shield surmounted two arms in fess, embowed and vambraced, the hands holding swords in saltire, or".

=== Medals ===
In 1991, the Gotlands regementes (P 18) hedersmedalj ("Gotland Regiment (P 18) Medal of Honour") in gold and silver (GotregGM/SM) of the 8th size was established. The medal ribbon is of blue moiré with a narrow white stripe on each side and a narrow red stripe on the middle.

When the regiment was disbanded in 2005, the Gotlands regementes (P 18) minnesmedalj ("Gotland Regiment (P 18) Commemorative Medal") in silver (GotregMSM) of the 8th size was established. The medal ribbon is blue with a red stripe followed on the inside by a white stripe on both sides. A silver ram is attached to the ribbon.

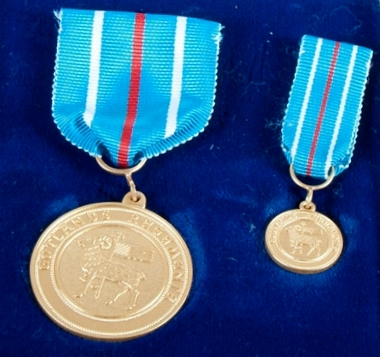
Gotland Regiment (P 18) Medal of Honour in gold

Ribbon bar of the Gotland Regiment (P 18) Medal of Honour

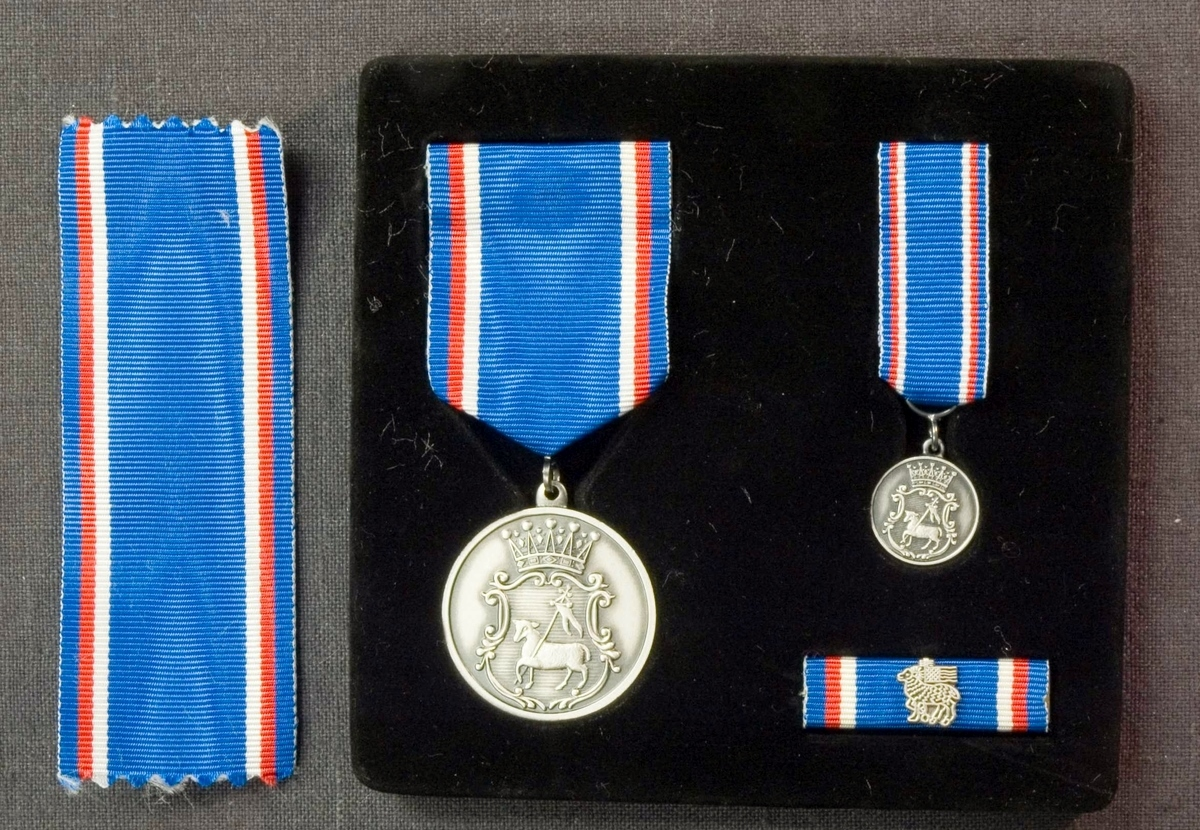
Gotland Regiment (P 18) Commemorative Medal in silver

Ribbon bar of the Gotland Regiment (P 18) Commemorative Medal

=== Other ===
In 1975 the prefix "Royal" was removed from all regiments according to a parliamentary decision and the name was now only Gotland Regiment (P 18). In 1978, the regiment organized the World Military Shooting Championship. In 1979, Corporal Harald I (a Gute sheep) did his first appearance in service during the Changing of the Royal Guards at the Stockholm Palace. He was later appointed honorary corporal. Harald V died in September 2019 and was replaced with Harald VI in October of the same year. On 5 February 2026, Harald VI retired as regimental mascot and was succeeded by Harald VII.

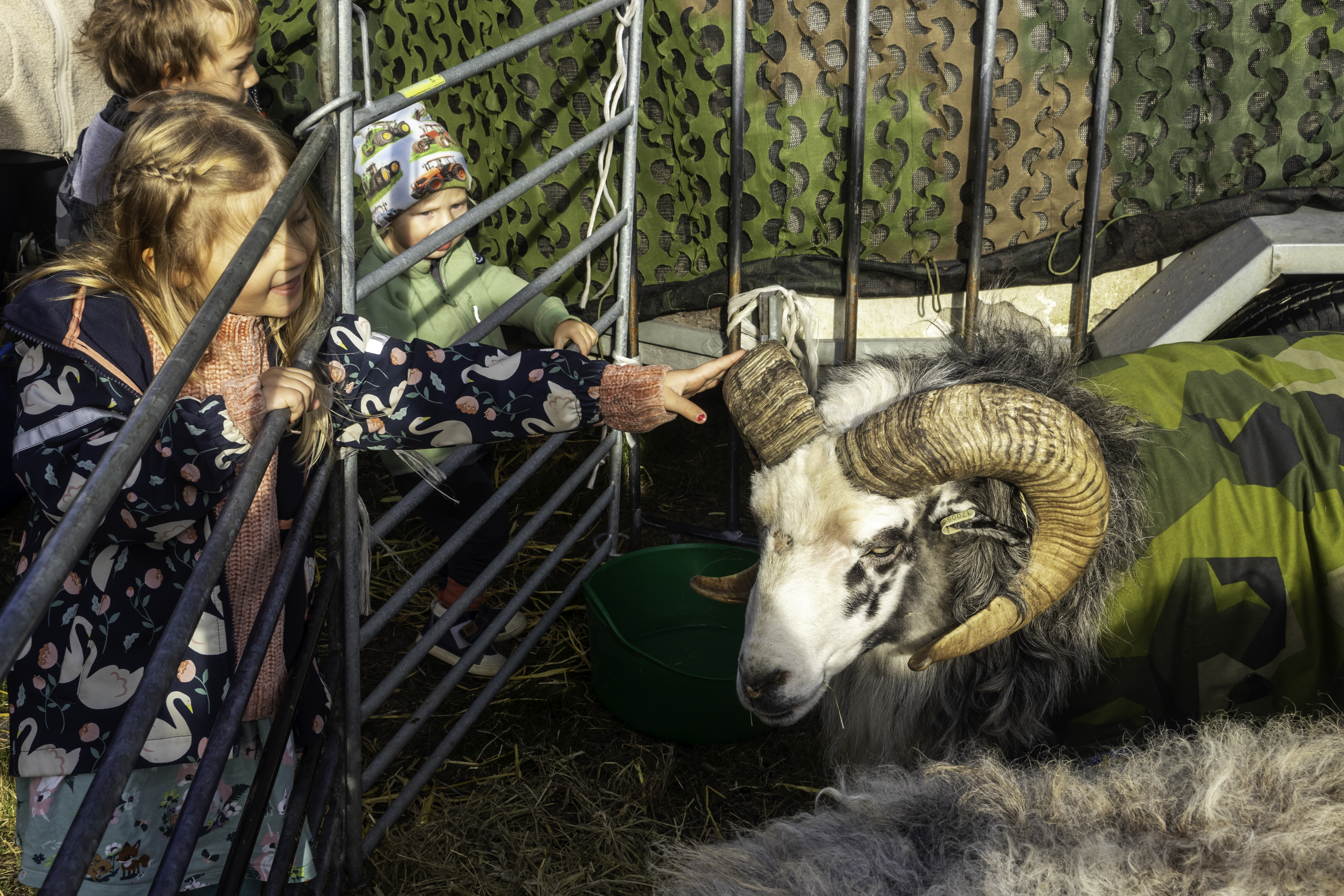
Harald VI, the former regimental mascot

== Commanding officers ==
Regimental commander active from when the regiment was organized as an armoured unit. For regimental commander before 1963, see Gotland Infantry Regiment. From 1982 to 1994, the regimental commander was subordinate to the commanding officer of the Gotland Military Command (MKG). For the years 1994–2000, see Gotland Regiment and Gotland Brigade (MekB 18).

- 1963-04-01 – 1964-03-31: COL Jan von Horn (appointed 1957-10-01)
- 1964-04-01 – 1971-09-30: COL Gerhard Hjukström
- 1971-10-01 – 1976-09-30: COL Nils Stenqvist
- 1976-10-01 – 1977-09-30: COL Curt Hasselgren
- 1977-10-01 – 1980-03-31: COL Hodder Stjernswärd
- 1980-04-01 – 1983-03-31: COL Lars-Eric Wahlgren
- 1983-04-01 – 1983-09-30: LTC Bengt Hammarhjelm
- 1983-10-01 – 1988-09-30: COL Stig Barke
- 1988-10-01 – 1992-06-30: COL Anders Sifvertsson
- 1992-07-01 – 1994-06-30: LTC/COL Karlis Neretnieks
- 1994-07-01 – 2000-06-30: See Gotland Regiment and Gotland Brigade
- 2000-07-01 – 2003-08-31: COL Peter Molin
- 2003-09-01 – 2005-06-30: COL Gunnar Karlson
- 2005-07-01 – 2006-08-31: LTC Ronny Larsson (Led the disbandment of the regiment)
- 2018-01-01 – 2022-??-??: COL Mattias Ardin
- 2022-03-24 – 2023-08-16: COL Magnus Frykvall
- 2023-08-17 – 2026-03-31: COL Dan Rasmussen
- 2026-04-01 – 2030-06-30: COL Andreas Gustafsson

== Names, designations and locations ==
Name	Translation	From		To
Kungl Gotlands regemente	Royal Gotland Regiment	1963-04-01	–	1974-12-31
Gotlands regemente	Gotland Regiment	1975-01-01	–	1982-06-30
Gotlands regemente	Gotland Regiment	2000-07-01	–	2004-12-31
Avvecklingsorganisation	Decommissioning Organisation	2005-07-01	–	2006-08-31
Designation		From		To
P 18		1963-04-01	–	1982-06-30
MKG/P 18		1982-07-01	–	1994-06-30
P 18		2000-07-01	–	2004-12-31
AO P 18		2005-01-01	–	2006-08-31
Location		From		To
Visby Garrison		1963-04-01	–	2006-08-31

== See also ==
- List of Swedish armoured regiments
- Military on Gotland
- Gotland Artillery Regiment
