= Göta Armoured Life Guards' Company in Gotland =

- Göta pansarlivgardes kompani på Gotland
- Active: 1944–1963
- Country: Sweden
- Allegiance: Swedish Armed Forces
- Branch: Swedish Army
- Type: Armoured
- Size: Company
- Part of: Göta Armour Guards Regiment
- Garrison/HQ: Visby
- Colors: Red
- March: "Göta livgardes marsch" (Schubert) (Note: The company shared the march with the Göta Armour Guards Regiment.)
- Battle honours: Svensksund (1790)

Göta Armoured Life Guards' Company in Gotland (Swedish: Göta pansarlivgardes kompani på Gotland or P 1 Gotland), designated P 1 G, was a Swedish Army armoured unit that was active in various forms 1944–1963. The unit was based in Visby Garrison in Visby, Gotland. It was part of Göta Armour Guards Regiment until 1963.

== History ==
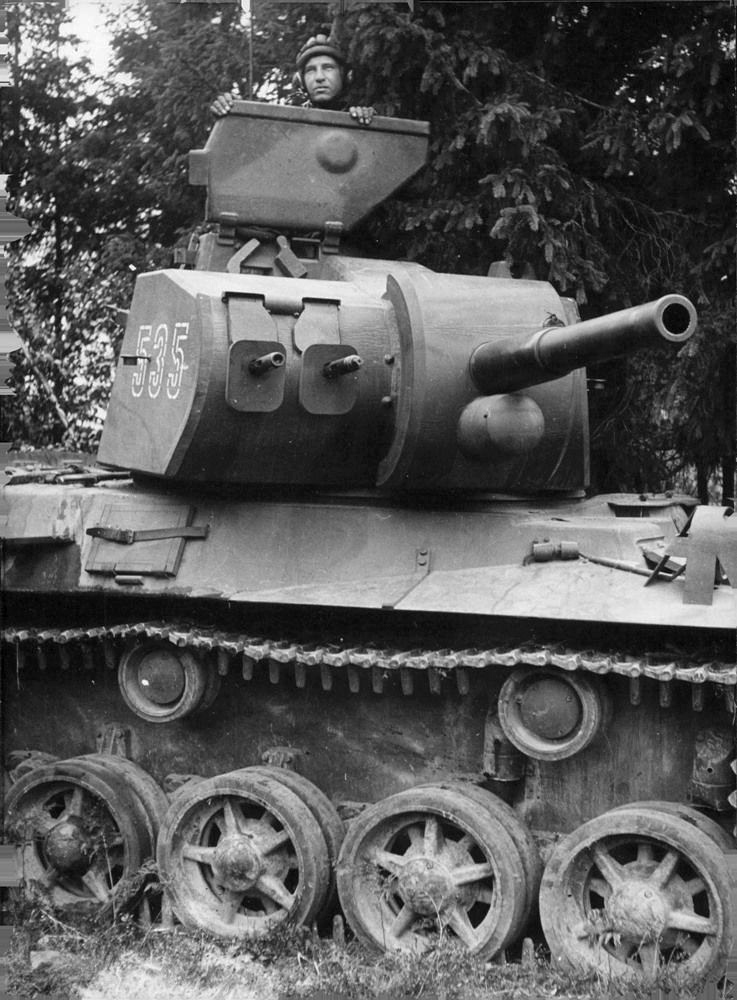
A Stridsvagn m/42 similar to the company's initial equipment, photographed in 1943.

The unit was raised in 1944 as a detachment on Gotland of the Göta Armour Guards Regiment (P 1). The detachment mainly consisted of a heavy tank company, which had been added from the 10th Armored Brigade. Initially, the company was armed with 18 Stridsvagn m/42, which were replaced in September by 20 Stridsvagn m/41. On 30 March 1963, the detachment was disbanded. On 1 April 1963, the unit was amalgamated with the Gotland Infantry Regiment (I 18) and formed Gotland Regiment (P 18).

== Barracks and training areas ==
=== Barracks ===
On 1 October 1944, the company was placed to Gotland. The detachment was placed in barracks at Gotland Infantry Regiment (I 18). From 1946, the detachment moved into a newly built barracks, Barracks IV (known from the 1960s as barracks Havde), at Gotland Infantry Regiment.

=== Training areas ===
The detachment on Gotland conducted its training at Hällarna in Visby and at the Tofta proving ground.

== Heraldry and traditions ==
=== Colours, standards and guidons ===
The unit received its colour on 6 June 1947. It was presented by the military commander of the VII Military Area, major general Samuel Åkerhielm at a ceremony at Oscarsstanen, at which both I 18, A 7, P 1 G and Lv 3 G participated. P 1 G's colour was taken down on 31 March 1963, the last day P 1 G existed as an independent unit. The colour was then put away for 25 years. Colonel Stig Barke, the commanding officer of P 18 from 1983 to 1988, thought that P 18 would manage the memory of P 1 G with the colour as the basis. When P 18 on 30 March 1988 celebrated its 25 years as an armoured regiment, the colour was shown once again. It was handed over to major Anders Österberg, commander of the tank company, by the last commanding officer of P 1 G, the retired lieutenant colonel Bo Forsman. The colour then came to be carried in parallel with the regiment's own colour until the spring of 2000, when it was taken down for the last time, because the tank training at P 18 then ceased.

== Commanding officers ==
List of commanding officers of the detachment from 1944 to 1963.

- 1944-04-01 – 1945-09-30: CPT Rolf von Krusenstierna
- 1945-10-01 – 1949-05-20: CPT Bengt Ewertz
- 1949-05-21 – 1953-08-31: CPT Sten Sundblad
- 1953-09-01 – 1955-09-30: CPT Gustaf Follin
- 1955-10-01 – 1959-03-31: CPT Gunnar Lagerström
- 1959-04-01 – 1963-03-31: CPT Bo Forsman

== Names, designations and locations ==
Name	Translation	From		To
Göta pansarlivgardes kompani på Gotland	Göta Armoured Life Guards' Company in Gotland	1944-10-01	–	1963-03-31
Designation		From		To
P 1 G		1944-10-01	–	1963-03-31
Location		From		To
Visby Garrison		1944-10-01	–	1963-03-31

== See also ==
- List of Swedish armoured regiments
