= Alexander von Strussenfelt =

Swedish nobleman and diplomat

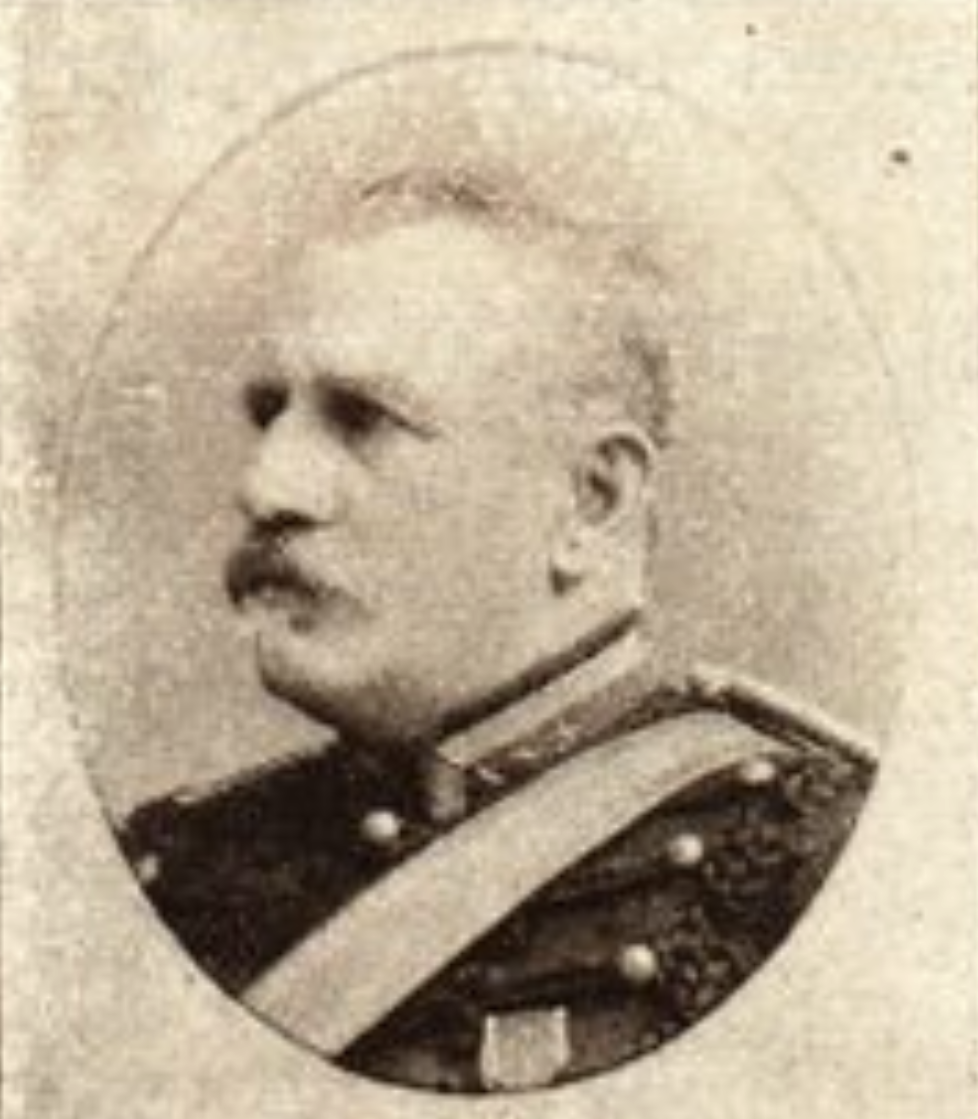
- Born: 5 August 1846; Visby, Gotland, Sweden
- Died: 17 December 1927 (aged 81); Karlskoga, Sweden
- Noble family: Strussenfelt
- Spouse: Matilda Margareta Fogelin
- Issue: Alexis von Strussenfelt; Gunhild von Strussenfelt
- Father: Adolf Ludvig von Strussenfelt
- Mother: Hilda Aurora Sundberg

Alexander Johan Baltazar von Strussenfelt (5 August 1846 – 17 December 1927) was a Swedish nobleman and soldier.

== Early life and career ==
A member of the noble Strussenfelt family, Strussenfelt was born in Visby, Gotland, the first son of Adolf Ludvig von Strussenfelt and his wife Hilda Aurora Sundberg.

Strussenflet entered the army in 1864. He was promoted to commanding officer in 1895 to the Gotland Artillery Regiment.

Strussenfelt died on December 17, 1927, in Karlskoga.

== Dates of rank ==
- 1872 – Lieutenant (Swedish Army)
- 1877 – Captain
- 1894 – Major
- 1898 – Lieutenant colonel
- 1905 – Colonel
