= Gotland Artillery Regiment =

Coordinates: 57°37′59″N 18°18′3″E

- Gotlands artilleriregemente
- Active: 1811–1982, 1994–2000
- Country: Sweden
- Branch: Swedish Army
- Type: Artillery
- Size: Regiment
- Part of: VII milo (1942–1966); Milo Ö (1966–1982); MKG (1982–1994); Milo M (1994–2000)
- Garrison/HQ: Visby
- Patron: Saint Barbara
- Colors: Light grey
- March: "Gotlands artilleriregementets marsch" (Wilhelm Löfdahl) (Note: The march was established in 1953 by Army Order 33/1953.)
- Anniversaries: 4 December

Insignia
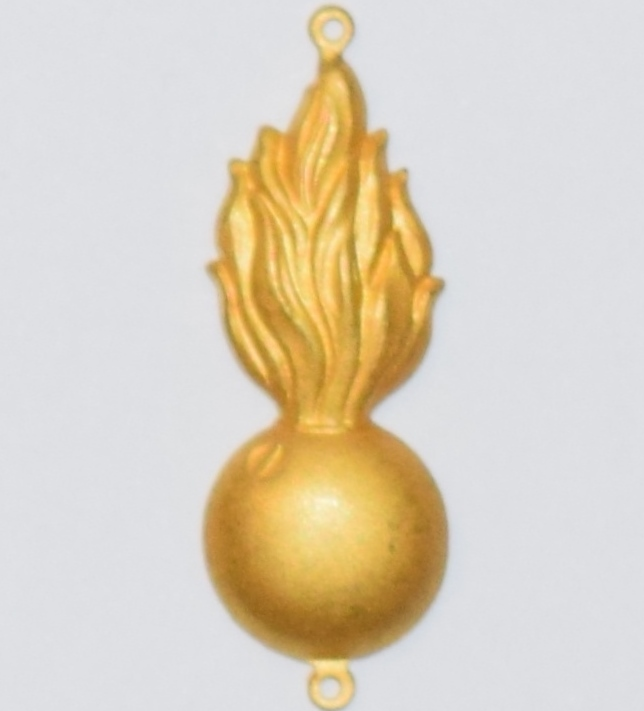
- Branch insignia

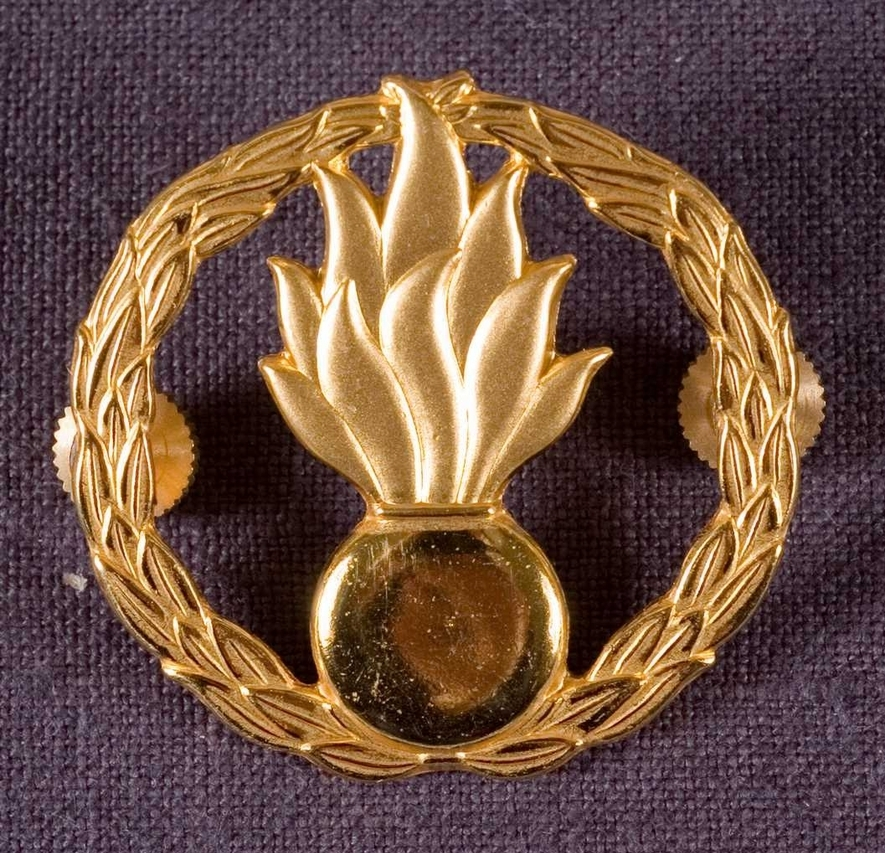
- Cap badge

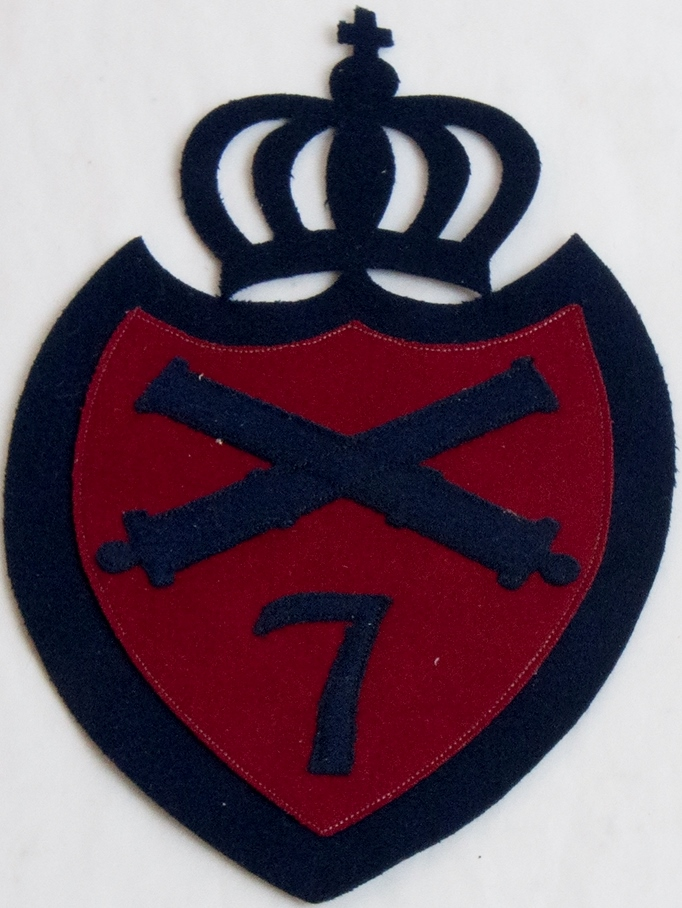
- Shoulder sleeve insignia m/1906

The Gotland Artillery Regiment (Swedish: Gotlands artilleriregemente, designation A 7) was a Swedish Army artillery regiment that was in active service between 1811 and 2000. The regiment was based in Visby as part of the Gotland Garrison.

== History ==
The regiment origins from the Artillery Conscripts of the Gotland National Conscription (Gotlands nationalbevärings artilleribeväring), which were organized in 1811 as a result of the Russian occupation of Gotland in 1808 and by a convention adopted by the islanders in December 1810, which was ratified by King Charles XIII on 5 February 1811. It consisted then of two artillery batteries and a fortification company with a squad of 100 men, located in Visby. The unit was reorganized in 1861 into Gotland National Conscription Artillery Corps (Gotlands nationalbevärings artillerikår) and was given the designation No 4. In 1887 the corps changed its name to Gotland Artillery Corps (No 4). The Gotland Artillery Corps was redesignated No 7 in 1892 so that the planned Norrland Artillery Regiment could become No 4. In 1914 the name was changed to A 7. In conjunction with the so called OLLI reform, which was carried out by the Swedish Armed Forces in 1973 and in 1975, A units and B units were created. The A units were regiments responsible for a defence district, and the B units were training regiments. In Gotland's case, it distinguished itself from the allotment on the mainland. This when the VII. Military Area was reorganized into Gotland Military Command (MKG) in 1966. The military command constituted a special command and control organization within the Eastern Military District, but did not have the overall responsibility for the administration of the island. Furthermore, the professional mobilization was led on a unit level. Through the reform, the full mobilization and material responsibility within the military command was added, regardless of military branch. This meant that the Gotland Artillery Corps which was included in the Gotland Military Command (MKG) came to be a B unit (training regiment). By the reform, the corps adopted the new name Gotland Artillery Regiment on 1 July 1975.

Prior to the Defence Act of 1977 and 1982, the Gotland Artillery Regiment was exempted from the investigation carried out by the National Institute of Defence Organization and Management (Försvarets rationaliseringsinstitut). In the Defence Act of 1977, the Gotland Artillery Regiment was exempted because of regional political conditions. Instead the National Institute of Defence Organization and Management believed that the Småland Artillery Regiment (A 6) with the Artillery Cadet and Aspirant School (Artilleriets kadett- och aspirantskola, ArtKAS) as well as the Miloverkstaden in Jönköping would be disbanded. The Supreme Commander and the Chief of the Army, however, believed that no artillery regiment would be disbanded. However, the National Institute of Defence Organization and Management suggested in their investigation to give the Supreme Commander the task of examining the further development of the OLLI organization. In a further development, it wanted to merge Gotland Regiment (P 18), Gotland Artillery Regiment (A 7) and Gotland Anti-Aircraft Battalion (Lv 2) into an army regiment. Prior to the Defence Act of 1982, the Boden Artillery Regiment, Gotland Artillery Regiment, Norrland Artillery Regiment, Wendes Artillery Regiment and the Bergslagen Artillery Regiment were exempted from the review of finding a cost reduction within the artillery. The Gotland Artillery Regiment were exempted from the investigation of disbandment, partly because of regional policy considerations but also demands for the war organization's preparedness and mobilization. The merger proposed by the government to the Riksdag in the previous act had not been implemented. This meant that the government once again proposed to the Riksdag to merge the staffs of the Gotland Regiment, Gotland Artillery Regiment and the Gotland Anti-Aircraft Battalion with the staff of the Gotland Military Command, and form an authority from 1 July 1982.

Through the Defence Act of 1992, the Gotland Military Command was separated from the Gotland Regiment, Gotland Artillery Regiment and the Gotland Anti-Aircraft Corps, and formed independent units from 1 July 1994. The military command came to only lead all operations on Gotland, which on the mainland were solved by the defense area staffs, division staffs and naval command staffs. Prior to the Defence Act of 2000, the government proposed in its Bill 1999/2000:30 that only one artillery regiment would remain in the basic organization. The regiments which the government wanted to disband included Gotland Artillery Regiment. This in the light that the government considered it unsuitable to centralize the artillery training to Gotland, not least due to the investment needs and the limited opportunities for long-term manpower. Remaining in the artillery of the new basic organization was the Bergslagen Artillery Regiment, this because the government considered that to be the regiment which had the best conditions for long-term training and practice of artillery units. On 30 June 2000, the Gotland Artillery Regiment was disbanded. On 1 July 2000, the Bergslagen Artillery Regiment took the new name, the Artillery Regiment.

== Operations ==
In 1901 the corps was reorganized, and was increased so that it amounted to three batteries and a position company with a strength of 21 officers, 14 non-commissioned officers, four civilian servicemen and 156 male permanent workers. In the 1990s, the regiment was responsible for training of divisions artillery staff and battalions and brigade artillery battalions and armored artillery battalion included in the Gotland Military Command (MKG). When the Svea Artillery Regiment was disbanded, primary weapon systems of the regiment, Haubits 77B, were transferred to Gotland Artillery Regiment.

== Units ==
=== Companies ===
- Wisborgs Company (21st)
- Stålhatts Company (22nd)
- Carlswärds Company (23rd)

== Locations and training areas ==
=== Barracks ===
The units first barracks were located at S:t Hansgatan 19 in Visby, where it was located from 8 November 1839. On 8 June 1893 some parts of the unit were relocated to Grahams Mechanical Workshop at Hamnplan 1 In 1902, some parts of the unit were relocated to Strandgatan 12-14. On 13 April 1909, the unit moved into newly built barracks at Östra Hansegatan 28. The unit was located at Östra Hansegatan until 30 June 1986, when it was from 1 July 1986 colocalized with the Gotland Regiment at Langs väg 4. On 24 May 1986 a closing ceremony was held at Östra Hansegatan. At the Gotland Regiment, the unit moved into the Barracks 1, which was highlighted by a ceremony on 7 October 1988.

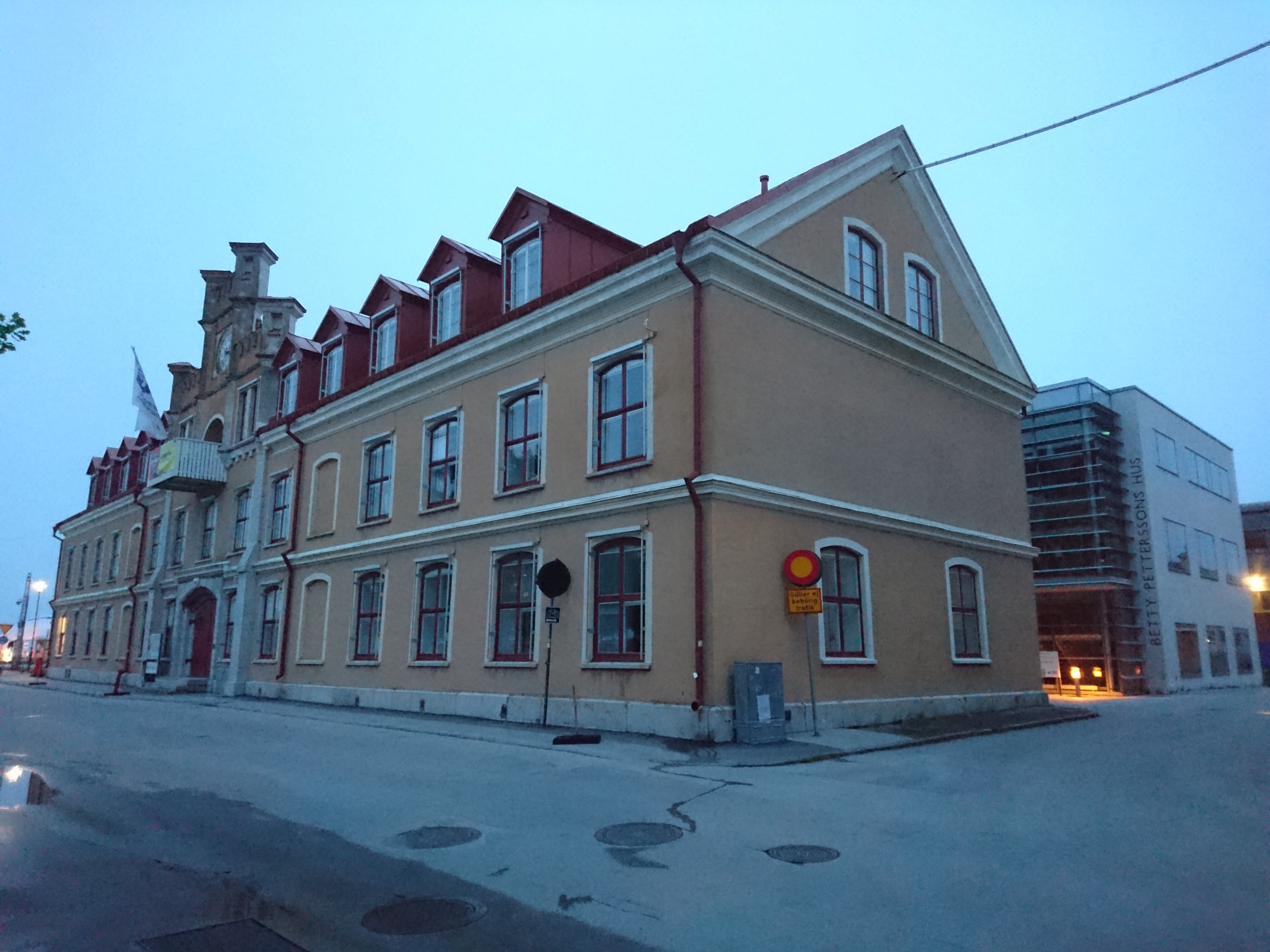
Barracks at Hamnplan 1

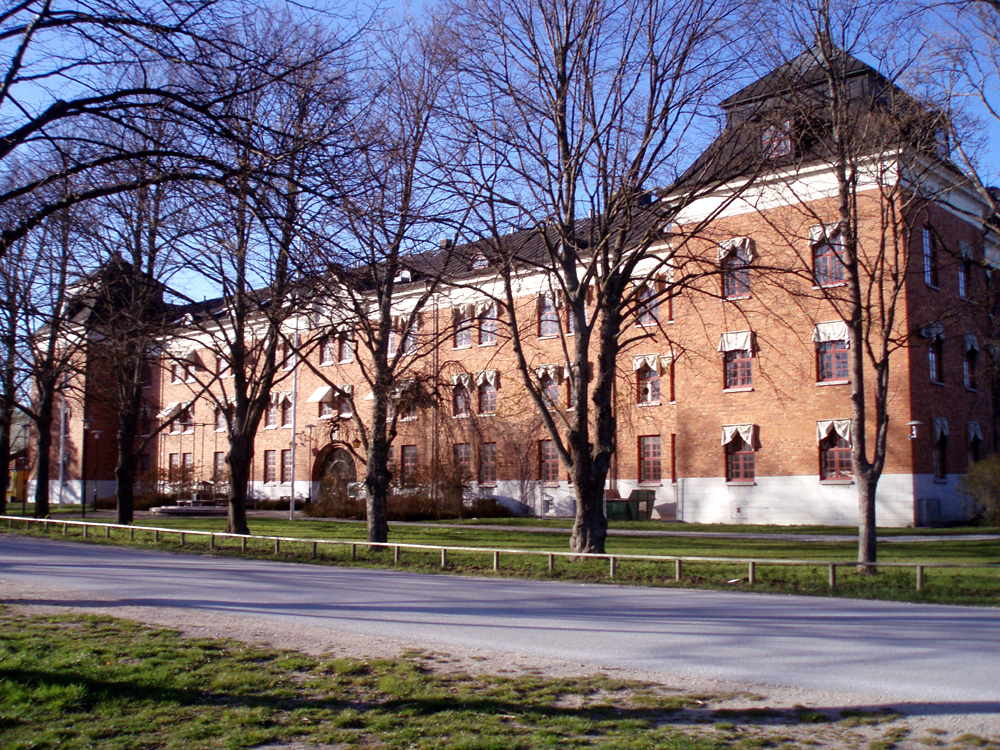
Chancery building and barracks I (from south)

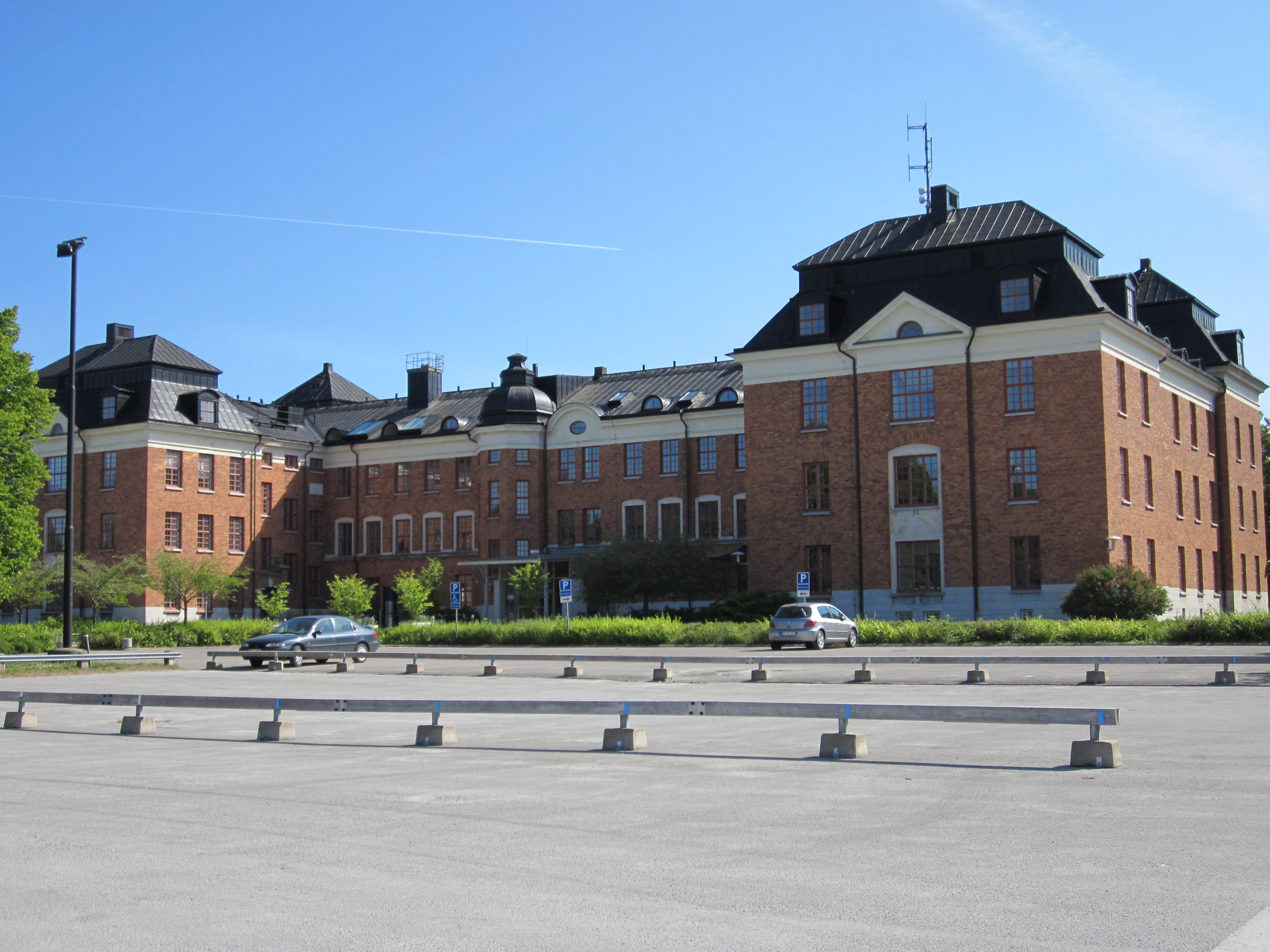
Chancery building and barracks I (from north)

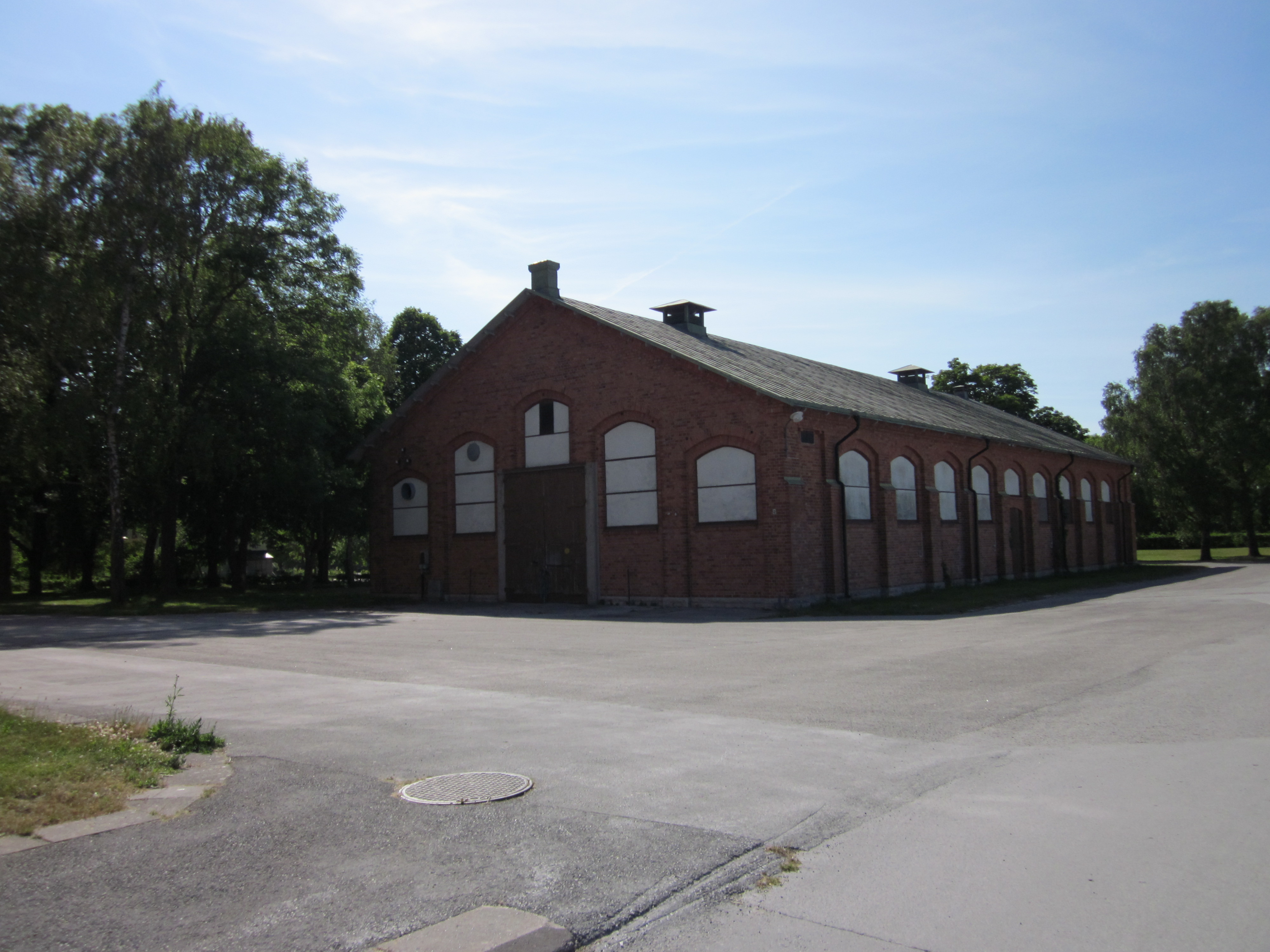
Riding/artillery piece hall

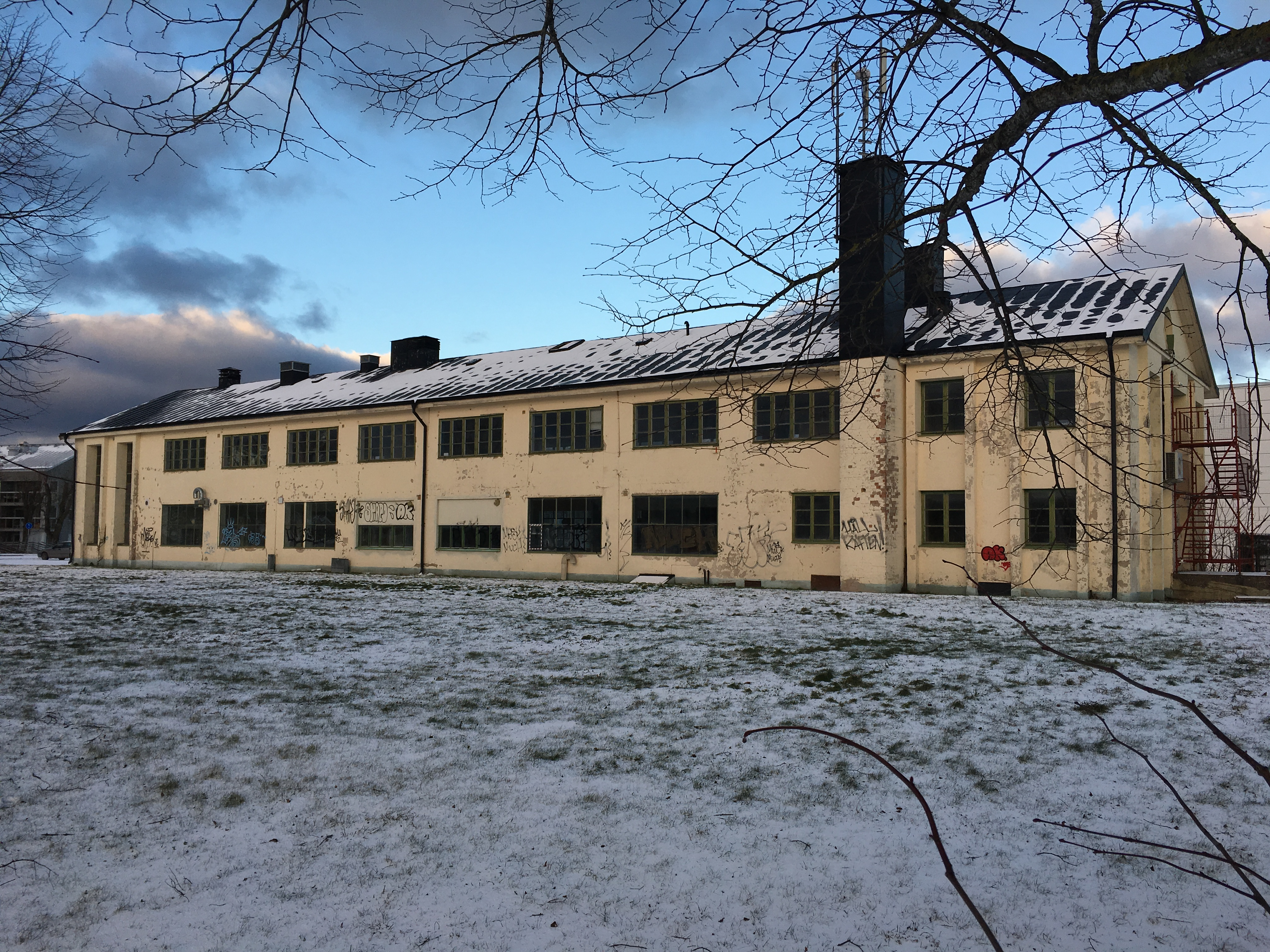
Ordnance workshop

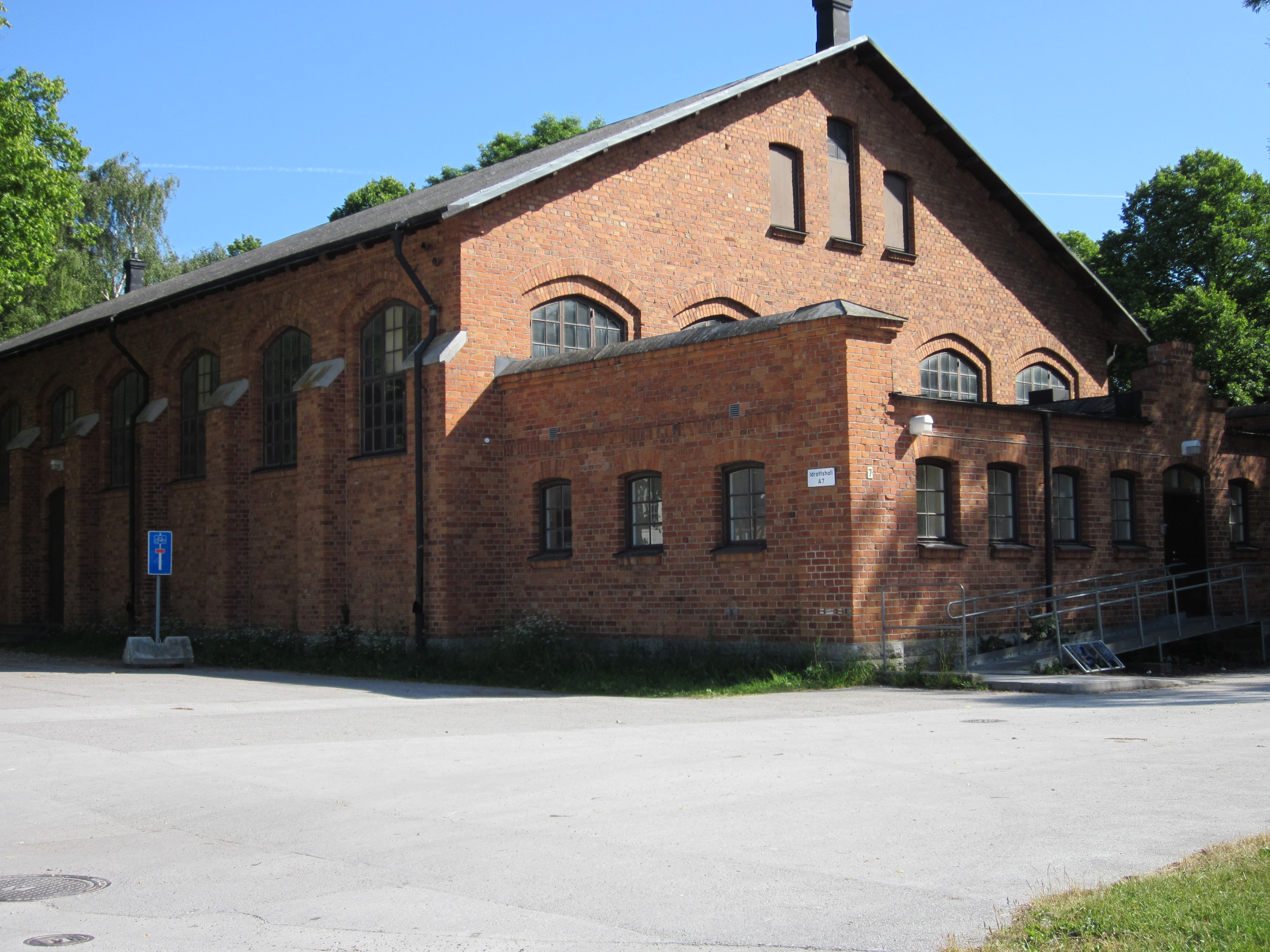
Gym

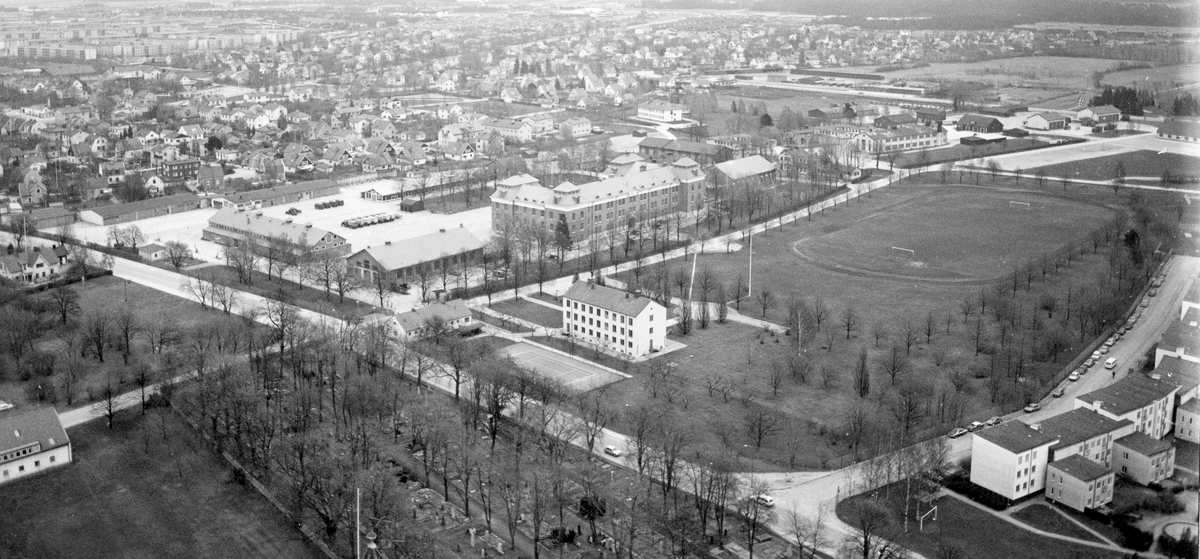
1970s aerial view

=== Training areas ===
The regiment's first training area was located 18 km northeast of Visby at Martebo mire. From 1 August 1898 it used Tofta firing range, located about 6 km south of Visby.

== Heraldry and traditions ==
=== Colours, standards and guidons ===
The regimental colour was presented by His Majesty the King Gustaf V on his birthday on 16 June 1938. After the Svea Artillery Regiment was disbanded on 31 December 1997, its colours and traditions was transferred to the Gotland Artillery Regiment. Gotland Artillery Regiment carried the colours to the side of its own until it was disbanded on 30 June 2000. The colours of the Svea Artillery Regiment was taken over by the Artillery Regiment.

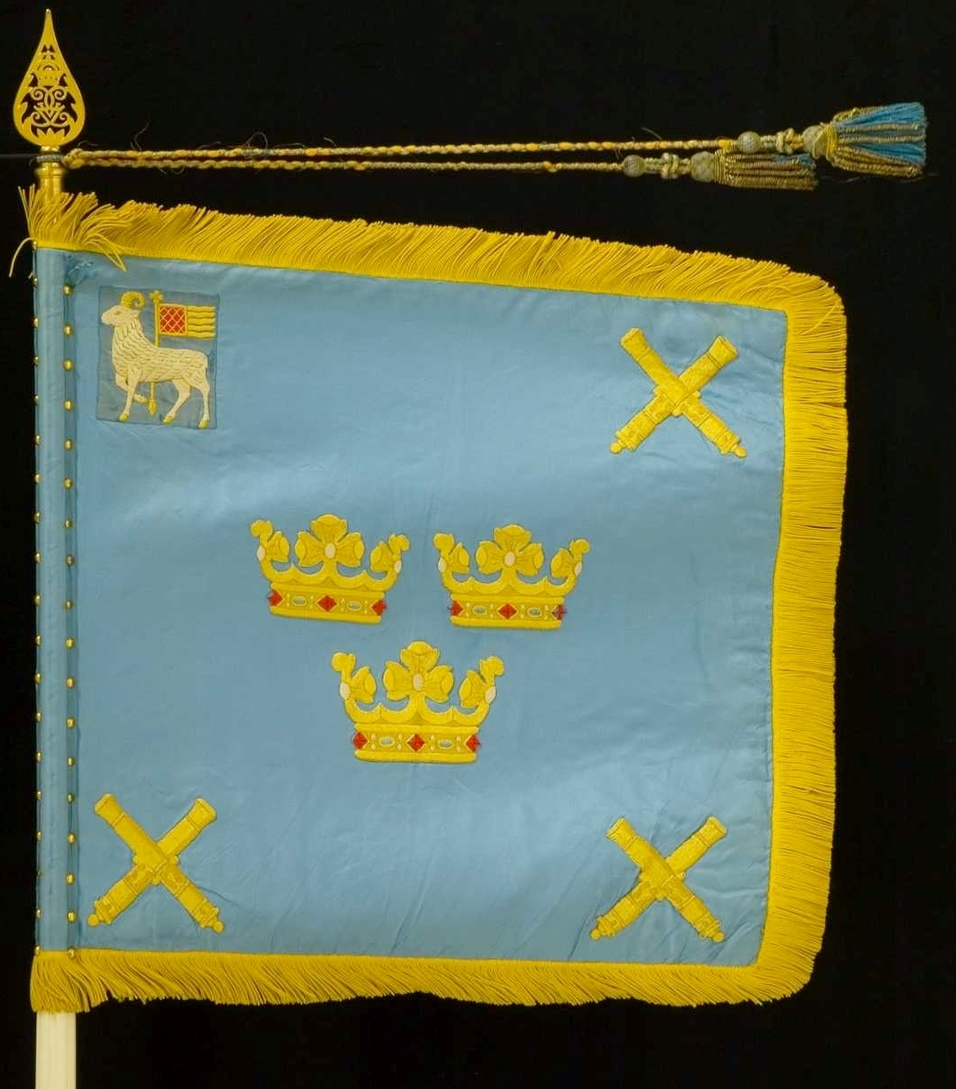
The colour of the Gotland Artillery Regiment.

=== Coat of arms ===
The coat of the arms of the Gotland Artillery Regiment (A 7) 1977–2000. Blazon: "Azure, the provincial badge of Gotland, a ram passant argent armed or, banner gules with crosstaff, edging and five flaps or. The shield surmounted two gunbarrels of older pattern in saltire or. The gunbarrels may be sable".

=== Medals ===
In 1947, the Gotlands artilleriregementes (A 7) förtjänstmedalj ("Gotland Artillery Regiment (A 7) Medal of Merit") in gold and silver (GotartregGM/SM) of the 8th size was established. The medal ribbon is divided in green, red and green moiré.

In 2000, the Gotlands artilleriregementes (A 7) minnesmedalj ("Gotland Artillery Regiment (A 7) Commemorative Merit") in silver (GotlartregSMM) of the 8th size was established. The medal ribbon is divided in red, green and red moiré.

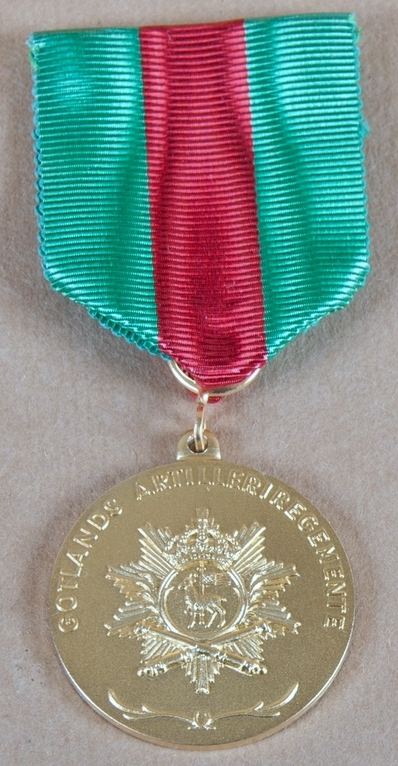
Gotland Artillery Regiment (A 7) Medal of Merit in gold.

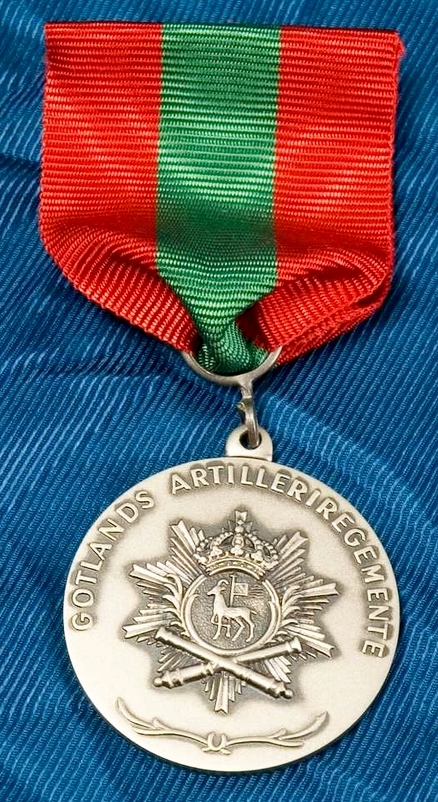
Gotland Artillery Regiment (A 7) Commemorative Medal in silver.

=== Heritage ===
The traditions of the Gotland Artillery Regiment are preserved since 1 July 2000 by the Artillery Regiment. The traditions were preserved from 2000 to 2005 by the Gotland Regiment (P 18). A special manifestation on the day of the disbandment took place and a march was conducted through Visby with visits to a number of "A 7 places". The closing ceremony took place in the Donnershage which included the handover of the A 7's colours to the Artillery Regiment. At tattoo, the unveiling of the memorial stone placed in front of chancellery of the Gotland Regiment took place.

== Commanding officers ==
Commanding officers of the artillery on Gotland from 1860 to 2000. The commanding officer was referred to as kårchef ("corps commander") between 1860 and 1975 and regementschef ("regimental commander") between 1975 and 1982 and 1994 to 2000. During the years 1982–1994, the commanding officer was subordinate to the commanding officer of the Gotland Military Command (MKG).

=== 1860–1887 ===
- 1860–1868: LtCol Christer d'Albedyhll
- 1868–1879: LtCol Carl Edvard E af Chapman
- 1879–1884: LtCol Thiodolf Bernhard Borgh
- 1884–1886: LtCol Frans Thomas Schartau

=== 1887–2000 ===
Commanding officers 1887–2000:

- 1887-01-01 – 1894-02-15: LtCol Frans Thomas Schartau
- 1894-02-16 – 1895-12-05: Maj/LtCol Claes Johan Viktor A. Meurling
- 1895-12-06 – 1906-06-07: Maj/LtCol/Col Alexander von Strussenfelt
- 1906-06-08 – 1909-01-11: LtCol Gabriel Axel Torén
- 1909-01-12 – 1911-04-03: LtCol Karl Toll
- 1911-04-04 – 1913-04-03: LtCol Claes Axel Breitholtz
- 1913-04-21 – 1915-12-02: LtCol John Gustaf Gerhard Améen
- 1915-12-03 – 1919-03-19: LtCol Bo Arvid Tarras-Wahlberg
- 1919-03-20 – 1926-10-15: LtCol Bertil Lilliehöök
- 1926-10-16 – 1927-12-31: LtCol/Col Carl Georg Ohlson
- 1928-01-01 – 1931-??-??: LtCol/Col Gunnar Ludvig Malkolm Salander
- 1931-10-17 – 1934-04-30: LtCol Per Falk
- 1934-05-31 – 1939-09-31: LtCol Carl-Gustaf David Hamilton
- 1939-10-01 – 1941-06-30: LtCol/Col Gustaf Dyrssen
- 1941-07-01 – 1943-09-31: Col Curt Sixten Reinhold Kempff
- 1943-10-01 – 1945-01-31: Col Bert Carpelan
- 1945-02-01 – 1947-03-31: Col Erik Thorsten Berggren
- 1947-04-01 – 1949-03-31: Col Arvid Mauritz Eriksson
- 1949-04-01 – 1953-09-31: Col Nils Oskar Söderberg
- 1953-10-01 – 1959-09-31: Col Göran Schildt
- 1959-10-01 – 1970-03-31: Col Tore Edvard Deutgen
- 1970-04-01 – 1974-06-30: Col Stig Alrik Nihlén
- 1974-07-01 – 1975-03-31: LtCol Karl-Erik Bellvar Kennerby
- 1975-04-01 – 1978-09-31: Col Carl Arcadius Holger Areskoug
- 1978-10-01 – 1980-03-31: Col Reinhold Lahti
- 1980-04-01 – 1982-05-31: Col Erik Helge Gard
- 1982-06-01 – 1990-04-31: LtCol/Col Curt-Christer Bertil Gustafsson
- 1990-05-01 – 1991-02-28: Col Hans Gunnar Dellner
- 1991-03-01 – 1992-09-30: Col Kjell Åke Plantin
- 1992-10-01 – 1999-06-30: Col Bengt Olof (Olle) Allan Bjurström
- 1999-07-01 – 2000-??-??: LtCol Sven-Åke Asklander
- 2000-??-?? – 2000-06-30: LtCol Bo Hansson

== Names, designations and locations ==
Name	Translation	From		To
Gotlands nationalbevärings artilleribeväring	Gotland National Conscription's Artillery Conscripts	1811-02-05	–	1861-07-15
Gotlands nationalbevärings artillericorps	Gotland National Conscription's Artillery Corps	1861-07-16	–	1886-12-31
Kungl. Gotlands artillerikår	Royal Gotland Artillery Corps	1887-01-01	–	1974-12-31
Gotlands artillerikår	Gotland Artillery Corps	1975-01-01	–	1975-06-30
Gotlands artilleriregemente	Gotland Artillery Regiment	1975-07-01	–	1982-06-30
Gotlands artilleriregemente	Gotland Artillery Regiment	1994-07-01	–	2000-06-30
Avvecklingsorganisation	Decommissioning Organisation	2000-07-01	–	2001-06-30
Designation		From		To
–		1811-02-05	–	1861-07-15
№ 4		1861-07-16	–	1892-12-31
№ 7		1893-01-01	–	1914-09-30
A 7		1914-10-01	–	1982-06-30
A 7		1994-07-01	–	2000-06-30
Location		From		To
Visby Garrison		1943-07-01	–	2000-06-30

== See also ==
- Military on Gotland
- Gotland Brigade
- Gotland Regiment
- Gotland Infantry Regiment
- List of Swedish artillery regiments
