= Gotland Infantry Regiment =

Coordinates: 57°36′48″N 18°16′57″E

- Gotlands infanteriregemente
- Active: 1887–1963
- Country: Sweden
- Allegiance: Swedish Armed Forces
- Branch: Swedish Army
- Type: Infantry
- Size: Regiment
- Part of: CO of Gotland (1867–1893); Gotland Military Area (1893–1936); Gotland's Troops (1937–1942); VII Military District (1942–1963)
- Garrison/HQ: Visby
- Colours: Red and white (−1953); Blue and white (1954–1963)
- March: "In Treue Fest" (Teike) (Note: Adopted as the Gotland Infantry Regiment's (I 18) march in 1909. It was established in 1953 by Army Order 33/1953. The march was taken over by Gotland Regiment and was used by the Gotland Brigade from 1994 to 2000.)

Insignia
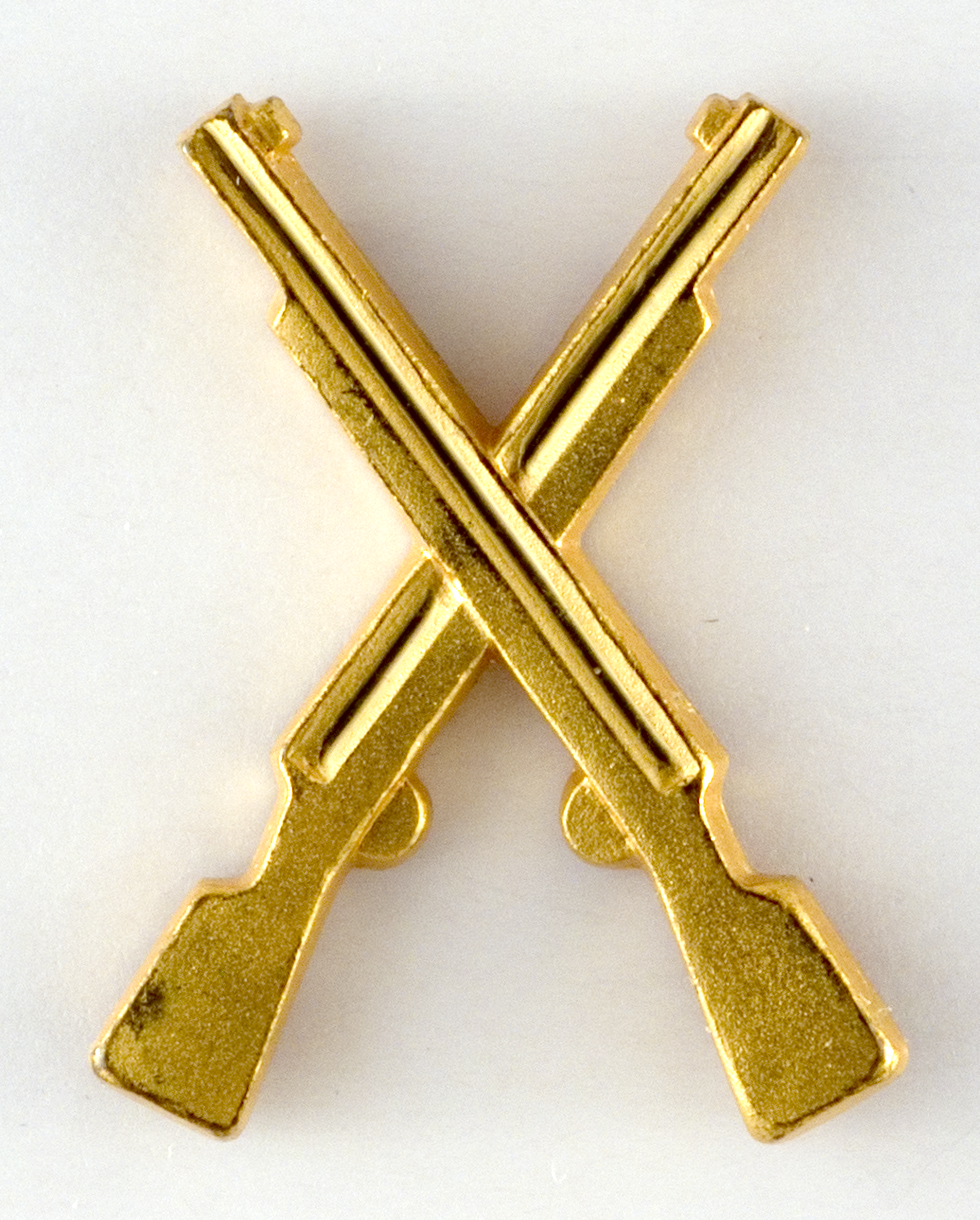
- Branch insignia m/60

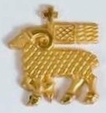
- Unit insignia m/60

The Gotland Infantry Regiment (Swedish: Gotlands infanteriregemente), designations I 27 and I 18, was a Swedish Army infantry regiment that traced its origins back to the 19th century. It was reorganized into an armoured regiment in 1963. The regiment's soldiers were originally recruited on the island of Gotland, and it was later garrisoned there.

== History ==
The regiment has its origins in the unit Gotland National Conscription which was created in 1811. By a parliamentary decision in 1866 the Gotland National Conscription was transformed into an infantry regiment and an artillery corps (I 27 and A 4). A colonel was made regimental commander who also acted as the commander of Gotland's troops. The lieutenant colonel of the regiment came actually to serve as regimental commander until 1937. As of 1 January 1887 the regiment's name was Royal Gotland Infantry Regiment with the designation I 27. The regiment got a similar organization to other infantry regiments. The National Conscription's company area division remained until 1900 as the registration authority.

In 1892, the agreement that Gotland's troops may not be called for military service outside the island was repealed. At the same time the name Gotland National Conscription was dropped. In 1901, the army order on the mainland and Gotland became similar. This admitted, among other things, that conscripts from the mainland were transferred for training at I 27. There, at the same time, bicycle infantry training began. In 1915, the regiment got Visborg Kungsladugård's land as training area and all the buildings as storehouses. The bicycle infantry was developed during the World War I and the 1920s so far that I 18 (which the regiment was designated from 1928) circa 1930 became the Sweden's first bicycle regiment with motorized trains.

The Defence Act of 1925 meant the end of the regiment. The regiment was downgraded to a corps which took over Västmanland Regiment designation I 18. The officers corps was reduced by 2/3. The mainland contingent of conscripts was also reduced substantially. In 1936, the Royal Swedish Gotland Infantry Corps was upgraded to a regiment with the name Royal Gotland Infantry Regiment, I 18. During World War II, armored units were added through the Göta Armoured Life Guards' Company in Gotland (P 1 G). Before the end of the war, this detachment was able to organize three companies (Stridsvagn m/42 and Stridsvagn m/37 and Pansarbil m/41).

Through the 1949 war organization, I 18, supported by P 1 G, became responsible for an armored reinforced bicycle brigade of five battalions. The seven armored companies received via Stridsvagn m/41, Stridsvagn m/40, Infanterikanonvagn 102 finally Stridsvagn 74. On 1 April 1963, the detachment was amalgamated with Gotland Infantry Regiment (I 18) and formed the Gotland Regiment (P 18) and was simultaneously transferred to the Swedish Armoured Troops.

== Heraldry and traditions ==
=== Coat of arms ===
The coat of the arms of the Gotland Infantry Regiment. It was used by Gotland Group (Gotlandsgruppen) since 2000. Blazon: "Azure, the provincial badge of Gotland, a ram passant argent, armed or, banner gules, crosstaff, edging and five flaps or. The shield surmounted two swords in saltire or".

== Commanding officers ==
Commanding officers active at the regiment the years 1884–1963. During the years 1884–1927 and 1937–1963, the commanding officer was referred to as regementschef ("regimental commander"). During the years 1928–1937 the commanding officer was referred to as kårchef ("corps commander").

=== Gotland Infantry Regiment, I 27 (1887–1928) ===
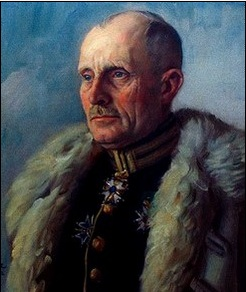
Painting by Ivar Kamke of Colonel Olof Thörnell, commander of Gotland Infantry Corps (1928–1931).

- 1884-04-09 – 1896-12-31: Col Herman von Hohenhausen
- 1895-07-29 – 1908-12-11: Col Gustaf Björlin
- 1908-12-18 – 1912-04-13: Col Oscar Silverstolpe
- 1912-07-02 – 1916-12-31: Col Erik Bergström
- 1917-01-01 – 1922-10-21: Col Axel Carleson
- 1922-20-22 – 1927-12-31: Col Tell Schmidt

=== Gotland Infantry Corps, I 18 (1928–1937) ===
- 1928-01-01 – 1931-11-30: Col Olof Thörnell
- 1931-12-01 – 1937-03-31: Col Gösta Törngren

=== Gotland Infantry Regiment, I 18 (1937–1963) ===
- 1937-04-01 – 1940-12-31: Col Axel Linde
- 1941-01-01 – 1942-09-30: Col Pehr Janse
- 1942-10-01 – 1945-09-30: Col Gunnar Berggren
- 1945-10-01 – 1951-09-30: Col Herman Levin
- 1951-10-01 – 1957-09-30: Col Folke Haquinius
- 1957-10-01 – 1964-03-31: Col Jan von Horn

== Names, designations and locations ==
Name	Translation	From		To
Kungl. Gotlands infanteriregemente	Royal Gotland Infantry Regiment	1887-01-01	–	1927-12-31
Kungl. Gotlands infanterikår	Royal Gotland Infantry Corps	1928-01-01	–	1937-06-30
Kungl. Gotlands infanteriregemente	Royal Gotland Infantry Regiment	1937-07-01	–	1963-03-31
Designation		From		To
No. 27		1887-01-01	–	1914-09-30
I 27		1914-10-01	–	1927-12-31
I 18		1928-01-01	–	1963-03-31
Location		From		To
Visby Garrison		1905-09-30	–	1963-03-31

== See also ==
- List of Swedish infantry regiments
- Military on Gotland
- Gotland Brigade
- Gotland Regiment
- Gotland Artillery Regiment
