= War in Gotland =

A War in Gotland or Invasion of Gotland may refer to:

- War in Gotland (1288), a conflict between rural farmers and the burghers of Visby
- War in Gotland (1313), a tax conflict between King Birger and the Gutes
- Valdemar Atterdag's invasion of Gotland (1361), a Danish conquest
- War in Gotland (1398), a conflict between pirates and the Teutonic Order
- War in Gotland (1403–1404), a conflict between the Kalmar Union and the Teutonic Order
- War in Gotland (1448–1449), an invasion by King Karl Knutsson
- War in Gotland (1524), a Swedish invasion during the War of Liberation
- War in Gotland (1525), a Lübeckian invasion
- Invasion of Gotland (1676), a Danish sea-borne invasion
- Russian occupation of Gotland (1808), an occupation during the Finnish War
