= War in Gotland (1525) =

War in Gotland in 1525

War on Gotland
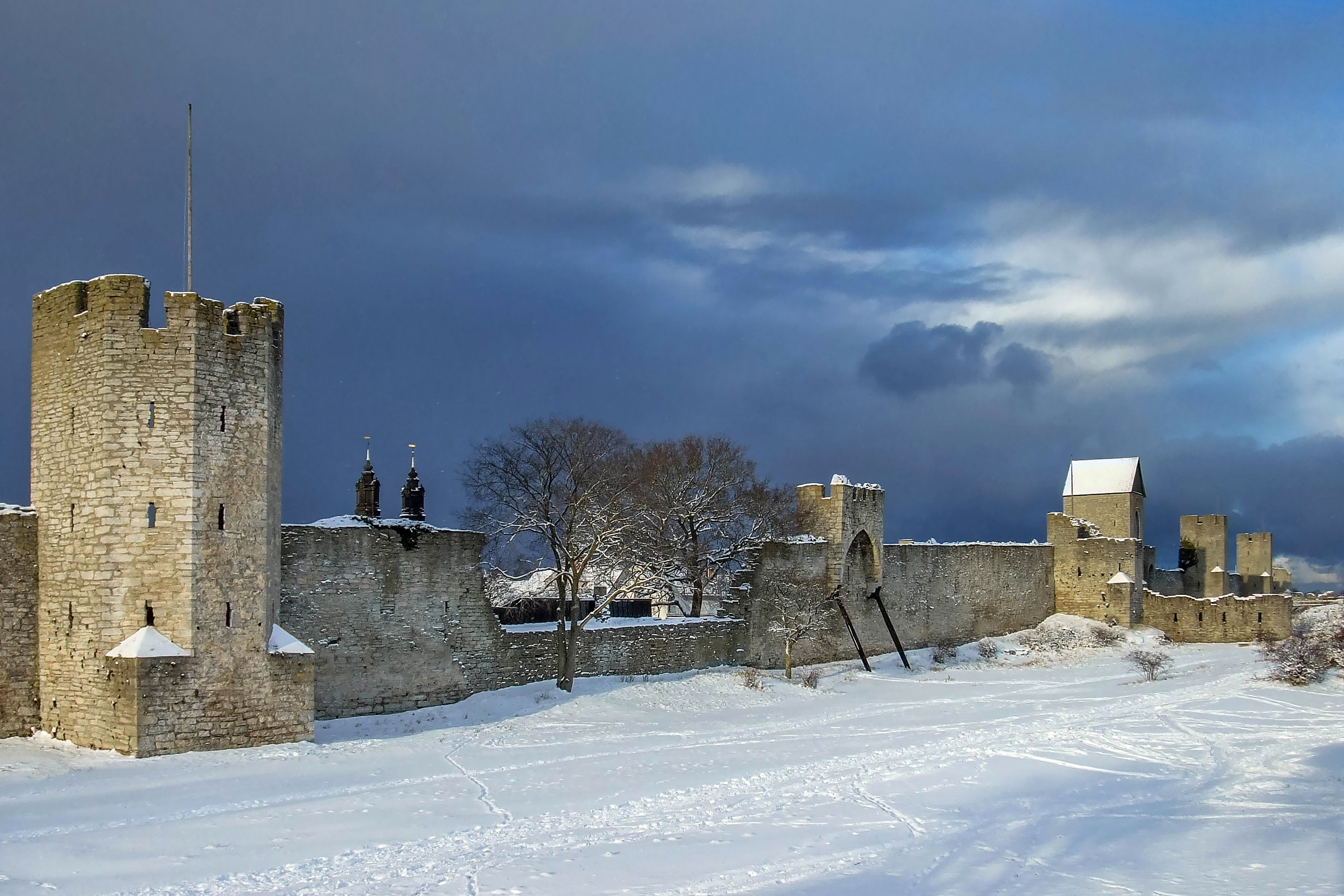
- Eastern part of the Visby City Wall facing towards the north and the Sparbössan
Date	1525
Location	Gotland
Result	Lübeckian victory
Territorial changes	Majority of Visby is plundered and razed

Belligerents
Lübeck (Gotland) Gute peasants	Søren Norby's forces Visby burghers

Commanders and leaders
(Lübeck) Daniell von Cölln (Lübeck) Conrad Wybbechinck	Otto Ulefeld

Units involved
Unknown	Visborg garrison

Strength
Unknown	Unknown

The War on Gotland (Swedish: Kriget på Gotland) was a successful Lübeckian invasion of Gotland in 1525.

== Background ==
In 1524, during the Swedish War of Liberation, Swedish and Lübeckian troops under Berend von Melen invaded Gotland in an attempt to oust Søren Norby from it, who had remained loyal to the-then deposed Christian II. The invasion would however, inevitably fail after Berend switched sides and Denmark had succeeded in gaining Gotland through diplomacy. However, in 1525, the Lübeckers tried to oust Søren again.

== War ==
On May 13, the Lübeckian army landed in the northwestern part of Visby near Silverhättan and at a "reasonable distance" from Visborg Castle, led by Daniell von Cöllin and Conrad Wybbechinck. The time of the invasion had been chosen carefully, as Søren was busy with his men in Blekinge trying to conquer land for Christian II. The Lübeckian's also knew about the disagreement between the peasants in the Gotlandic countryside, which was sometimes called the Republic of Gotland, and Søren Norby, including the Visby burghers.

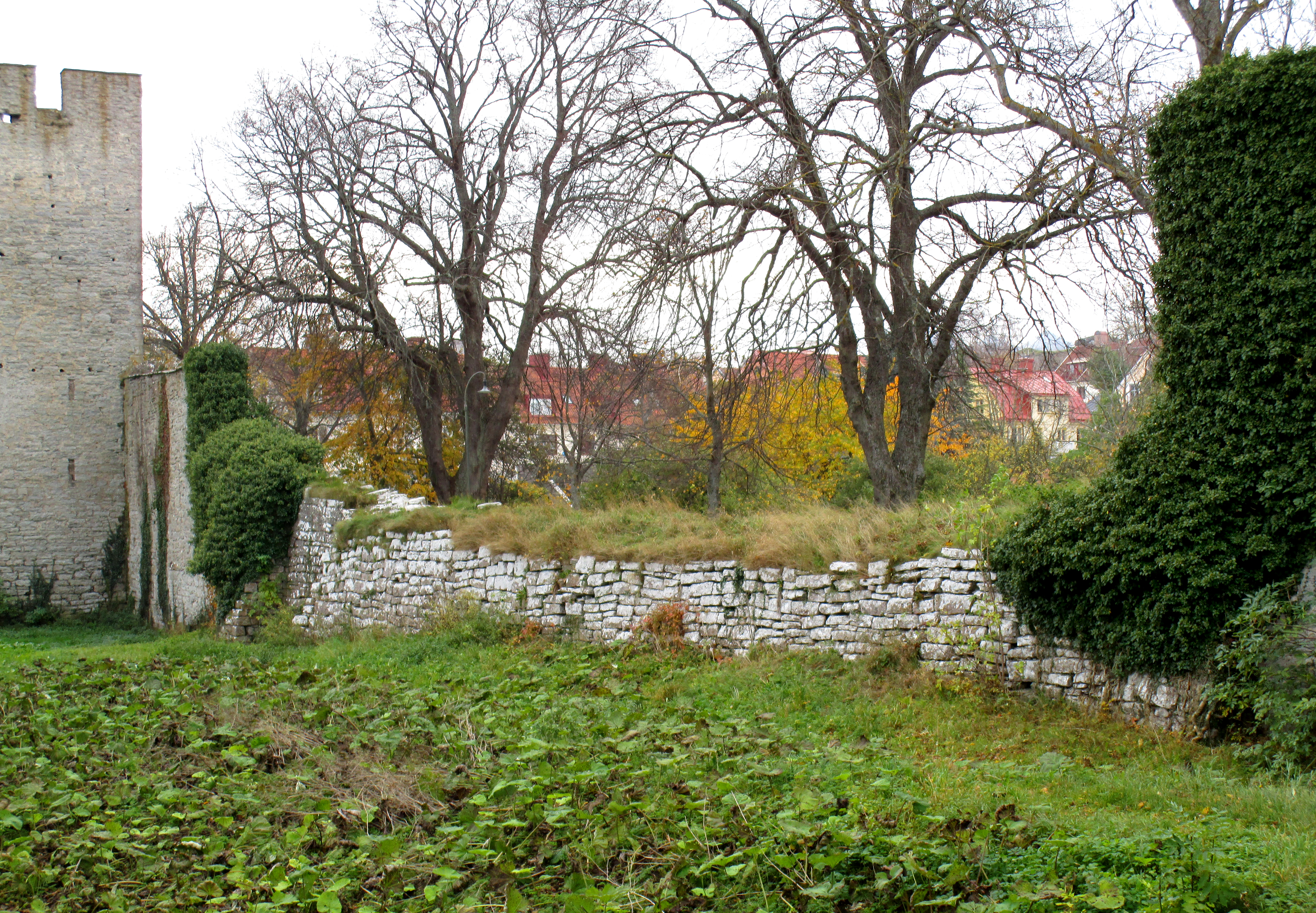
Lübeckerbräschen

The memories of the War in Gotland in 1288 and the killings of many Gotlandic peasants in 1361 remained in the heads of the Gutes, and it was very likely that they supported the Lübeckian entry into Visby. The tradition claims that the Lübeck army entered Visby by tearing down part of the wall between Snäckgärdsporten and Långe Henrik, which is known as "Lübeckerbräschen".

The defenders of the city are said to have set it on fire in four different places to delay the attack, and so that they would have time to take shelter behind the walls of Visborg. The Lübeckians looted and continued burned large parts of the city, three churches were also destroyed from fire, these being St. Nicolai, St. Gertrude, and Helgeand, which were all located in the northern parts of Visby. It is also said that the Lübeckers looted and set fire to the town hall, they are also said to have seized or destroyed Visby's city privileges. However, Visborg did not capitulate, as it was defended fiercely by Søren's commandant, Otto Ulefeld.

== Aftermath ==
After the war, Gotland was not considered to have been very independent, neither Visby or the countryside, it also marked the end of Visby's so-called "greatness".
