= War in Gotland (1288) =

Conflict between peasants and burghers

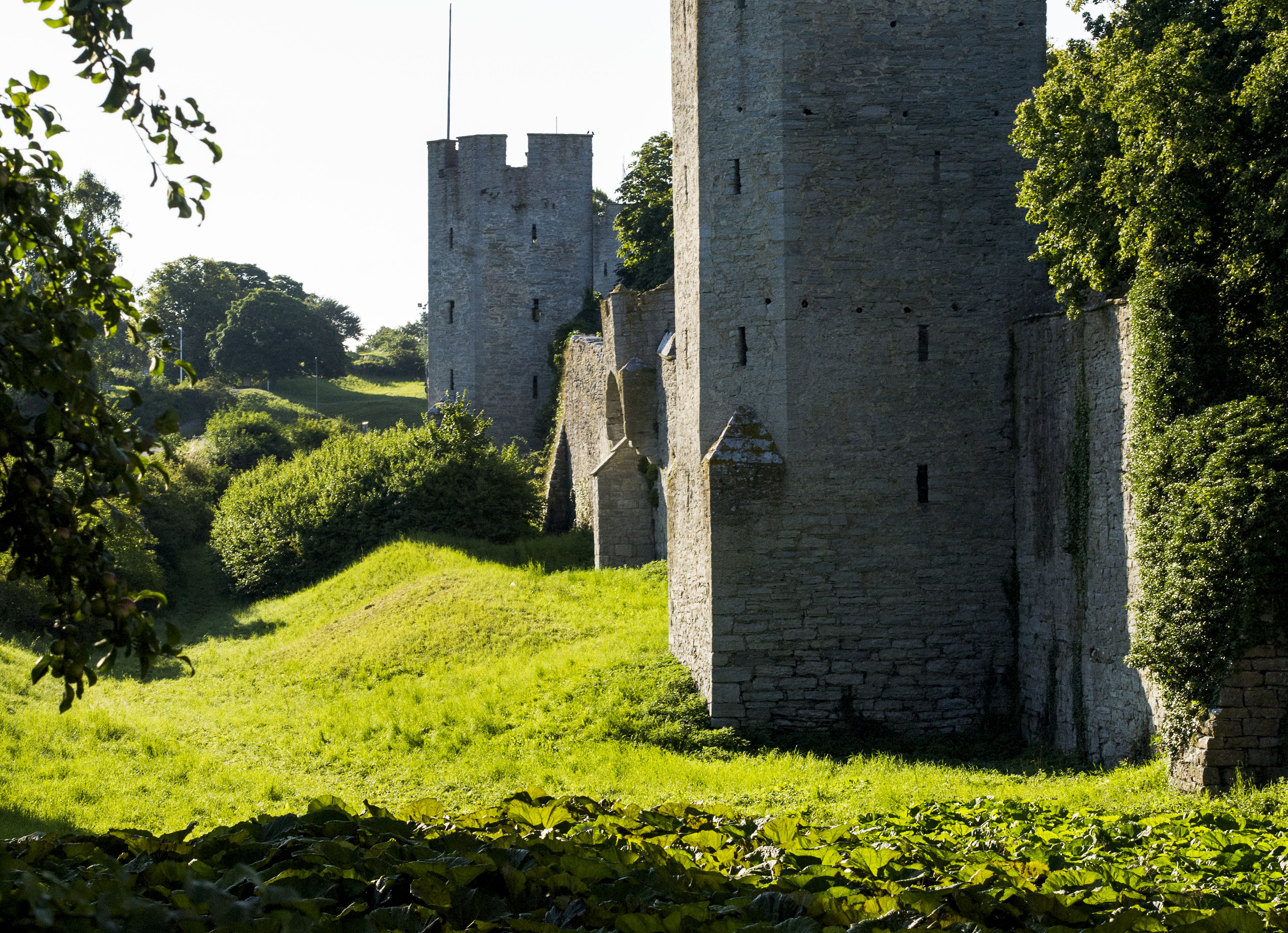
- City wall of Visby
Date	1288
Location	Gotland
Result	Treaty of Gotland, see result
Territorial changes	Status quo ante bellum:

Belligerents
Visby	Gotlandic peasants Sweden; Livonian Order

Commanders and leaders
Unknown	Magnus Ladulås

Strength
Unknown	Unknown

Casualties and losses
Heavy	Heavy

The War in Gotland was an armed conflict between the rural farmers of the island of Gotland and the burghers of its town of Visby; two battles were fought, one at Högebro, at which the burghers emerged victorious and Roma, in which neither side won. However, the war concluded with the Treaty of Gotland which was mediated by King Magnus Ladulås.

== Background ==
In order to prevent the peasants on Gotland from trading in Visby, the burghers of the city constructed a ring wall around it, and the wall was the main casus belli for the peasants. The peasants asked the German military leader in Livonia for help; he and a few knights are said to have traveled to Gotland to help the peasants.

=== Prelude ===
Possibly with support from Livonian knights, the peasants armed themselves marched toward Visby, planning to attack it. In response, the burghers of Visby also mobilized their forces.

== War ==
The peasant's assault surprised Visby's defenders, and once they entered the city, they plundered it and fled with their booty. The burghers soon organized to counterattack. Visby's forces mainly consisted of well-trained German mercenaries. The two sides eventually met at Högebro; fighting lasting the entire day. The burghers eventually won due to their superior weapons. The peasants were tailed through a forest, resulting in several being taken captive and brought to Sjönem. However, they did not lose hope, and mobilized for another battle.

Roma, Gotland

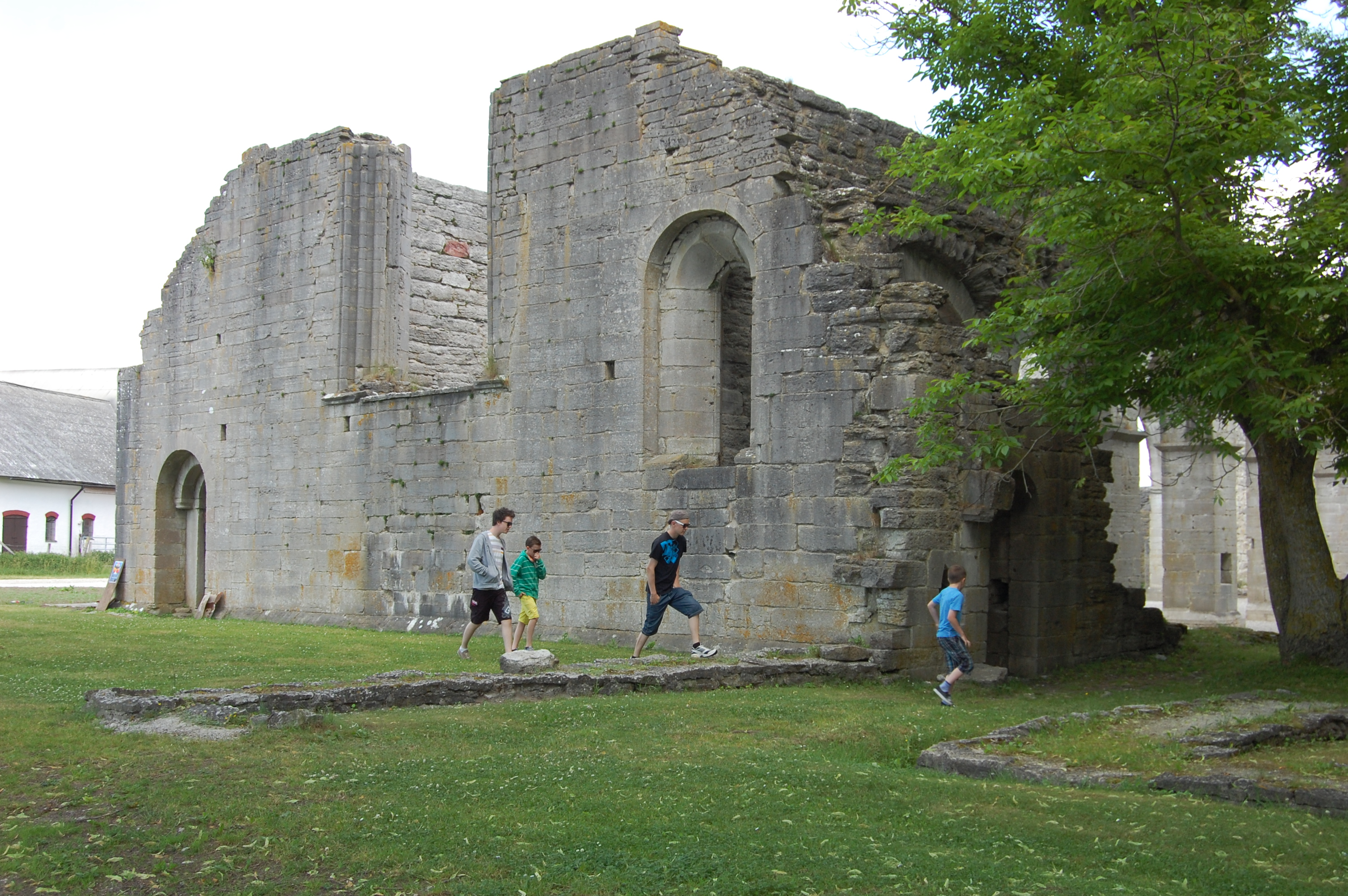
Roma abbey, church ruins

Another battle occurred at Roma Abbey where both sides suffered heavy casualties, but the battle was inconclusive. The priests in Roma Abbey managed to broker a truce after the battle.

However, the peasants withdrew from peace negotiations, but the priests prevented another battle. Finally, it was announced by Bodel Kallin and Gerved of Martebo that Edvard von Lode and several knights wanted to enter the city themselves and confirm the peace. Soon after, news reached king Magnus Ladulås about the events and he sent word that diplomats for both parties should come to him. Magnus also landed troops on the island, taking the side of the peasants.

Magnus Ladulås

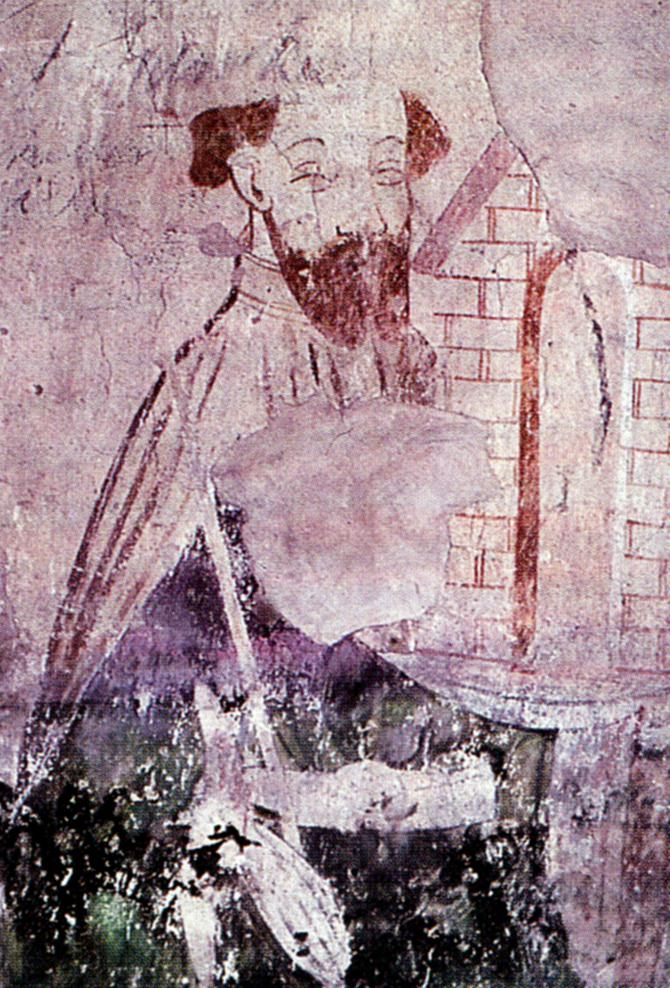
Portrait of Magnus III of Sweden from the 1400s located in Riddarholmskyrkan

== Aftermath ==
In August 1288, representatives from both sides came to Nyköping to negotiate peace. The envoys said that the burghers of Visby had gone against the king's will when they constructed the wall and consequently paid 2,000 marks of silver and 500 marks assorted silver in penance which was all to be paid before Midsummer the following year.

It was also agreed that any later disagreements would be brought up to the Swedish king, before it escalated into hostility against the peasants. However, this was unnecessary if the burghers were forced to reciprocate violence from the peasants.

No complaints would be prevented from reaching the king, and only he would be their master. If the king was ever rejected, Visby would fight the peasants. It was also agreed that Visby would open the gates to the king and give him assistance if the peasants rebelled against him. Additionally, the king split between Visby and the countryside.

=== Result ===
The exact victor in the war is disputed. Historian Mats Adolfsson says that the peasants won the war, while Edward Miller and Christine Peel say that the burghers of Visby won the war. Peel adds how the burghers suffered a humiliating surrender to the king.

== See also ==
- War in Gotland (disambiguation)
