= Visby City Wall =

- Visby ringmur, Visby stadsmur (Swedish)
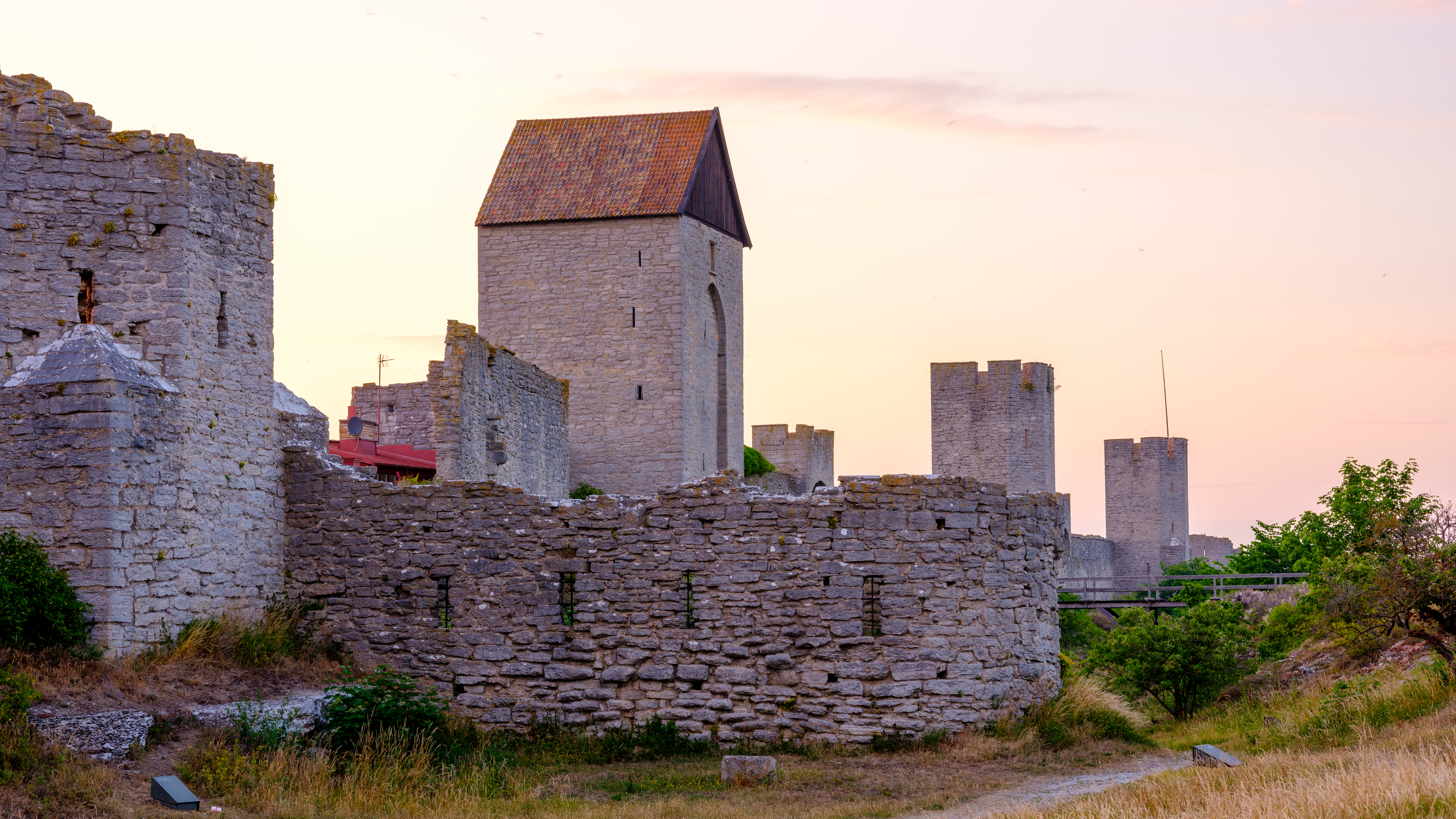
- City Wall in June 2026
- Interactive map of Visby City Wall
- 57°38′05″N 18°17′57″E
- Location: Visby, Sweden

History
- Founded: 12th century
- Built for: Defense for the Town of Visby

Site notes
- Area: Length 3.44 km (2.14 mi)
- Architectural style: Medieval city wall
- Restored: 1884–86 and some subsequent
- Restored by: Emil Victor Langlet (in 1884)
- Governing body: Swedish National Heritage Board
- Owner: Gotland Municipality
- Visitors: 800,000 (in 2013)

UNESCO World Heritage Site
- Type: Cultural
- Criteria: iv, v
- Designated: 1995 (19th session)
- Part of: Hanseatic Town of Visby
- Reference no.: 731
- Europe and North America
- whc.unesco.org

Visby City Wall (Swedish: Visby ringmur, "Visby Ring Wall", sometimes Visby stadsmur, "Visby City Wall") is a medieval defensive wall surrounding the Swedish town of Visby on the island of Gotland. As the strongest, most extensive, and best preserved medieval city wall in Scandinavia, the wall forms an important and integral part of Visby World Heritage Site.

Built in two stages during the 13th and 14th century, approximately 3.44 km (2.14 mi) of its original 3.6 km (2.2 mi) still stands. Of the 29 large and 22 smaller towers, 27 large and 9 small remain. A number of houses that predate the wall were incorporated within it during one of the two phases of construction. During the 18th century, fortifications were added to the wall in several places and some of the towers rebuilt to accommodate cannons.

== History ==
The oldest part of the city wall is a defensive tower, today called the Kruttornet (the Gunpowder Tower), which was erected at the harbor entrance in the 12th century, making it the oldest surviving non-religious building in the Nordic countries. It was not until the 1270s and 1280s, that the building of a proper defense for the town of Visby started, with the erection of the land-facing wall. This first wall was approximately 5-to-6-metre (16 to 20 ft) tall. On the town-side, the wall had a raised platform for archers with regularly spaced openings for firing arrows while between the narrow openings there were arrowslits. According to dendrochronological examinations, the Österport (the East Gate) was built no earlier than 1286, followed by two more in c. 1289: the Norderport (North Gate) and 1294 the Snäckgärdsporten (the Snäckgärds Gate). Around the 1290s and early 1300s, about 20 large towers were added between the gates.

The construction of the wall was probably connected to conflicts that arose between the town of Visby and the thing or assembly of Gotland, which led to a civil war on the island in 1288. A part of the wall east of Kvarntornet (the Mill Tower) which has been razed possibly dates from the beginning of this war, when Visby was captured and plundered.

Construction of city walls was unusual in Nordic countries during the Middle Ages, and so the construction of the city wall testifies to Visby's commercial importance during this time. In medieval Sweden, only Stockholm, Kalmar and Visby had city walls.

The last major rebuilding of the city wall occurred in the 1350s, when the wall was strengthened and its height increased by an additional 3-to-4-metre (9.8 to 13.1 ft). Its defenses were also augmented with approximately twenty new towers attached to the east part of the wall. When King Valdemar IV of Denmark captured the town in 1361, he ordered a part of the wall to be torn down as a symbolic act. It was done to emblematize the town's subjugation, a practice going back to classical antiquity. The razed part of the wall was rebuilt in 1363. The corner tower known as the Silverhättan (the Silver Cap) probably dates from the period in which Visby belonged to the Teutonic Knights (1398–1408). It is possible that two lesser towers facing the sea, also date from this time. The last great attack on Visby took place in 1525, when troops from Lübeck assaulted the town. The Lübeckerbräschen (the Lübeck Breach) is traditionally assumed to be the visible remains of the troops' breach into the town, but is more likely due to a later collapse of this part of the wall. However, it is in the part of the wall where the troops from Lübeck most probably damaged the town's defenses.

During the 17th and early 18th century, two caponiers were added to the eastern section of the wall. The defensive purpose of the wall had by that time otherwise completely ceased and the wall survived mainly in its capacity as a toll barrier. When domestic tolls were abolished in Sweden in 1810, the city wall was already a known landmark, which guaranteed its survival.

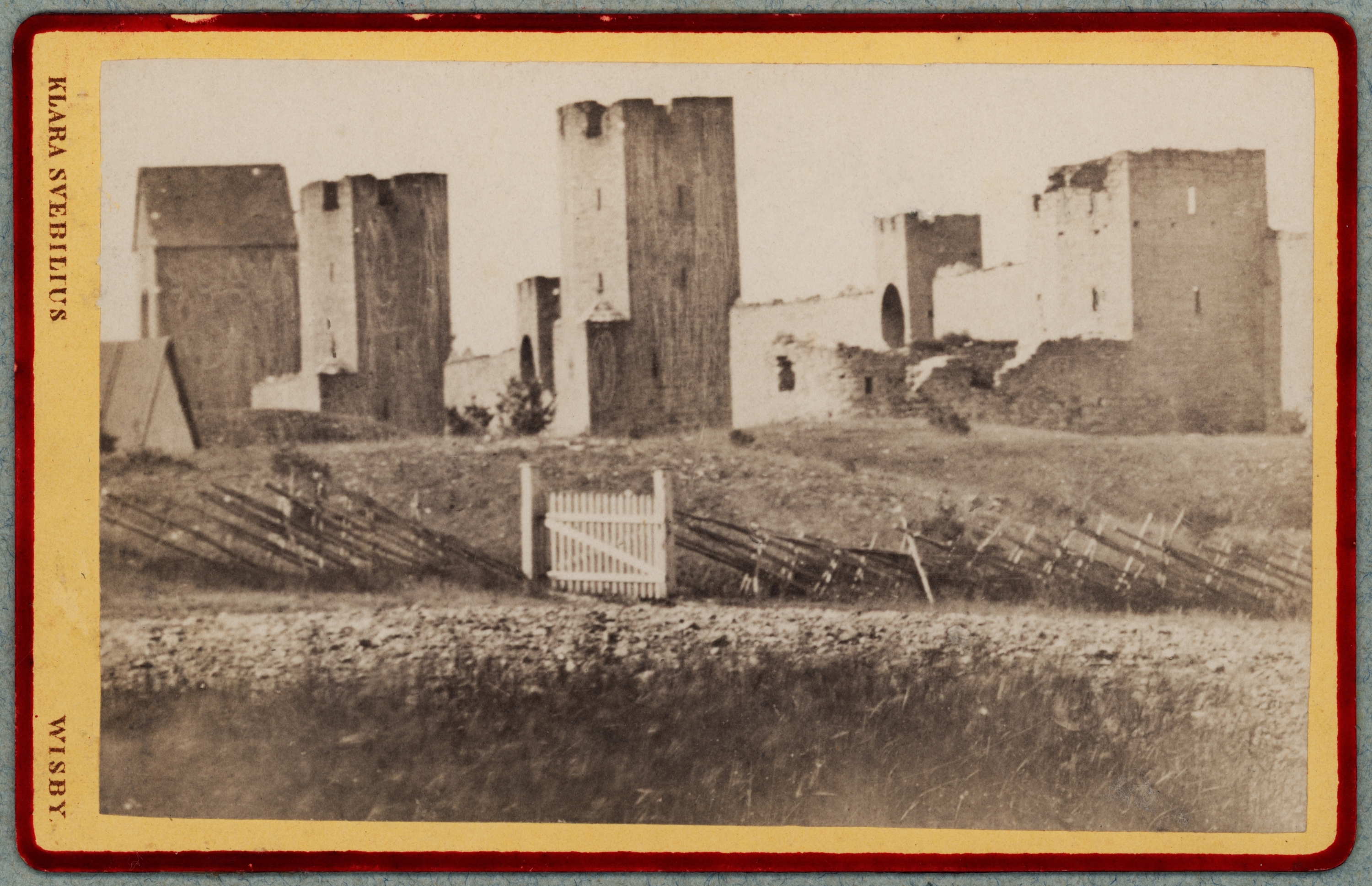
The Northeastern section of the City Wall, photographed in the second half of the 19th century.

The city wall was restored in 1884 to 1886 by architect Emil Victor Langlet.

In 2012, a 10 metres (33 ft) long section of the outer dressing of the wall collapsed. Restoration of the collapsed section began in 2013.

The medieval city wall in Scandinavia and the best preserved. Large parts of the original wall remain intact, and it incorporates the majority of the medieval large full-length towers, so-called "saddle towers" (small towers riding on the wall) and gates. In addition, large parts of the original system of trenches have been preserved outside the wall. The city wall is mostly unencumbered by the presence of modern buildings with very few visible from outside the wall. Taken as a whole, this provides for a uniquely genuine picture of what a medieval city wall was like in its original state.

== Construction ==
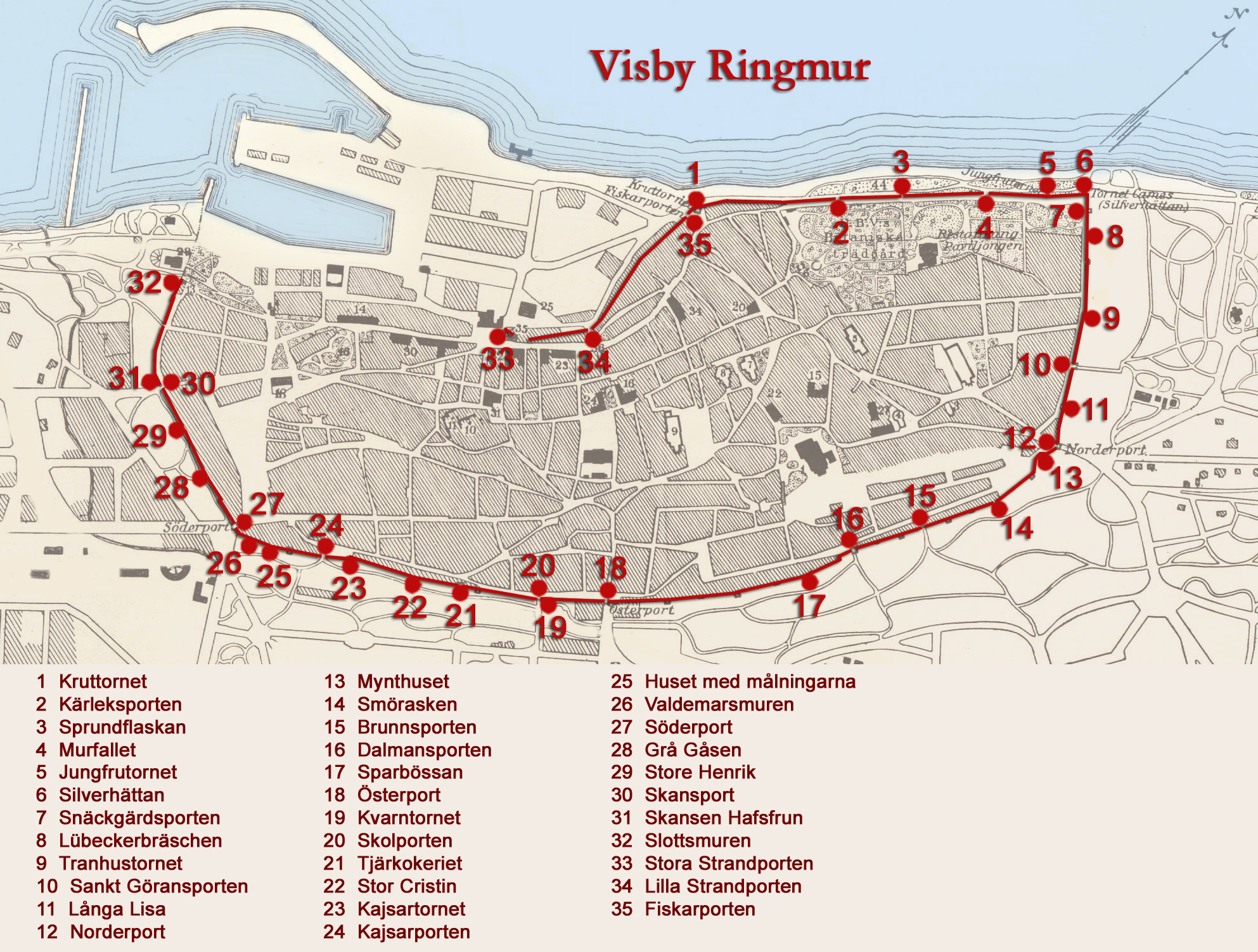
Visby City Wall

The wall was built during two periods, the 13th and the 14th century. It is made from locally quarried limestone, rubble limestone filling, fat lime mortar and clay mortar. The first wall was lower than at present and constructed as two thin walls of solid limestone with rubble used to fill the gap between them. When the height of the wall was increased during the second building phase, solid limestone stabilized with lime mortar was added on top of the first wall. Due to this, most of the weight of the wall is carried by the two thinner outer stone layers of the first wall. The joints of lime mortar in these layers were reinforced with stronger cement during 20th century restorations.

Originally, the wall had 29 large regular towers and 22 small towers riding on top of the wall, 27 of the large and 9 of the small towers remain. It was approximately 3.6 km (2.2 mi), of which 3.44 km (2.14 mi) is still standing.

The wall encloses the old town of Visby which is built on a steep slope facing the Baltic Sea. The west part of the wall nearest the sea, is built on land approximately 2 metres (6.6 ft) above sea level. To the north and south the wall climbs the slope known as the Klinten, towards the east where the highest elevation reaches about 40 metres (130 ft).

== Towers, buildings, gates and parts of the wall ==
Name	Swedish name	Image	Description	Coordinates
The Gunpowder Tower (formerly the Sheep Tower)	Kruttornet (formerly Lambtornet)		Kruttornet is the oldest tower in the city wall of Visby and was built as a defensive tower to protect the medieval harbour, which was located in the part of Visby now known as Almedalen park. It was built in 1160–61, in connection with the conclusion of a trade agreement with the Duke of Saxony as a free-standing defensive tower. Originally an identical tower, which has since disappeared, existed on the opposite side of the harbour entrance. The harbour has also vanished due to post-glacial rebound. From the top of the tower, crossbowmen could shoot straight into approaching ships. The tower had no gate, only a small hatch about 10 metres (33 ft) up the wall, accessible via a removable ladder. This design made it more difficult for an aggressor to gain access to the tower. Its name, literally "the Gunpowder Tower", is of a significantly later date. During the wars with Denmark in 1361 and intermittently from 1394 to 1487, it served as a gunpowder store for both sides, since it was not unusual for the representatives from the town of Visby to change their allegiance.	57°38′31.93″N 18°17′29.07″E
The Love Gate	Kärleksporten		Kärleksporten was built as late as 1872. It was constructed in a section of the wall which had collapsed and was used by local fishermen as a passageway between the Strandpromenaden (the Beach Promenade Road) and the area now known as the Visby Botanical Garden. The wall north of Kruttornet facing the sea, originally lacked towers. The name of the round-arched passageway (literally, the "Love Gate") actually stems from the ropes that were coated with tar on the town-side of the wall during the Middle Ages. The similarly sounding Tjärporten (the Tar Gate) became Kärleksporten. According to tradition, couples who pass through the gate should stop here and kiss each other. There are numerous romantic inscriptions on the stones of the gate.	57°38′38.24″N 18°17′34.62″E
The Slit Bottle	Sprundflaskan		Sprundflaskan. This full-length tower was erected at either the end of the 14th century or at the beginning of the 15th, with the dual purpose of strengthening the town defences and reinforcing a weak spot in the wall. Its present name has been used since the 17th century and possibly stems from the tower resembling a bottle.	57°38′46.46″N 18°17′44.21″E
The Fallen Wall	Murfallet		Murfallet. As indicated by its name, this is a collapsed part of the wall, which may also contain traces of an earlier tower. On the sea side of the wall, a small hill may contain the remains of the collapsed wall. As of 2014 it is used as a passageway for cars.	57°38′47.29″N 18°17′45.09″E
The Maiden Tower	Jungfrutornet		Jungfrutornet was erected during the 15th century to improve the town's defenses against attackers coming from the sea. According to tradition its name is derived from the legend of the daughter of Nils Guldsmed from Unghanse, Öja in the south part of Gotland. She was supposed to have been immured in the wall as punishment for betraying the town by letting King Valdemar IV of Denmark and his Danish troops into Visby during the campaign of 1361. Recent research has established that the tower did not exist at that time. It is more plausible that the name derives from a unit of measurement known as the jungfru (8.2 centilitres (2.9 imp fl oz; 2.8 US fl oz)).	57°38′47.75″N 18°17′45.57″E
The Silver Cap/Kames	Silverhättan/Kames		Silverhättan or Kames is the most recent tower of the city wall of Visby, built by the Teutonic Knights who ruled Gotland between 1398 and 1408. The name Kames dates from the 17th century and stems from the Latin word comes, meaning count. Its alternate name, the Silverhättan (the Silver Cap), stems from an earlier silver-coloured roof, probably made of lead. The tower forms part of the most recently erected group of defensive towers and is placed at an angle between the part of the wall facing the sea and the part facing land. It is supported by two large buttresses. At the top of the tower, on the third floor outside, there was originally a wooden gallery for archers. On the same floor there was also a place where a fire could be lit, mainly used for signalling purposes. In the beginning of the 18th century during the Great Northern War, the arrow-slits were enlarged. It was feared that the Russian military, which had earlier ravaged the eastern coast of the island, would attack Visby. The governor and major general Anders Sparfeldt equipped parts of the city wall, the towers and the gate towers, with firearms. The Silver Cap was a northern outpost and the strategically located tower served as key fortification for securing the beach along the part of the wall facing the sea.	57°38′48.23″N 18°17′45.99″E
The Snäckgärds Gate	Snäckgärdsporten		Snäckgärdsporten has been known by many names throughout history, among them the Västerport (the West Gate). It is one of the oldest gate towers of the wall. During the 18th century, the gate was blocked up and not opened again until 1885, in connection with reconstruction works. From the 1840s and a few decades on, the gate room itself was used as part of an establishment serving coffee, tea and punsch. The gate itself has slots for a portcullis. This served as a protection against hostile assaults with weapons such as battering rams. In addition to an extra set of internal walls, this provided a good defence for the relative weak spots that the gates were. In 2009, new internal, wooden floors and stairs were built in the tower, which became a new observation point in the town. The tower is accessed from the inside of the wall via a walkway and a ladder from the Silverhättan.	57°38′47.92″N 18°17′47.45″E
The Lübeck Breach	Lübeckerbräschen		Lübeckerbräschen is the name of a partially collapsed section of the northern wall. It is possible that it was here that Lübeck forces assaulted the town in 1525. A number of arrowheads have been found here during archaeological excavations. At the time of the assault, a significant part of Visby was burnt to the ground, and churches and monasteries plundered. Many of these were never rebuilt and as of 2014, Visby hosts a large number of church ruins. Recent research indicates that the collapse of the wall was unconnected to the assault in 1525; but the location may coincide with the place of the attack. On the razed part of the wall, there was a small tower riding on the wall which, when it collapsed, pulled a substantial part of the wall down with it. That part of the wall was erected on unstable ground and this may have caused the foundation of the wall to move, prompting the collapse.	57°38′47.26″N 18°17′49.17″E
The Fish oil Tower	Tranhustornet		Tranhustornet. The so-called Fish oil Tower is a ground tower which lies east of the Lübeckerbräschen. On a map from the 18th century, the tower is marked as a place for extracting oil from fish, hence the name. To the east of the tower there lies a stone house which is older than the city wall.	57°38′45.06″N 18°17′55.29″E
The Saint George Gate	Sankt Göransporten		Sankt Göransporten. The road from this gate leads from the town centre towards the now ruined Saint George's almshouse and church. Outside the gate, a bridge spans the Nordergravar (the North Trenches), a part of the medieval defence system. In old documents, the gate is called the Andre Lång Henrik (the Second Tall Henry) and this may have been the medieval name for it. During the 19th century it was known as the Ödeporten (the Abandoned Gate) and at the beginning of the 20th century it began to be known by its present name. Its construction can be connected with the construction of the aforementioned almshouse and church, which was a large medieval complex for lepers. In the middle of the 18th century, the gate was blocked up, possibly in connection with the installing of a fireplace in the tower. The fireplace was used for boiling tar for a rope manufacturer on the town-side of the wall. The gate tower has been subject to attack by a siege engine as is evident by a catapult stone still stuck in one of the arrow-slits on the fourth floor. The bridge leading from the tower across the trench was rebuilt in 1901. On the wall on both sides of the gate, traces of collapsed small towers perching on the wall can be seen.	57°38′43.37″N 18°17′58.52″E
Tall Lisa	Långa Lisa		Långa Lisa with its six storeys is the tallest tower of the wall. The tower has retained its original, medieval name. During an examination of the tower in 1901, a number of catapult stones were found in the niches on the upper floors. They were part of the tower's arsenal.	57°38′41.70″N 18°18′01.03″E
The North Gate	Norderport		Norderport is one of the oldest towers in the city wall and was the main entrance to the town for people and goods from the north part of the island. Originally, there was only a simple gate in the wall. The original slot for the toll barrier, dressed with wood, is still visible. The gate entrance was probably rebuilt when the tower was erected. Norderport and Österport are the oldest gate towers of the wall, probably built shortly after the erection of the first wall, possibly as early as 1280. Norderport lies on a steep slope. It was stoutly built, and hence had good defensive capacity. The outer, wooden gates were reinforced with a portcullis. Openings for chains and ropes to pull it up still exist. Through other openings, water could be poured onto the portcullis if an enemy attempted to set it on fire. In the outermost wall posts, iron rings are attached. These were probably used to secure a chain that could be stretched across the gate entrance. During times of peace, the gates were normally open and the entrance only blocked by the chain. The rooms above the gate contained a fireplace, which proves that the gate could have been permanently manned throughout the winter. On several of the floors, the arrow-slits have been widened to accommodate cannons. This was done in 1710. At the top of the tower, there are traces of an external wooden gallery for archers. In the 17th century, a fire consumed all wooden parts of the wall from Norderport to Silverhättan. As of 2014 the gate is one of the few which can be used by cars.	57°38′40.56″N 18°18′03.20″E
The Coin House	Mynthuset		Mynthuset ("Mint House"). Despite its name, there is no evidence that this building ever functioned as a mint. The name more likely comes from the Swedish word for coin. The northern and eastern wall of the building form an integral part of the city wall, suggesting that the building was present before the wall was constructed. Dendrochronological examinations have shown that the building was built circa 1225, and probably incorporated into the wall in the 1280s. It was probably used as a building for collecting toll, which the name, location and the fact that the building is older than the wall, indicates. It is also possible that it has been used for storage. It is aligned diagonally, in relation to the wall. Because of its location, it was difficult to build the wall in front of it. Instead, the building was incorporated into the wall, strengthened and turned into one of the wall towers. It has three floors. On the north gable of the house, the blocked up openings for bringing goods in and out are still visible. The southern and western walls have disappeared, following a devastating fire.	57°38′38.61″N 18°18′04.56″E
The Butter Box	Smörasken		Smörasken is one of two caponiers (the other being the Sparbössan) built in the 16th century with the purpose of being able to supply flanking fire in the defence of the wall. They are both connected to full-length towers. Both are semi-circular fortifications projecting from the wall. In this arrangement, the military doctrines of two separate ages met: firearms and crossbows. Crossbowmen guarded the high, inaccessible tower against soldiers with firearms. The introduction of firearms risked making the wall more vulnerable, and hence the caponiers were introduced. They made it possible to provide enfilade cannon fire parallel with the wall. The caponiers had three floors, a low cellar and above two artillery decks. The name Smörasken is known since 1723.	57°38′36.47″N 18°18′05.13″E
The Well Gate	Brunnsporten		Brunnsporten. The town of Visby inside the wall has always had a shortage of water, with only a few wells. In 1863, a well was dug in the Östergravar (the East Trenches) outside the eastern part of the wall. At the same time the gate was constructed to facilitate access to the well. When the gate was made, the design for it was taken from gates and churches on the island and thereby giving it a shape different from all the other gates in the wall.	57°38′33.04″N 18°18′03.29″E
The Dalman Tower	Dalmanstornet		Dalmanstornet was built as a gate tower for a gate in the earliest wall. The name refers to one of the vice governors of Gotland, L. R. Dalman. On the town-side of the wall, there have been parallel defensive walls that strengthened the gate and increased its defensive capacity. On the outer façade, above the original gate vault, there are remains of a niche intended to house the statuette of a saint or a coat of arms. At some point in time, this decorative element was probably removed to a place above the portcullis. The barrel vaulted room in the tower has benches, and in an upper floor room there is a fireplace with a chimney that leads to the top of the tower. Because of its height, the tower (circa 17 metres (56 ft)) was used as a navigational aid for ships sailing to Visby. In 1784, the tower was converted into a granary. At the same time, the open side towards the town was blocked up and the tower received its current roof.	57°38′29.53″N 18°18′01.75″E
The Money Box	Sparbössan		Sparbössan This caponier was built in the trench below Dalmanstornet in the middle of the 16th century. From the 1830s to 1900, the area in front of it was used as a shooting range, and the wall of the caponier still carries marks of rifle fire.	57°38′27.23″N 18°18′02.04″E
The East Gate	Österport		Österport was the gate for the road leading to eastern and central Gotland. It was possibly an important communications route from the outset of habitation in Visby. Over the old gate a five floor tower was erected. Three of the floors lacked openings towards the town. In the room above the gate, there was both a fireplace and a privy, which shows that the gate was permanently manned. As of 2014 the surface of the road through the gate is circa 1 metre (3.3 ft) higher than when the gate was constructed, as layers of road surface have been successively added. In the 17th century, the gate tower's outer defenses were still preserved. These consisted of two parallel walls running circa 25 metres (82 ft) out from the city wall at an angle, thus providing protection for the gates and the bridges crossing the trenches. In 1873, the wooden gates themselves were still preserved in the Norder-, Söder- and Österport. As of 2014 the original gates from the Österport are preserved and on display in the courtyard of the Gotland Museum. All announcements by the magistrate and other official notices were displayed on the town gates and in the Stora Torget (the Main Square) until 1811, when the island's first newspaper (Wisby Tidning) was started. During the turbulent times of the 1710s, the tower was armed with cannons. In a Danish account from 1633 (Hans Nielssön Strelow's Chronica Guthilandorum), it is claimed that the Österport used to have a "beautiful spire", which was destroyed in a fire in 1610. As of 2014 the gate is open for pedestrians. Outside the gate lies a shopping mall, built in the 1970s.	57°38′18.41″N 18°17′53.95″E
The Mill Tower	Kvarntornet		Kvarntornet. The tower's name is known since the early 17th century. A Danish historian visiting the town wrote in 1753–54 that the tower consisted of three floors which were full of rotary querns turned by hand, that were used by the maids of the town burghers to grind malt and grain. Medieval city wall towers with similar uses are known from several German cities, e.g. Rothenburg ob der Tauber and Dinkelsbühl. During the 19th century, snus was produced in a small factory established in the tower. The tower is semi-circular, which is unusual for Visby but common in the Baltic states. The tower was built as part of the first, lower wall and was kept intact when the height of the wall was later increased. Except for the Söderport, no other tower in the wall has such well-made stonework as the Kvarntornet. Inside the tower, openings to a former archer's gallery are still visible. The tower originally had five floors and an upper part with battlements. Originally, the side of the tower facing the town was completely open, and a wall covering that side was added later. The roof dates from the 18th century. On the tower façade, two stones that have been shattered by cannonballs are still visible.	57°38′15.19″N 18°17′51.00″E
The School Gate	Skolporten		Skolporten. A small gate was made in this part of the wall to facilitate coming and going to the school, when a primary school was built outside the wall in 1891. It has since been enlarged several times and the wall has partially collapsed in this area. As of 2014 it is one of the gates which cars are allowed to pass through. The school, now known as Solbergaskolan, is still located outside the gate.	57°38′15.53″N 18°17′50.52″E
The Tar Boiler's House	Tjärkokeriet		Tjärkokeriet This is a small house which has been built into the wall. During one period, tar was being manufactured in the house, hence its name. The tar was used for impregnating rope, manufactured in the town. The house was built before the wall, probably as a warehouse. It was incorporated with the earliest wall, enlarged and eventually turned into a defensive tower. The rectangular building has a cellar, and above it a single room divided into two compartments and supported by a barrel vault. The main entrance has been walled up. Traces of it can still be seen on the southern façade, on the part of the building that is on the outside of the wall. There is an opening above the entrance on the side of the house facing from the wall and into the town; this may have served as the gate for bringing goods into and out of the building. The shingle roof probably dates from the time when the building was used as a tar manufacture. The building and the adjacent wall were possibly razed in 1449, when the forces belonging to Eric of Pomerania was fighting a besieging Swedish army. Eric of Pomerania fired at the Swedish army with cannons from Visborg Castle. The Swedish army was camped nearby, close to the (now vanished) church dedicated to Saint Michael. According to contemporaneous reports, many of the Swedish soldiers were killed, and the church was severely damaged. It is possible that the wall was substantially damaged during the fighting.	57°38′10.92″N 18°17′43.07″E
Big Cristin	Stor Cristin		Stor Cristin is one of the larger towers in the wall although little is known about its history. The name is probably medieval and on a map made in 1690, it is also the name of the adjacent property.	57°38′12.68″N 18°17′45.71″E
The Kajsar Tower	Kajsartornet		Kajsartornet When the first phase of building the wall was almost finished, the full-length towers were added. The first was the Kajsartornet or simply the Kajsarn. Its name is known since 1750, but may be older, and refers to the Swedish word for Emperor (kejsare). The tower is square shaped and the main part of the building is on the outside of the wall. Like the Kruttornet, this tower has originally been without openings and seems to have been used mainly for storage. With its 2.6 metres (8.5 ft) thick walls and unusual height, it was the strongest tower in the eastern part of the wall and equal to the Kruttornet in the west. It may have served as the town's central weapons storage. The original round-arched entrance to the ground floor is still visible in the west façade. The tower originally had four floors and was thus higher. The top floor was most likely open on the town-side and had a gallery for archers. Two of the three upper floors can be reached via an external staircase. The tower later served as the town prison. The alleged witch and cunning woman Brita Biörn was imprisoned there in 1738. The earliest records of this are from the 1680s. In 1782 a purpose-built county prison was built south of the tower, since the Kajsarn was considered too primitive and small at that time when more humanistic ideas of penal organization began to spread. The county prison was connected to the tower, and it was demolished in 1886. Traces of it can still be seen on the town-side of the wall. As of 2014 it houses a prison museum.	57°38′08.79″N 18°17′38.77″E
The Kajsar Gate	Kajsarporten		Kajsarporten. The gate is named after the adjacent Kajsartornet and is as of 2014 one of the gates that cars are allowed to use. The gate was originally known as the Maria Bönderbys port, i.e. the Gate of Maria Bönderby. It was constructed in 1661.	57°38′07.91″N 18°17′36.89″E
The House with the Paintings	Huset med målningarna		Huset med målningarna is one of the oldest houses in Visby. It was built in the middle of the 13th century, predating the wall and was consequently included in it when it was erected. According to tradition, the house served as lodging for guests of the Solberga Abbey. During the 14th century it was one of the houses in the part of town where the poor people lived, and during the 1600s it housed craftsmen and merchants. Since the 1800s, merchants have used the house and as of 2014 the house is mainly used for storage. The walls and the vaulted ceiling of the upper floor are covered with renaissance paintings. The house is accessed through the cellar on the town-side of the wall. Doors and openings on the east and north side of the façade indicates that the house once had external, wooden stairs or ladders up to a wooden landing outside the first floor and onwards up to the attic. The cellar also holds an old disused well.	57°38′06.67″N 18°17′35.03″E
The Valdemars Wall	Valdemarsmuren		Valdemarsmuren is a part of the wall which has been damaged and rebuilt at some unknown point in time. The crest of the wall is different from other while original parts of the wall and this section also lack arrow slits. According to legend, it is the part of the wall which King Valdemar IV of Denmark and his troops tore down, and marched through the breach thirteen men abreast, when they entered Visby in 1361. Later research has shown that the wall has not been completely demolished to ground level. On the town-side of the wall, the ground-level arches of the original wall are still untouched.	57°38′05.66″N 18°17′32.85″E
The South Gate	Söderport		Söderport. This gate is located in the corner of the wall where the southern and eastern sections meet. Its name is probably medieval and can be found on the oldest preserved town maps of Visby. The wooden outer gate was preserved in its original place until 1873. No traces of an earlier gate have been found, and hence it is assumed that the gate tower of Söderport dates from a later time. In contrast with the other gate towers, this one is delicately constructed with very thin joints. The walls of the tower are only preserved as high as 6.5 metres (21 ft). The ground surrounding the tower has not been raised since the construction of the gate, and thus it has retained its original proportions. The tower has a room with stone benches and a ceiling supported by a groin vault. There are two niches in the room, one of which contains a heavily eroded sculptured double face, the only decorative element of the gate. On the second floor, only the southern wall has survived. Originally, there was a room with a fireplace here. During an archaeological examination in 1902, a number of objects were found that had belonged to the gate's arsenal. The objects, arrowheads and parts of firearms, where found in a part of the tower which had suffered a fire. The objects date from medieval times to the early 17th century. The traces of fire can possibly be connected to a fire in 1611, which devastated parts of the town and city wall. In 1947, due to the increase in traffic, two smaller openings for pedestrians were made in the wall on both sides of the tower. The main road to the southern part of Gotland passed through this gate.	57°38′04.96″N 18°17′30.30″E
The Grey Goose	Grå Gåsen		Grå Gåsen and the Store Henrik are the lowest of the full-length towers of the wall. They both reach circa 12–13 metres (39–43 ft), as opposed to the 16–23 metres (52–75 ft) of the majority of the towers. The names of both towers are probably their original names. In 1726 to 1887, the area inside the wall between these towers were used as military proving grounds and the two towers was rebuilt for storage.	57°38′05.07″N 18°17′25.56″E
Big Henry	Store Henrik		Store Henrik This and the other full-length towers along the southern part of the wall were the first purely defensive towers to be added to the wall. In certain aspects they also differ from the other towers of the wall, they have been placed quite squarely on the wall, with one side also protruding towards the town-side. Towers were later built in line with the wall, with only the front façade facing the outside, protruding beyond the line of the wall. The towers along the southern stretch are also more stocky in character and display more Romanesque elements.	57°38′05.43″N 18°17′20.84″E
The Sconce Gate	Skansport		Skansport is named after the adjacent sconce Skansen Hafsfrun, which was built in 1712. This passage was opened in 1879, partially to allow horse-drawn artillery to be deployed outside the city more rapidly, and partly to ameliorate the communications with the southern suburbs of Visby. Cars are allowed to pass through this gate.	57°38′05.06″N 18°17′16.53″E
The Sea-maiden (Rán) Sconce	Skansen Hafsfrun		Skansen Hafsfrun is a sconce which is not part of the original wall. It was built outside, but connected to, the wall in the beginning of the 1700s, as a platform for cannons. Neither the sconce nor the cannons were ever used in any wartime activity. Eight cannons were placed at the sconce to defend the harbor and the south part of the wall. This was done at the same time as the Silverhättan, Norderport and Österport were supplied with cannons and artillery.	57°38′05.07″N 18°17′15.46″E
The Castle Wall	Slottsmuren		Slottsmuren. Located in the south-western corner of the wall was originally a tower called the Segeltornet (the Sail Tower). The remaining foundations of the tower show that it was stronger than the other towers along the southern part of the wall. Like the Kruttornet, the Segeltornet lacked openings facing the town. A flanking wall went from the tower down the slope to the sea, prohibiting passage on the outside of the part of the wall facing the sea. Next to the remains of the Segeltornet, parts of that wall and a gate in the earliest wall remain. This gate also served as a passage between the inner courtyard of the Visborg Castle and the outer defensive structures.	57°38′08.90″N 18°17′10.17″E
The Large Beach Gate	Stora Strandporten		Stora Strandporten, also known as the Donnersporten (the Donner Gate). There are no visible remains of the original Large Beach Gate, the foundation of which were found during an archeological excavation in 1989. The west part of the wall facing the sea is called the Sea Wall. Part of that wall is incorporated into the town-side façade of the Donnerska Huset (the Donner House) south of the gate. The original gate was probably still standing in 1710. The new gate was built during the restoration of the adjacent house in 1810.	57°38′21.19″N 18°17′28.04″E
The Small Beach Gate	Lilla Strandporten		Lilla Strandporten is one of the oldest gates in the wall. It was part of the first wall and was rebuilt during the 1200s. On top of the gate, the height of the wall is increased and the original arrow slits have been closed up. It was one of the most important gates during the early Middle Ages since it connected the old harbor (now known as the Almedalen park due to the isostasy and landfill) with the Rolandstorget (the Roland's Square) where the town's first city hall was situated.	57°38′24.62″N 18°17′32.46″E
The Fisherman's Gate	Fiskarporten		Fiskarporten lies next to the Kruttornet. It was built during the later part of the Middle Ages, probably in the 15th century. It led to a small fishing harbor which may have been adjacent to the main harbor. As of 2014 it is used as a passageway for cars.	57°38′31.50″N 18°17′28.69″E

== Other features ==
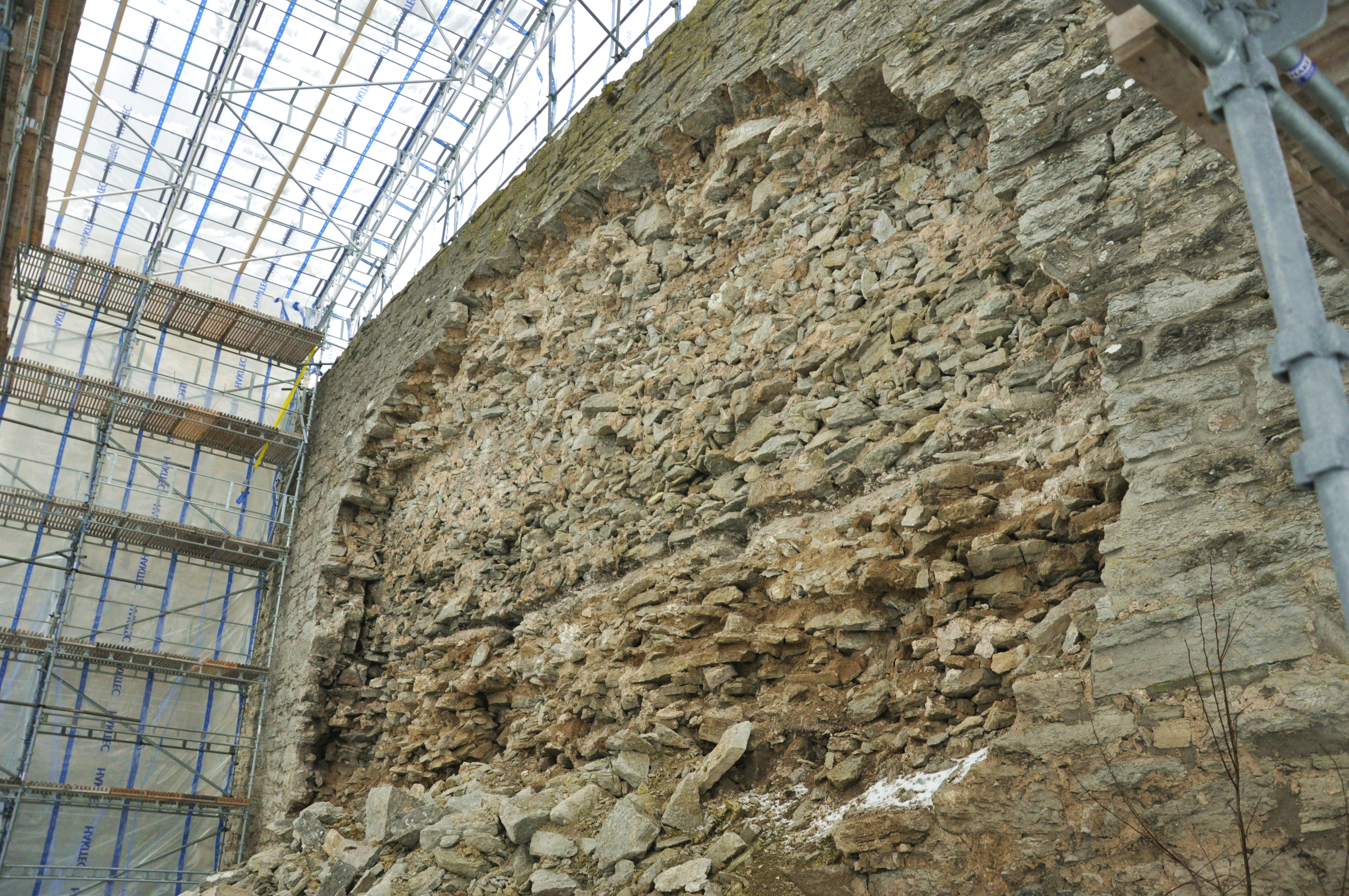
Renovating the collapsed part of the wall in 2013

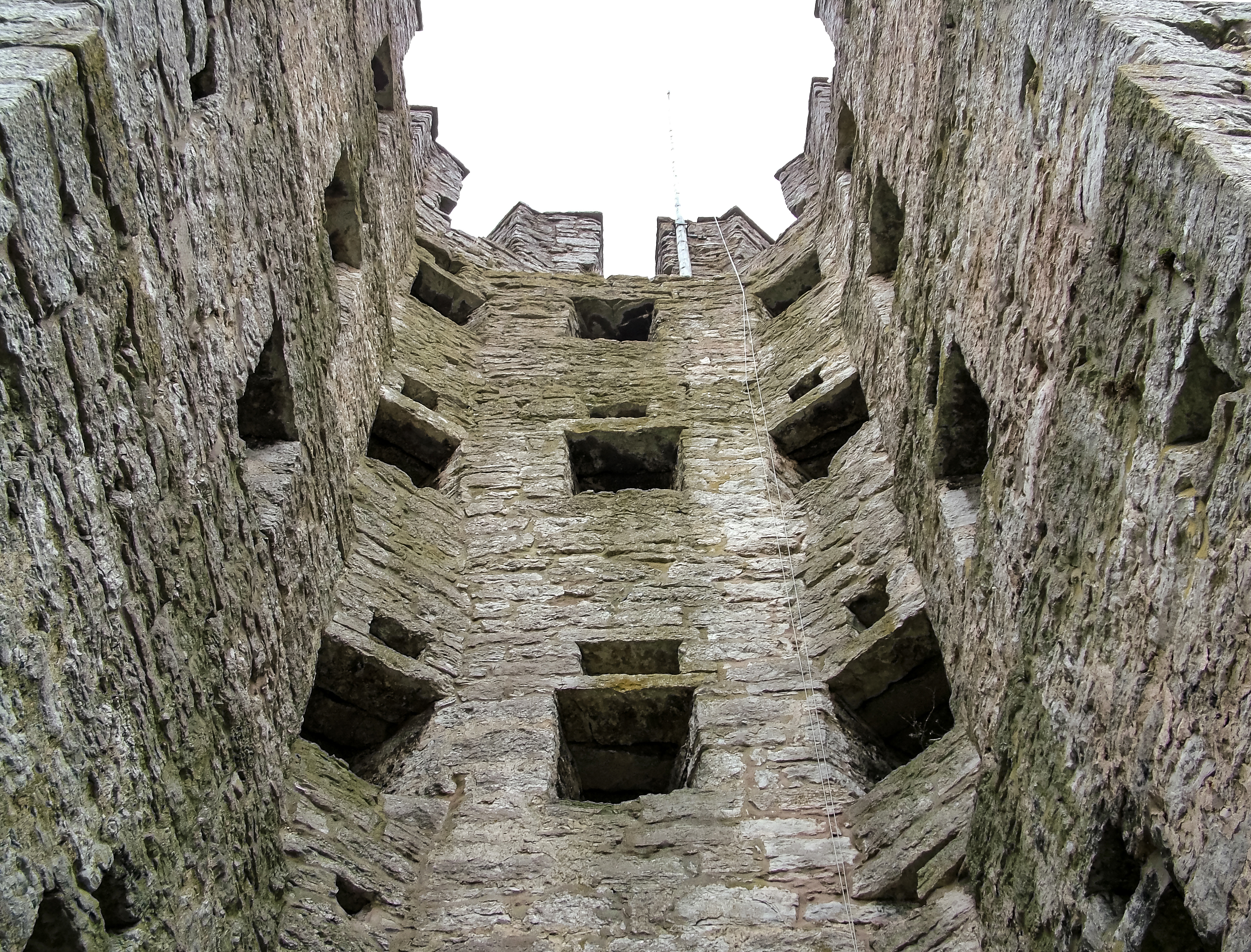
Inside the Tall Lisa Tower

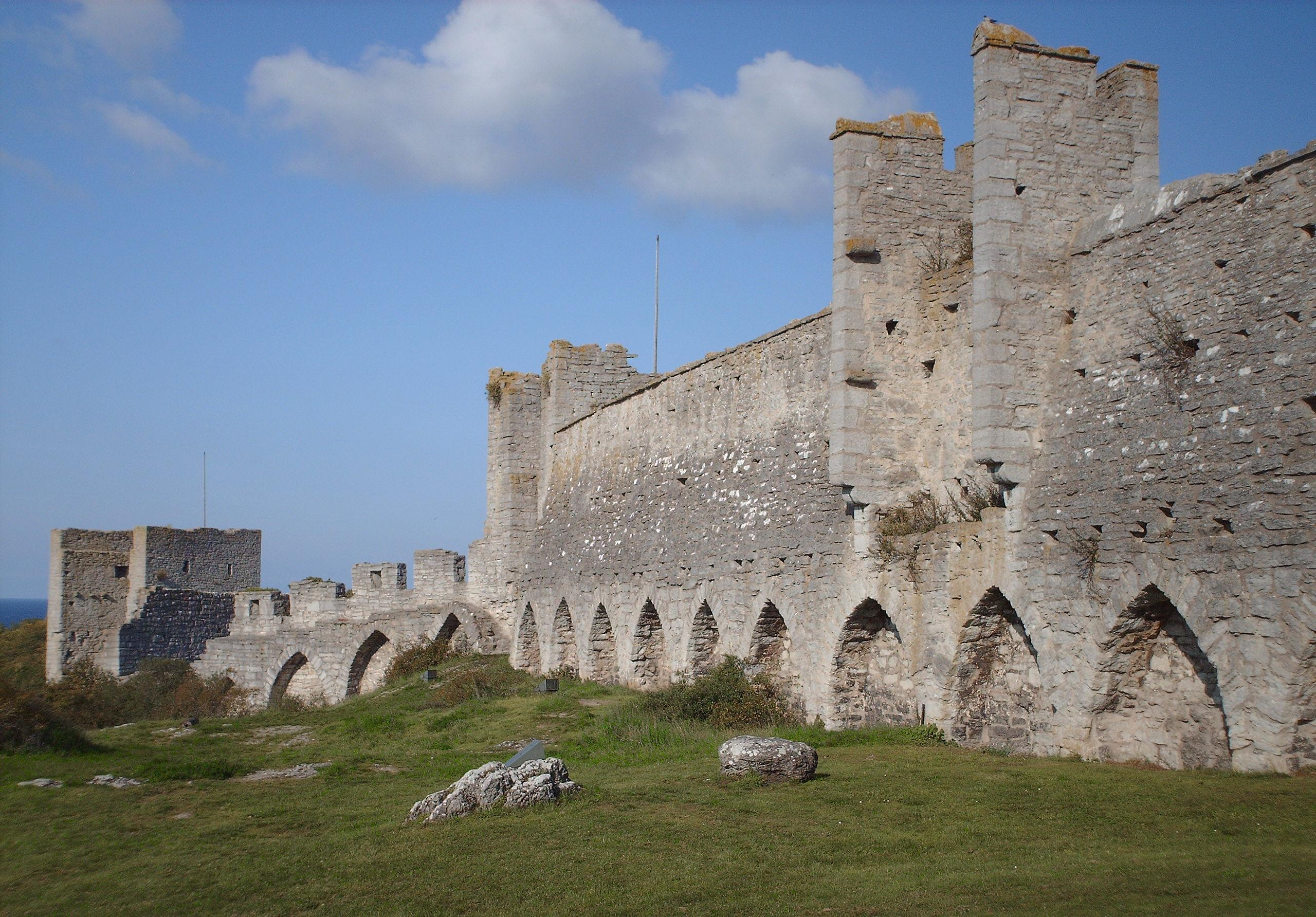
Inside of the wall

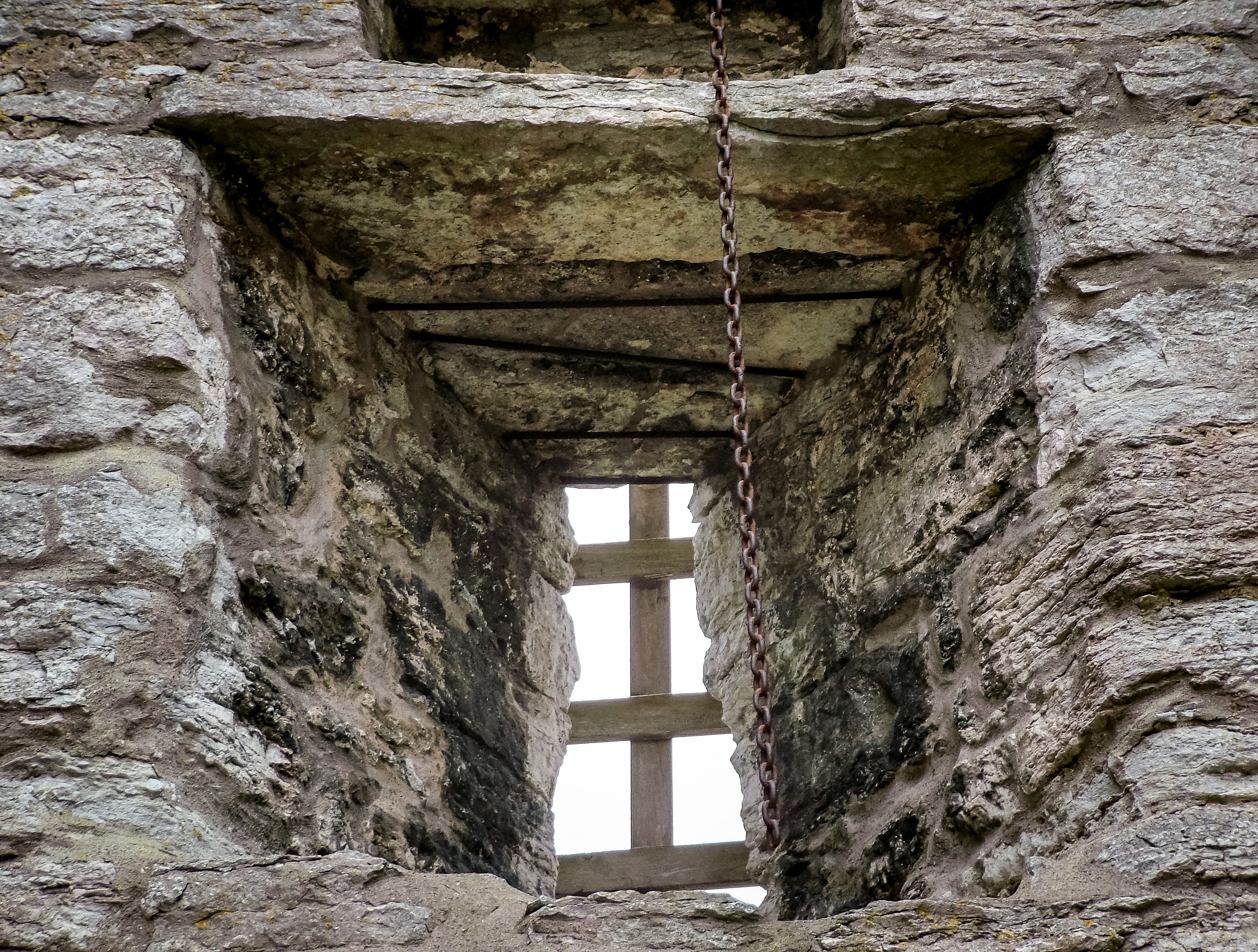
Embrasure in the wall

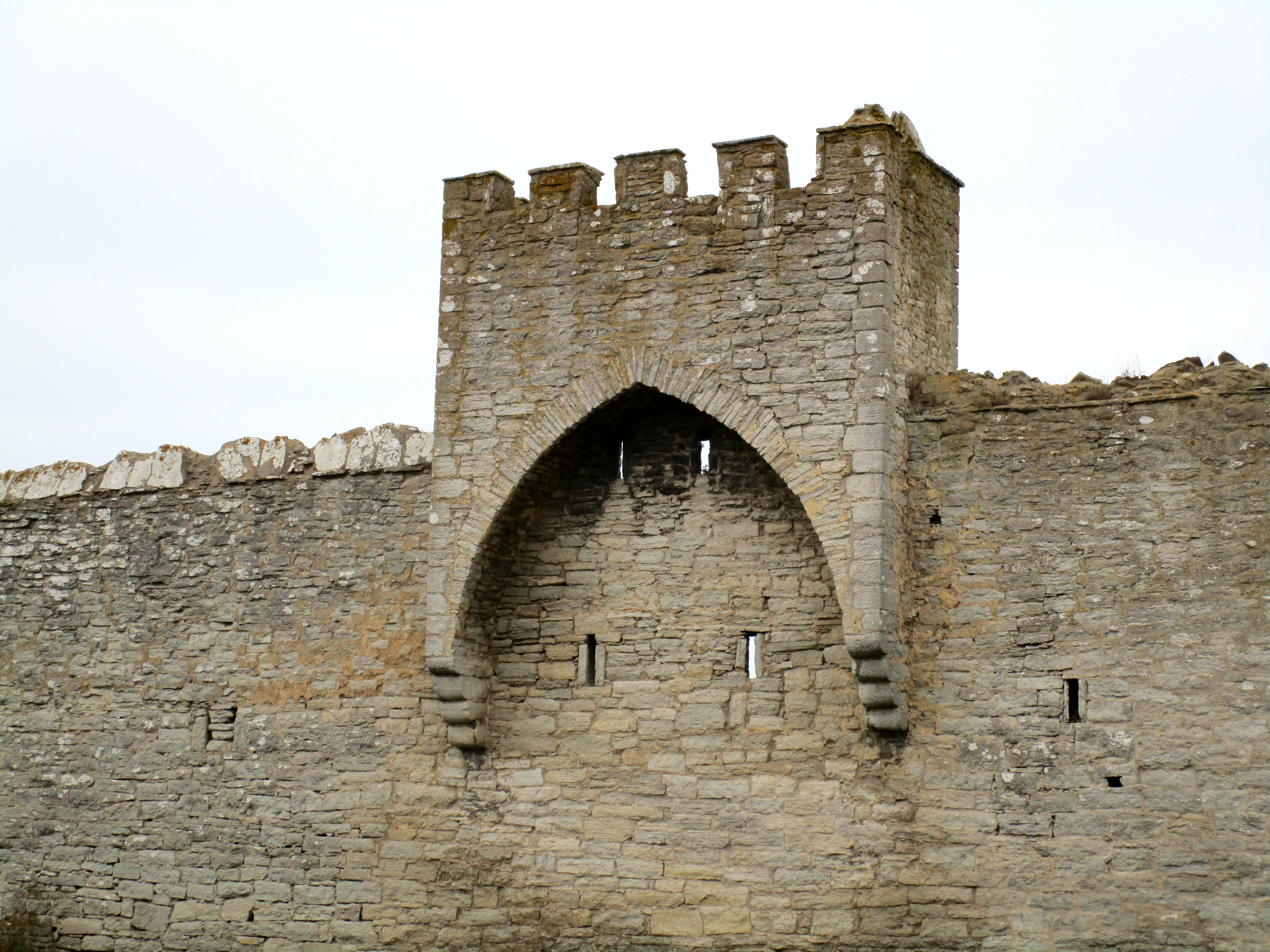
A small tower riding on the wall west of the South Gate

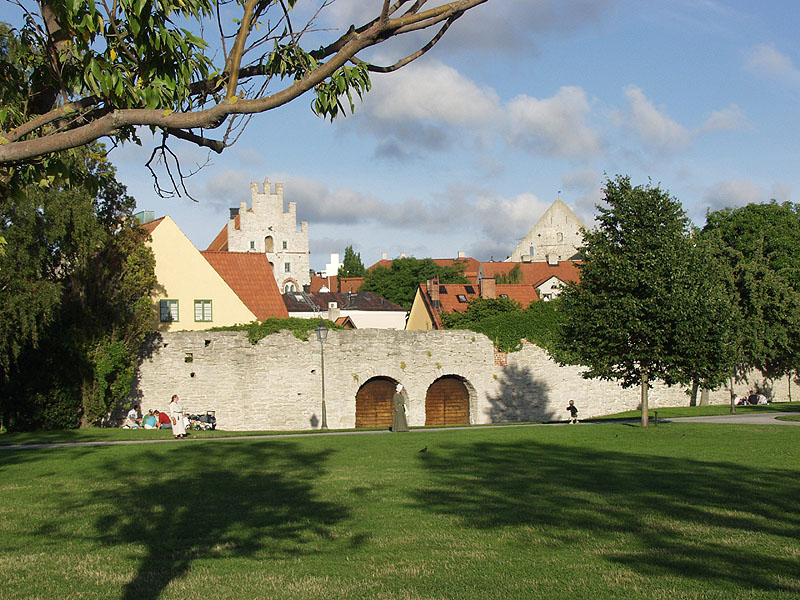
The wall from Almedalen park

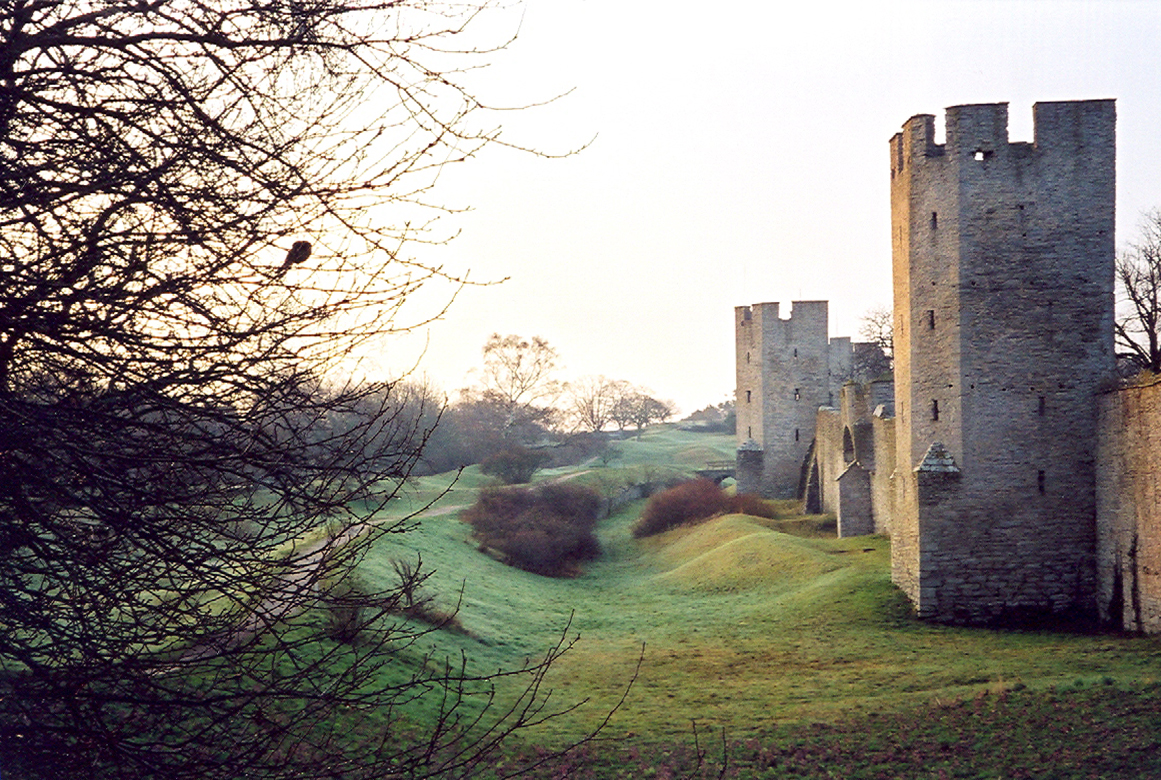
The North Trench

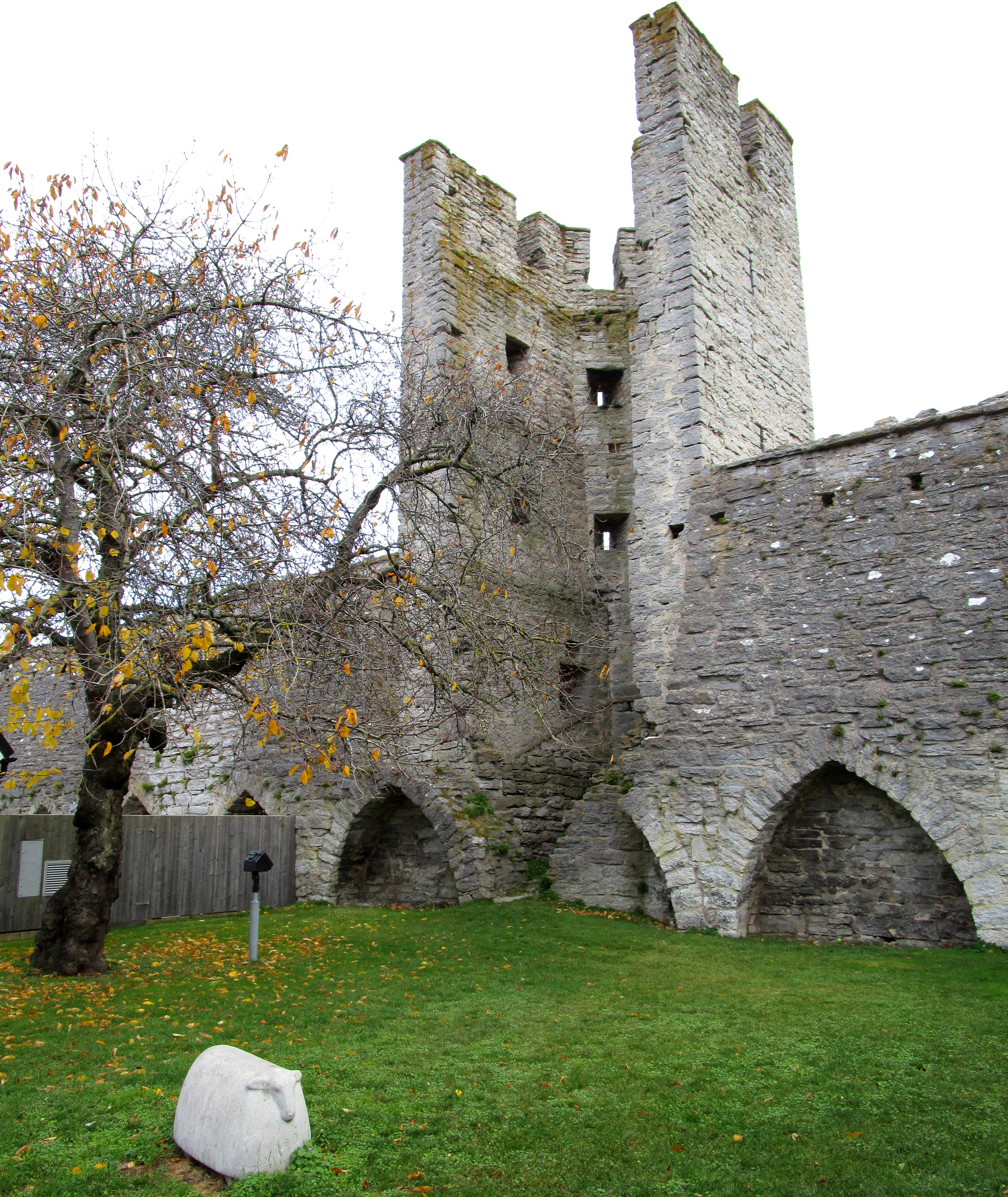
Arrowslits inside a tower north of the Well Gate

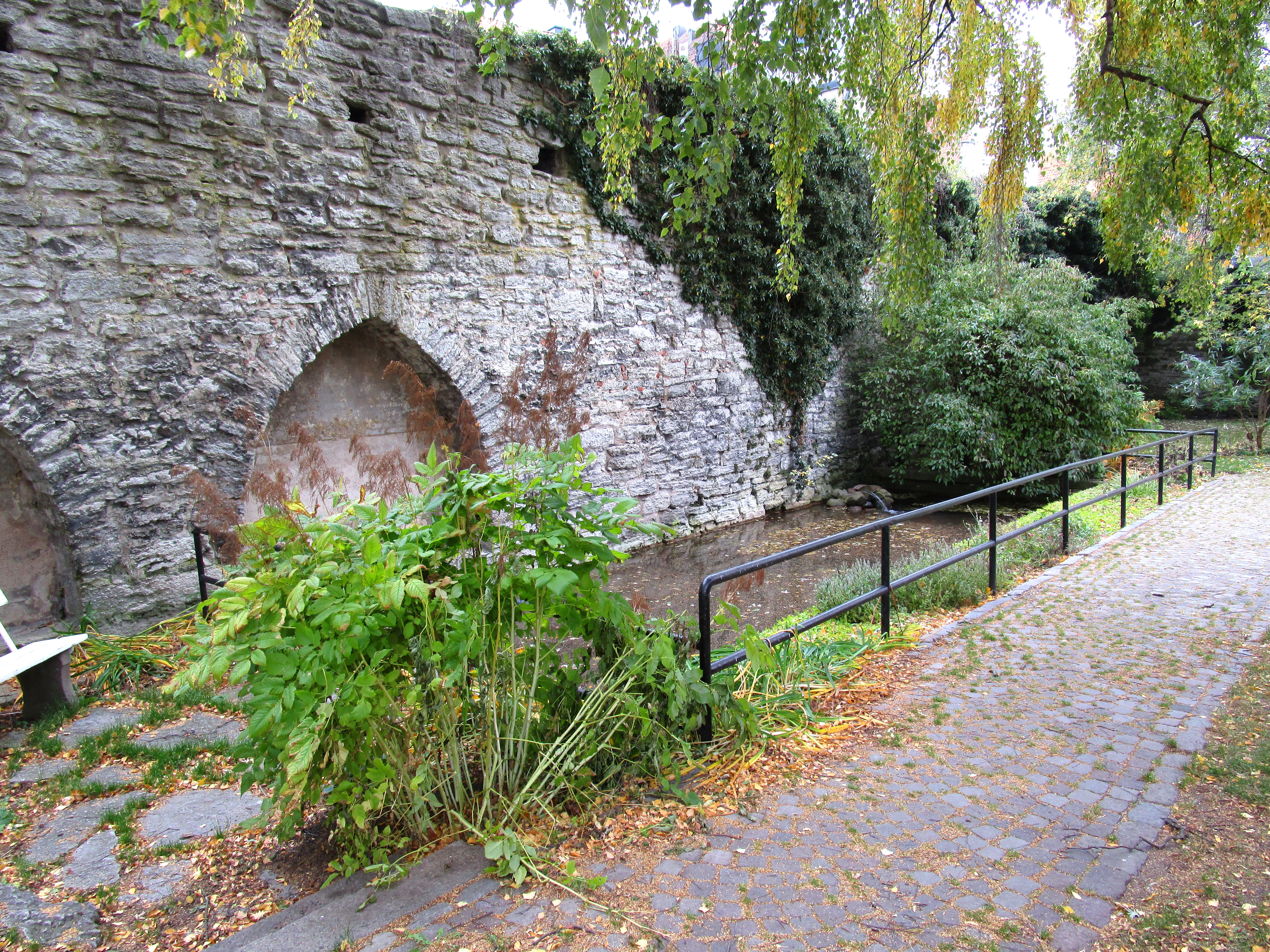
Pond outside the Wall between the Large and Small Beach Gate

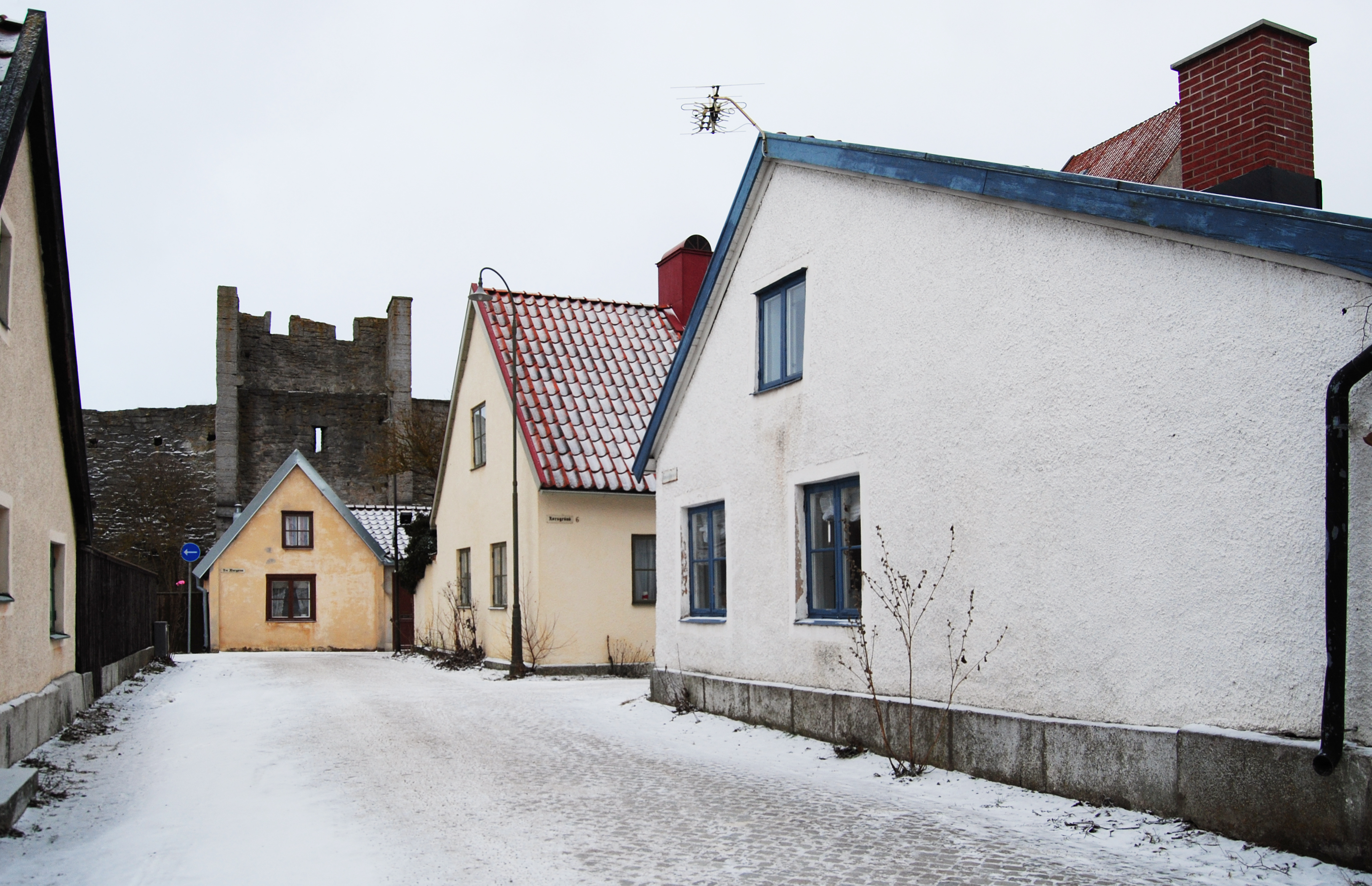
The city wall as seen from a street on the inside

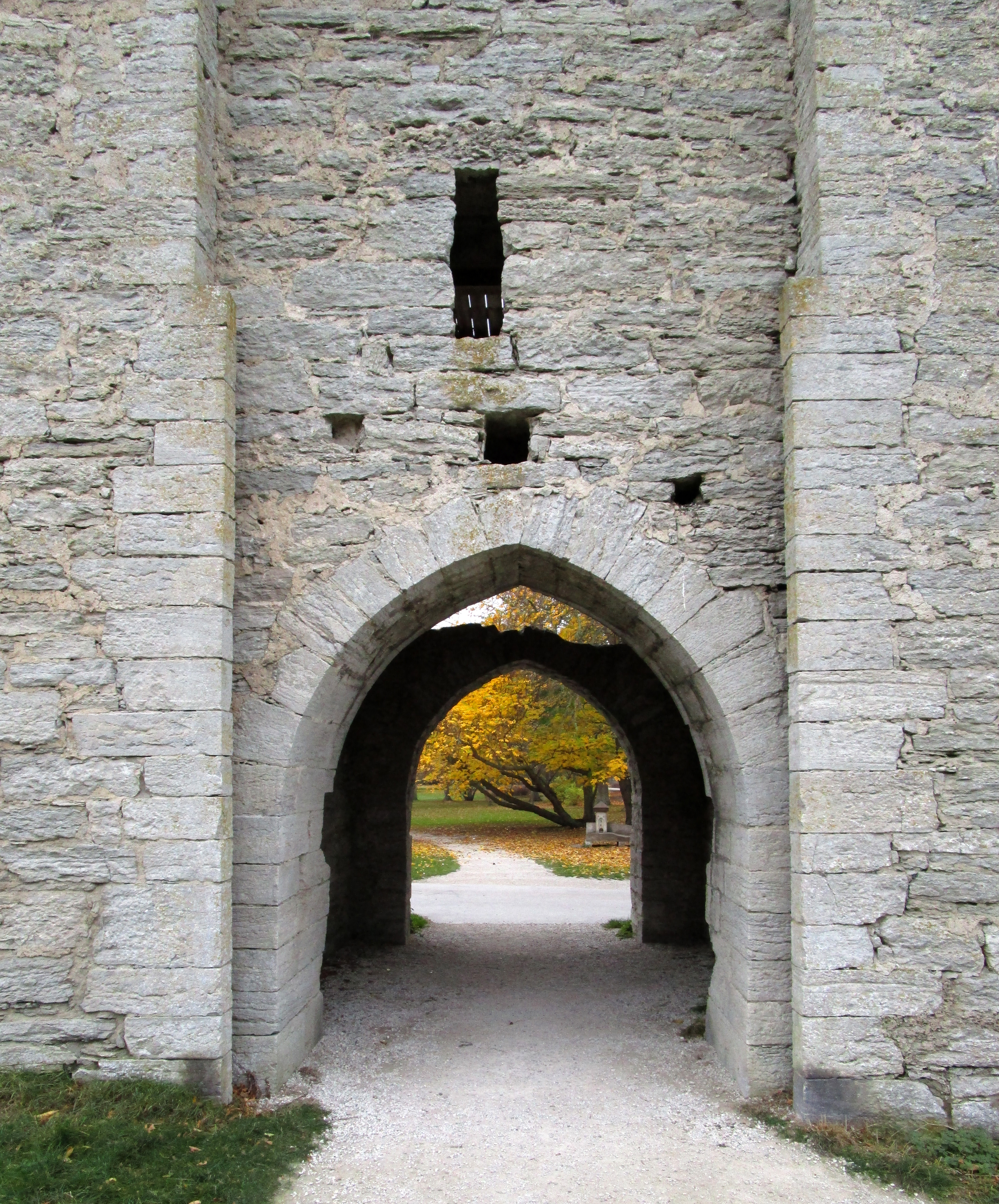
A closer view of one of the gates (Snäckgärdsporten)
