= Boden-Karlsborg Artillery Regiment =

- Boden-Karlsborgs artilleriregemente
- Active: 1893–1919
- Country: Sweden
- Allegiance: Swedish Armed Forces
- Branch: Swedish Army
- Type: Artillery
- Size: Regiment
- Garrison/HQ: Boden, Karlsborg
- Patron: Saint Barbara
- Colors: Yellow and black
- March: "Re e Patria" (Canzano) (Note: The march was adopted in 1916, and was inherited by Boden Artillery Regiment in 1919, and established in 1953 by Army Order 33/1953.)
- Anniversaries: 4 December (Note: 4 December is saint day of Saint Barbara.)

Boden-Karlsborg Artillery Regiment (Swedish: Boden-Karlsborgs artilleriregemente), designation A 8, was a Swedish Army artillery unit which operated between 1893 and 1919. The unit was based in Boden Garrison in Boden, Sweden.

== History ==
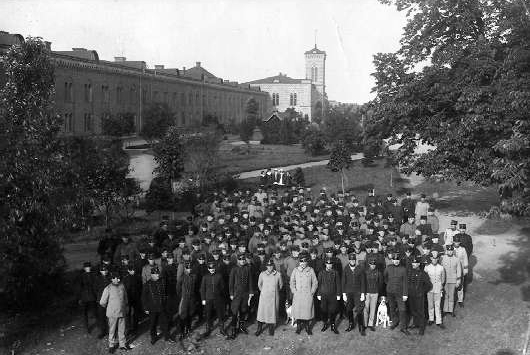
Men from the Boden-Karlsborg Artillery Regiment at Karlsborg Fortress in 1919.

The corps was raised on 10 October 1893 by the 1st and 2nd Fortress Company being separated from the 1st Göta Artillery Regiment and formed an independent unit. In 1882, the Karlsborg Fortress was added to the 1st Fortress Company from the Varberg Fortress, after Varberg Fortress expired in 1830 from the Swedish war organization. The 1st Fortress Company was formed in 1811 from the rubble from the Finnish Artillery Regiment, which had been incorporated into the First Göta Artillery Regiment in connection with the loss of Finland in 1809. In 1882, the Karlsborg Fortress was added to the 2nd Fortress Company from the Karlsten Fortress, after Karlsten Fortress expired in 1882 from the Swedish war organization.

Through the 1901 Defense Reform, it was decided that Karlsborg Artillery Corps from 1 January 1902 would be organized as Boden-Karlsborg Artillery Regiment. The regiment was organized in two battalions, the 1st Battalion in Karlsborg and 2nd Battalion in Boden. In 1914, all order numbers within the Swedish Army were adjusted. For Boden-Karlsborg Artillery Regiment, this meant that the regiment was assigned the designation A 8. The adjustment of the designation made it possible to distinguish the regiments between the service branches and from their possible reserve and duplication regiments.

During the late autumn of 1919, the regiment was divided into two independent units; Bodens Artillery Regiment (A 8) and Karlsborg Artillery Corps (A 10). From 10 September 1919, only the battalion in Karlsborg remained, and on 31 December 1919 the regiment was disbanded. On 1 January 1920, the battalion in Karlsborg formed Karlsborg Artillery Corps.

== Location and training areas ==
When the regiment was raised as Karlsborg Artillery Corps, it was placed to Karlsborg Fortress. When the corps was reorganized into a regiment, the 1st Battalion was placed to Karlsborg and the 2nd Battalion to Boden. During the years 1902–1912, the regimental staff was located in Karlsborg Garrison, and in the years 1912–1919 in Boden Garrison.

=== Detachment ===
==== Boden ====
In Boden, the regiment's 2nd Battalion was placed, which also went under the name of Boden Artillery Battalion (A 8 B). The battalion was formed on 1 September 1906, and was placed in a newly built barracks area along the Åbergsleden. Karlsborg was until 1912 the regiment's main garrison, but from 1 November 1912 the regimental staff was relocated to Boden. Boden Artillery Battalion was separated from the regiment, forming an independent unit on 10 September 1919, the Boden Artillery Regiment (A 8).

==== Karlsborg ====
In Karlsborg, the regiment's 2nd Battalion was placed, which also went under the name of Karlsborg Artillery Battalion (A 8 K). Until 30 October 1912, Karlsborg was the main town for the regiment, but from 1 November 1912 when the regimental staff was placed in Boden, Karlsborg became a detachment. Karlsborg Artillery Battalion was disbanded on 31 December 1919, and on 1 January 1920, formed Karlsborg Artillery Corps (A 10). A 10 was later reorganized into Karlsborg Anti-Aircraft Regiment (Lv 1).

== Heraldry and traditions ==
The regiment never had a colour or standard, but was only identified by the service branch insignia and its colors (yellow and black). When the regiment was disbanded, its colors, designation and the march were taken over by the newly formed Boden Artillery Regiment.

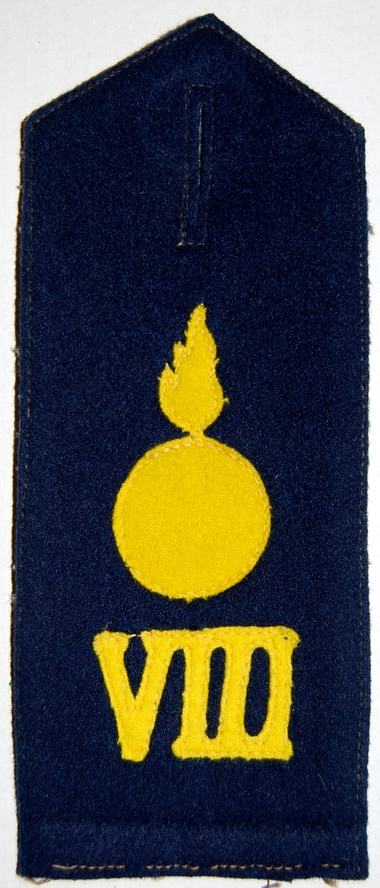
Shoulder strap m/1910 for private of the Boden-Karlsborg Artillery Regiment.

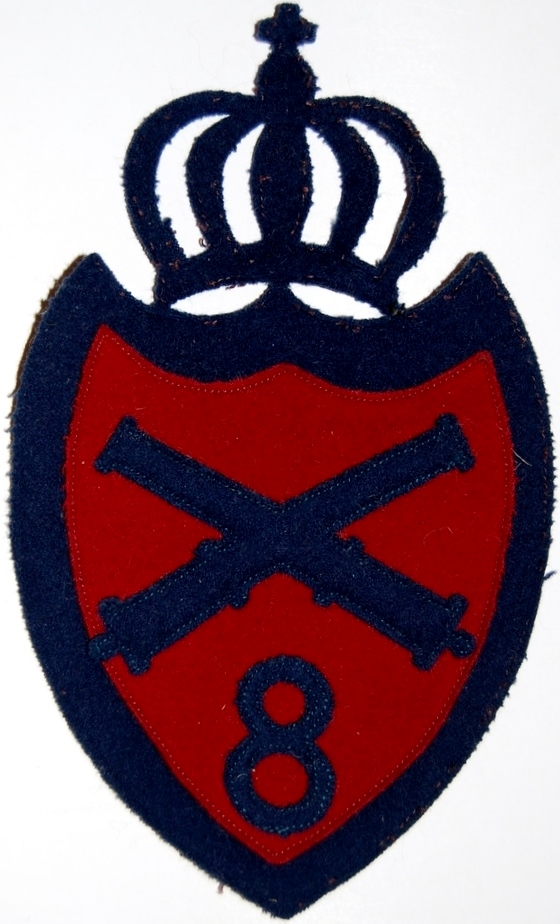
Military patch m/1906 for soldiers and sergeants of the Boden-Karlsborg Artillery Regiment.

== Commanding officers ==
- 1893–1895: Conrad Gustaf Waldemar Wetterwik
- 1895–1906: Carl Hägg
- 1906-1913: Karl G. E. Kniberg
- 1913-1918: Axel Breitholtz
- 1918-1919: Sixten Schmidt

== Names, designations and locations ==
Name	Translation	From		To
Kungl. Karlsborgs artillerikår	Royal Karlsborg Artillery Corps	1893-10-01	–	1901-12-31
Kungl. Boden-Karlsborgs artilleriregemente	Royal Boden-Karlsborg Artillery Regiment	1902-01-01	–	1919-12-31
Designation		From		To
No 9		1893-10-01	–	1901-12-31
No 8		1902-01-01	–	1914-09-30
A 8		1914-10-01	–	1919-12-31
Location		From		To
Karlsborg Garrison		1893-10-01	–	1919-12-31
Boden Garrison		1906-09-01	–	1919-09-09

== See also ==
- List of Swedish artillery regiments
