= List of Swedish artillery regiments =

This is a list of Swedish artillery regiments, battalions, corps and companies that have existed in the Swedish Army. They are listed in three ways, first by the actual units that have existed, then by the various names these units have had, and last by the various designations these units have had.

== By unit ==
=== New system ===
- A 1 Svea Artillery Regiment (1914–1998)
- A 2 Göta Artillery Regiment (1914–1962)
- A 3 Wendes Artillery Regiment (1914–2000)
- A 4 Norrland Artillery Regiment (1914–1998)
- A 5 Uppland Artillery Regiment (1914–1927)
- A 5 Norrbotten Artillery Corps (1928–1951)
- A 6 Småland Artillery Regiment (1914–1927, 1942–1985)
- A 6 Småland Army Artillery Regiment (1928–1942)
- A 7 Gotland Artillery Corps (1914–1975)
- A 7 Gotland Artillery Regiment (1975–2000)
- A 8 Boden-Karlsborg Artillery Regiment (1914–1920)
- A 8 Boden Artillery Regiment (1920–1998, 2022-)
- A 8 Norrland Artillery Regiment (1998–2000)
- A 9 Positionsartilleriregementet (1914–1927)
- A 9 Karlsborg Artillery Regiment (1928–1937)
- A 9 Karlsborg Anti-Aircraft Artillery Regiment (1937–1942)
- A 9 Bergslagen Artillery Regiment (1943–2000, 2022-)
- A 9 Artillery Regiment (2000-2022)
- A 10 Karlsborg Artillery Corps (1920–1927)
- A 10 Östgöta Anti-Aircraft Artillery Regiment (1938–1942)
- A 11 Stockholm Anti-Aircraft Artillery Regiment (1939–1942)

=== Old system(–1914) ===
- Artillery Regiment (1636–1794)
- No 1 Svea Artillery Regiment (1794–1892, 1904–1914)
- No 1 1st Svea Artillery Regiment (1892–1904)
- No 2 Göta Artillery Regiment (1794–1892, 1904–1914)
- No 2 1st Göta Artillery Regiment (1892–1904)
- No 3 Wendes Artillery Regiment (1794–1914)
- No 4 Finnish Artillery Regiment (1794–1811)
- Gotlands nationalbevärings artilleribeväring (1811–1861)
- No 4 Gotlands nationalbevärings artillerikår (1861–1887)
- No 4 Gotland Artillery Corps (1887–1892)
- No 4 Norrland Artillery Regiment (1893–1914)
- No 5 Vaxholm Artillery Corps (1794–1892)
- No 5 2nd Svea Artillery Regiment (1894–1904)
- No 5 Uppland Artillery Regiment (1904–1914)
- No 6 2nd Göta Artillery Regiment (1894–1905)
- No 6 Småland Artillery Regiment (1905–1914)
- No 7 Gotland Artillery Corps (1892–1914)
- No 8 Vaxholm Artillery Corps (1892–1901)
- No 8 Boden-Karlsborg Artillery Regiment (1902–1914)
- No 9 Karlsborg Artillery Corps (1893–1902)
- No 9 Positionsartilleriregementet (1902–1914)

== By name ==
- 2nd Göta Artillery Regiment
- 2nd Svea Artillery Regiment
- Artillery Regiment, old
- Artillery Regiment, new
- Bergslagen Artillery Regiment
- Boden-Karlsborg Artillery Regiment
- Boden Artillery Battalion
- Boden Artillery Regiment
- Former Finnish Artillery Regiment
- Finnish Artillery Regiment
- Field Artillery Regiment
- 1st Göta Artillery Regiment
- 1st Svea Artillery Regiment
- Gotland Artillery Corps
- Gotland Artillery Regiment
- Göta Artillery Regiment
- Karlsborg Artillery Battalion
- Karlsborg Artillery Corps
- Norrbotten Artillery Corps
- Norrland Artillery Battalion
- Norrland Artillery Regiment
- Positionsartilleriregementet
- Småland Army Artillery Regiment
- Småland Artillery Regiment
- Svea Artillery Regiment
- Uppland Artillery Regiment
- Vaxholm Artillery Corps
- Wendes Artillery Regiment

== By designation ==
- A 1
- A 2
- A 3
- A 4
- A 5
- A 6
- A 7
- A 8
- A 8 B
- A 8 K
- A 9
- A 10
- A 11
- Artbat/I 19
- Artreg

== See also ==
- List of Swedish regiments
