= Bengt Bengtsson =

Swedish Army officer and gymnast (1897–1977)

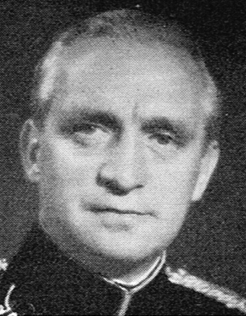
- Bengtsson in military uniform
- Born: Bengt Folke Bengtsson; 30 September 1897; Tåssjö, Sweden
- Died: 10 October 1977 (aged 80); Stockholm, Sweden
- Relatives: Frans G. Bengtsson (brother)
- Military career
- Allegiance: Sweden
- Branch: Swedish Army
- Service years: 1918–1957
- Rank: Colonel
- Unit: Swedish Volunteer Corps
- Commands: Gothenburg Anti-Aircraft Corps; Karlsborg Anti-Aircraft Regiment; Inspector of the Air Defence
- Conflicts: Winter War

Gymnastics career
- Discipline: Men's artistic gymnastics
- Country represented: Sweden
- Gym: KFUM:s IF
Medal record
Men's artistic gymnastics
Representing Sweden
Olympic Games
Gold medal – first place	1920 Antwerp	Team, Swedish system

Colonel Bengt Folke Bengtsson (30 September 1897 – 10 October 1977) was a Swedish Army officer and gymnast. As a gymnast, he won an Olympic gold medal at the 1920 Summer Olympics. As a military member, he served in the Air Defense Artillery Branch and finished his career as Inspector of the Air Defence from 1953 to 1957.

== Early life ==
Bengtsson was born on 30 September 1897 at Rössjöholm Castle in Tåssjö, Kristianstad County, the son of Sven Bengtsson, an estate agent, and his wife Ella (née Ljunggren). Bengt Bengtsson was the youngest brother of Swedish author Frans G. Bengtsson. Bengtsson passed studentexamen in Kristianstad in 1916.

== Career ==
Bengtsson was commissioned as an officer in 1918 and was assigned as a second lieutenant to Wendes Artillery Regiment in Kristianstad. He attended the Royal Central Gymnastics Institute from 1921 to 1922. He competed as a gymnast in the 1920 Summer Olympics. He was part of the Swedish team, which was able to win the gold medal in the gymnastics men's team, Swedish system event in 1920.

Bengtsson attended the Swedish Army Artillery and Engineering College's higher course from 1922 to 1924. He did rehearsal training from 1924 to 1926 and became a lieutenant in the Artillery Staff in 1930. In 1931, he underwent aerial reconnaissance training and was promoted to captain in 1932. The same year Bengtsson was posted to Finland. He then served in Småland Artillery Regiment in Jönköping in 1936 where he became a major in 1939. Bengtsson transferred to the Air Defence Artillery Branch (Luftvärnstrupperna) in 1939 and served in the General Staff Corps in 1940. He participated in the Winter War in 1940.

Bengtsson was promoted to lieutenant colonel in 1941 and was head of the Defence Staff's Air Defence Department from 1940 to 1943. He served as an expert in the Air Protection Inspectorate (Luftskyddsinspektionen) and the Evacuation Commission (Utrymningskommissionen) from 1940 to 1943, as an agent in the National Air Protection Federation (Riksluftskyddsförbundet) from 1940 to 1943 and was a member of the Homeland Defence Experts of 1941 (1941 års hemortsförsvarssakkunniga). Bengtsson was promoted to colonel in 1944 and was appointed commander of Gothenburg Anti-Aircraft Corps in 1943. He became commander of Karlsborg Anti-Aircraft Regiment in Karlsborg in 1946 and was the local commander in Karlsborg from 1946 to 1953. Bengtsson then served as Inspector of the Inspector of the Air Defence from 1953 from 1957, during which time he was a member of the Air Defence Investigation (Luftförsvarsutredningen) from 1953 to 1954. He was employed at the Swedish National Defence Research Institute in 1958.

He was chairman of the Lv l:s kamratförening from 1953 and a board member of the AB CEA-verken from 1943.

== Personal life ==
In 1932, Bengtsson married Karin (Kai) Fresk (born 1904) the daughter of senior engineer Albert Fresk and Gurli (née Söderström). They had one child: Göran (born 1933).

== Dates of rank ==
- 1918 – Second Lieutenant
- 1930 – Lieutenant
- 1932 – Captain
- 1939 – Major
- 1941 – Lieutenant colonel
- 1944 – Colonel

== Awards and decorations ==
- (Sweden) Commander 1st Class of the Order of the Sword
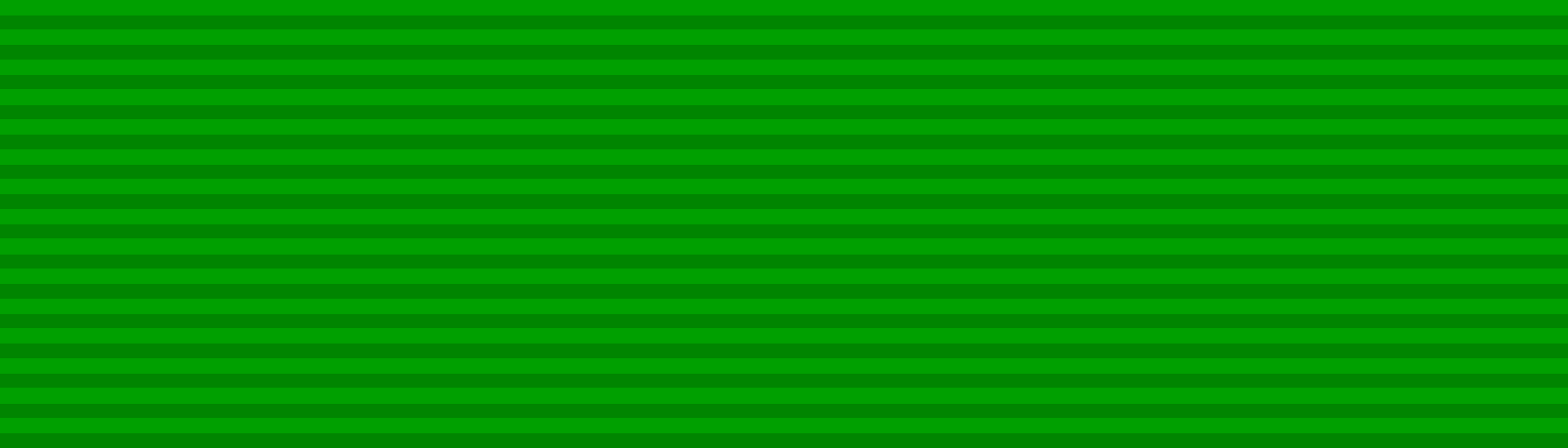
- (Sweden) Knight of the Order of Vasa
- (Sweden) Swedish Civil Protection Association Merit Badge in gold
- (Sweden) Swedish Women's Voluntary Defence Organization Royal Medal of Merit in silver
- (Sweden) Ski gold medal (SkidlmG)
- (Sweden) Pistol shooting gold medal (PistolskytteGM)
- (Sweden) Skaraborg befäls(utbildnings)-förbunds guldmedalj
- (Sweden) Örebro befäls(utbildnings)-förbunds silvermedalj

=== Foreign ===
- (Norway) Commander with Star of the Order of St. Olav
- (Nazi Germany) 1st Class of the Order of the German Eagle
- (Finland) Order of the Cross of Liberty, 3rd Class with sword
- 1st Class of the Finland's Population Protection Medal of Merit (Finlands Befolkningsskydds förtjänstmedalj, FBskftjM1kl)
- (Finland) Finnish War Commemorative Medal
- Olympic Gold Medal (1920)

== Honours ==
- Member of the Royal Swedish Academy of War Sciences (1944)

== Bibliography ==
- Bengtsson, Bengt Folke (1943). Bombanfall och bombverkan (in Swedish). Stockholm: Riksluftskyddsförbundet. SELIBR 1388604.
- Bengtsson, Bengt Folke (1941). Vad var och en måste veta om bombanfall (in Swedish). Stockholm: Riksluftskyddsförbundet. SELIBR 2547385.
