= Karlsborg Artillery Corps =

Karlsborg Artillery Corps (Swedish: Karlsborg artillerikår) may refer to:

- Karlsborg Artillery Corps (No 9), a Swedish Army artillery corps from 1893 to 1901. It was reorganized into the Boden-Karlsborg Artillery Regiment in 1902.
- Karlsborg Artillery Corps (A 10), a Swedish Army artillery corps from 1920 to 1927. It was reorganized into the Karlsborg Artillery Regiment in 1927
