= Artilleriregementet =

Artilleriregementet is a Swedish regimental name that has been used by the following units:

- Artilleriregementet (old), artillery regiment (1636–1794)
- Artilleriregementet (new), artillery regiment (2000–)
