= Artillery Regiment =

Artillery Regiment may refer to the following military units:

- Artillery Regiment (2000), current Swedish Army unit
- Artillery Regiment (1636), Swedish Army unit active 1636–1794
- Danish Artillery Regiment, also sometimes called simply Artillery Regiment
- Regiment of Artillery, Indian military corps
- Royal Regiment of Artillery, British military corps
- Regiment of Artillery (Bangladesh)
