= Göta Artillery Regiment =

- Göta artilleriregemente
- Active: 1794–1962
- Country: Sweden
- Allegiance: Swedish Armed Forces
- Branch: Swedish Army
- Type: Artillery
- Size: Regiment
- Part of: 3rd Military Area (1833–1893); 3rd Army Division (1893–1901); III Army Division (1902–1927); Western Army Division (1928–1936); III Army Division (1937–1942); III Military District (1942–1962)
- Garrison/HQ: Gothenburg
- Patron: Saint Barbara
- Colors: Yellow
- March: "Auf nach Valencia" (Eisengräber) (Note: The march was established in 1953 by Army Order 33/1953. It was later used by the Östgota Army Air Battalion (Östgöta arméflygbataljon) from 1987 to 2004, and by the Gothenburg Group (Göteborgsgruppen) from 2000 to 2004.)
- Anniversaries: 4 December (Note: 4 December is saint day of Saint Barbara.)

Insignia
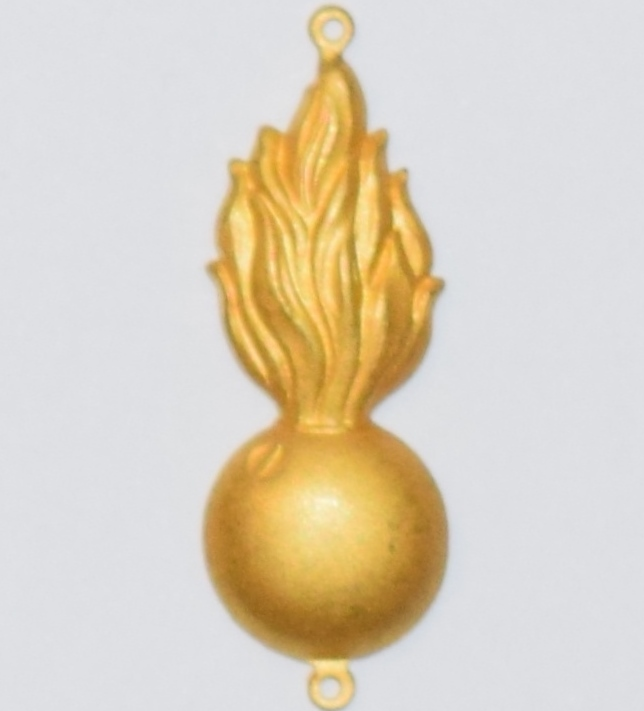
- Branch insignia

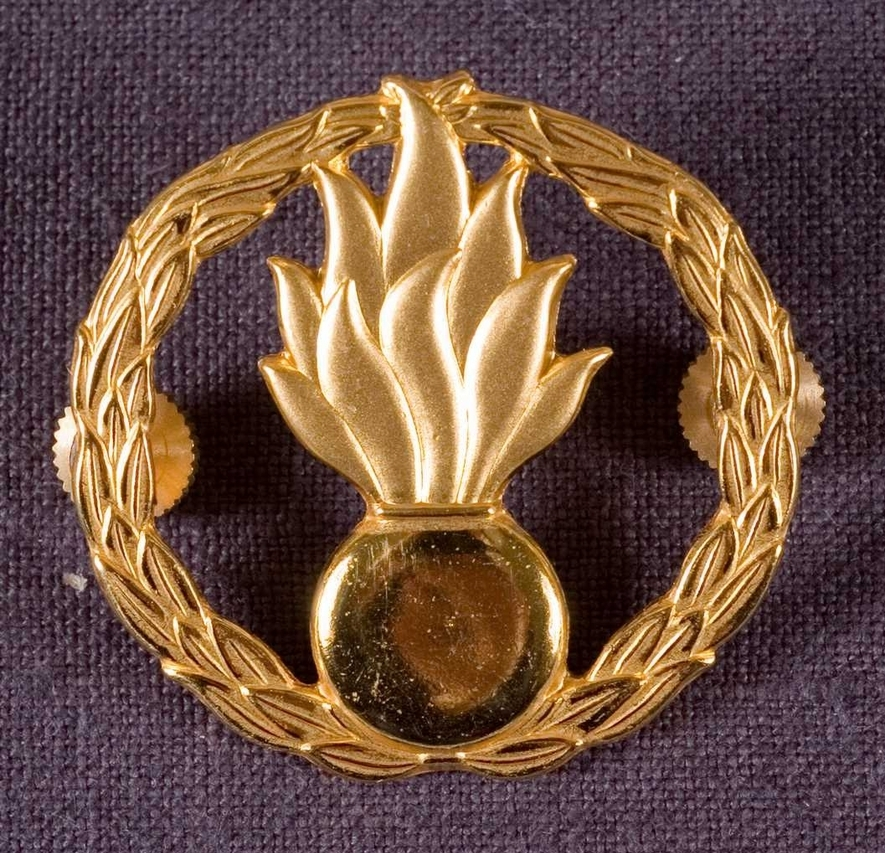
- Cap badge

The Göta Artillery Regiment (Swedish: Göta artilleriregemente), designation A 2, was a Swedish Army artillery regiment that traced its origins back to the 17th century. It was disbanded in 1962. The regiment's soldiers were originally recruited from Götaland, and it was also garrisoned there.

== History ==
The regiment has its origins in the Artillery Regiment, raised in 1636. That regiment was split into four new regiments in 1794 of which Göta Artillery Regiment was one. The regiment was given the designation A 2 (2nd Artillery Regiment) in 1830. In 1893 four companies were split off to form Norrland Artillery Regiment and Karlsborg Artillery Corps.

The regiment also changed name to 1st Göta Artillery Regiment (Första Göta artilleriregemente) in 1893, and another two companies were split off to form Småland Artillery Regiment in 1895. The name was changed back again in 1904. The regiment was garrisoned in Gothenburg until it was disbanded in 1962.

== Campaigns ==
- ?

== Organisation ==
- ?

== Heraldry and traditions ==
The regiment was awarded a unit standard by His Majesty the Gustaf V on his birthday on 16 June 1938. During the disbandment of the regiment, Gothenburg Anti-Aircraft Corps took over traditions and the standard. Also part of the name was taken over by the anti-aircraft corps, when it on 1 July 1962 changed its name to Göta Anti-Aircraft Regiment (Göta luftvärnsregemente). The memory of the regiment is carried on by the Artillery Regiment.

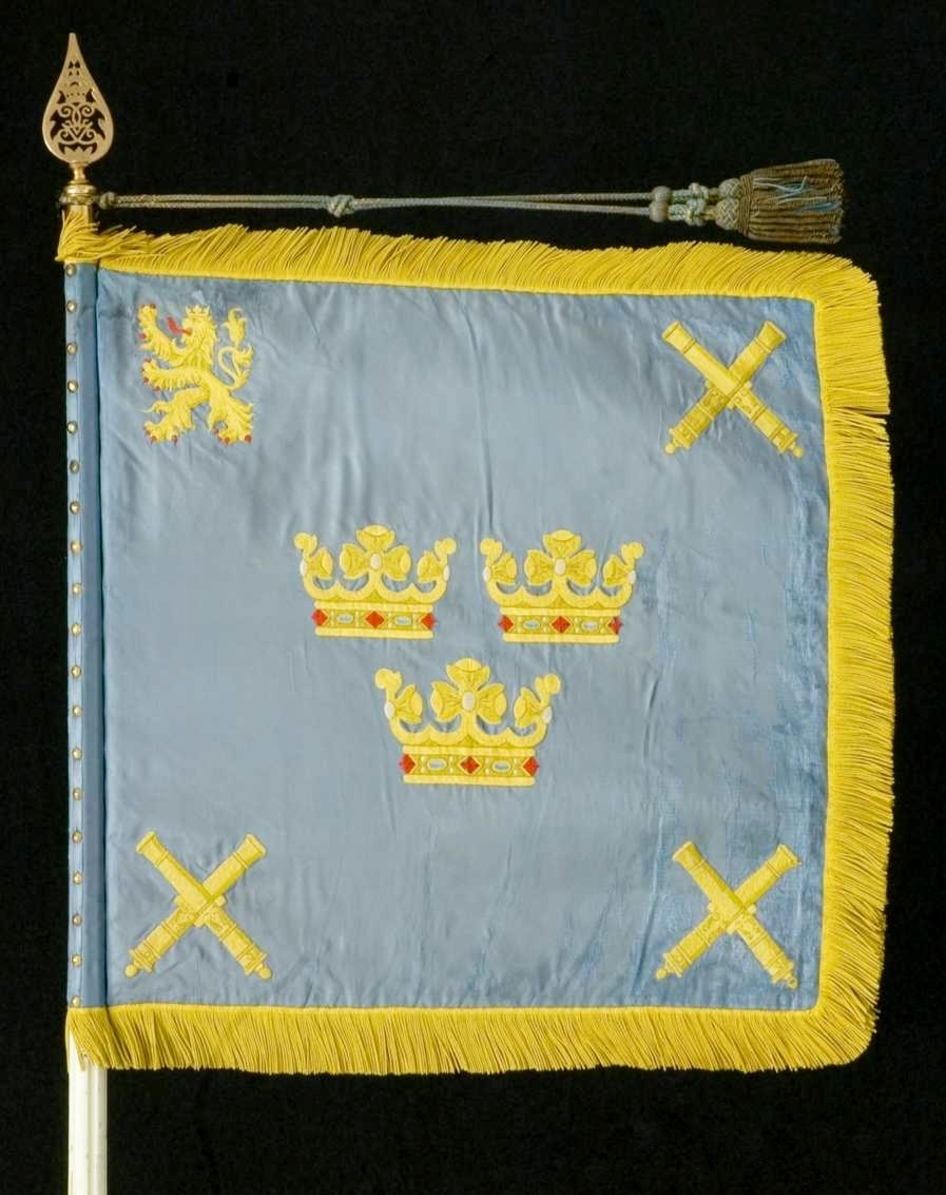
The regimental standard

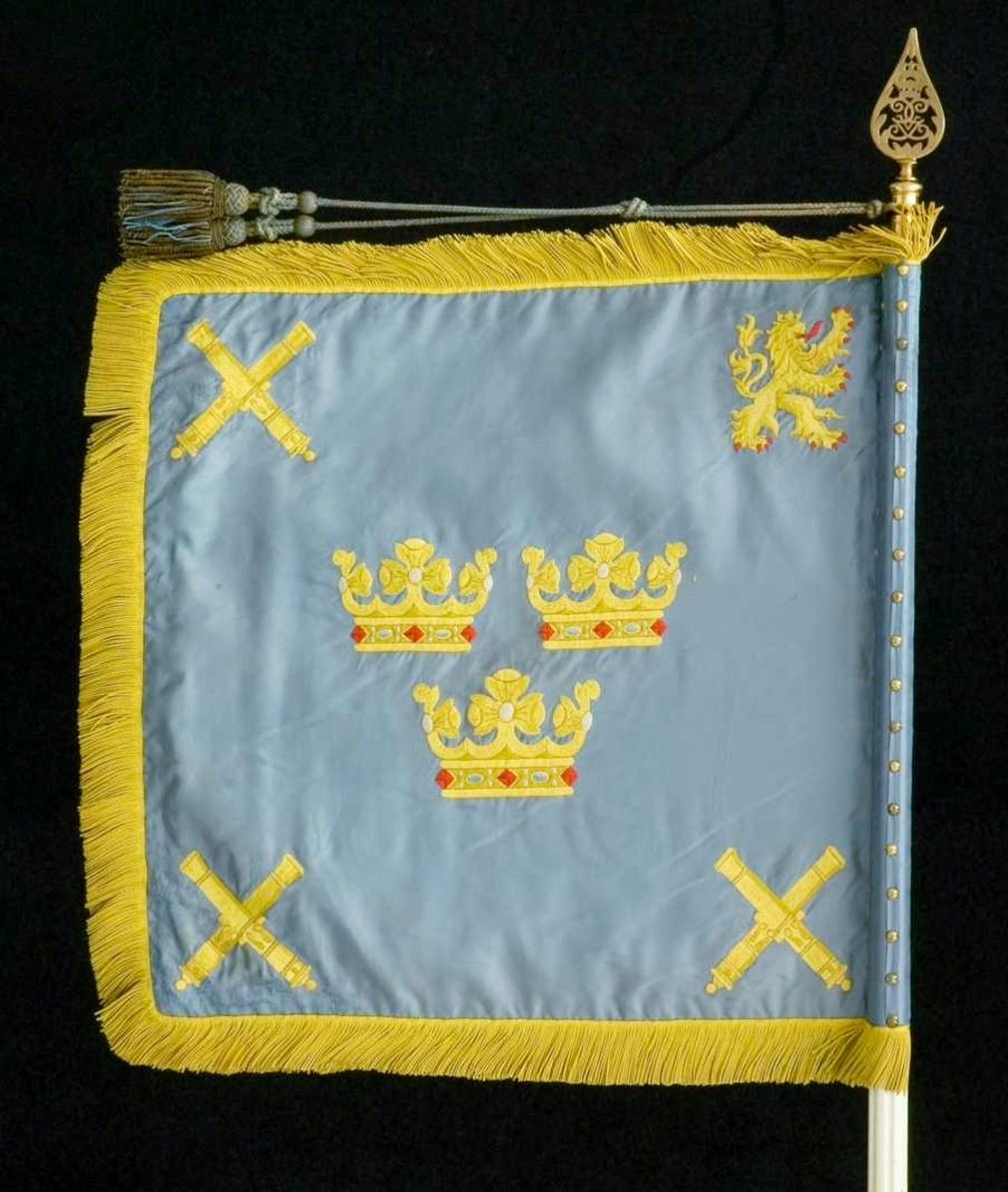
The regimental standard

== Commanding officers ==
Regimental commanders between 1794 and 1962.

- 1794–1801: Anders Leonard Treffenberg
- 1801–1817: Carl Ulric Silfversköld
- 1817–1834: Gillis Edenhjelm
- 1834–1840: Gustaf Adolf Flemming
- 1840–1849: Peter Carl Heijl
- 1849–1858: Bror Gustaf Reinhold Munck af Fulkila
- 1858–1860: Knut August Schytzerkrans
- 1860–1870: Charles Nicolas Berg
- 1870–1884: Frans Reinhold Carlsohn
- 1884–1888: Karl Vilhelm Kuylenstjerna
- 1888–1898: John Raoul Hamilton
- 1898–1904: Georg Liljenroth
- 1904–1913: Axel Bergenzaun
- 1913–1922: Carl Bastiat Hamilton
- 1922–1930: Sixten Schmidt
- 1930-1931: Oscar Osterman
- 1931–1936: Gunnar Salander
- 1936–1938: Axel Rappe
- 1938–1943: Sune Bergelin
- 1943–1946: Gunnar Ekeroth
- 1946–1957: Stig Tarras-Wahlberg
- 1957–1960: Alarik Astrup G:son Bergman
- 1960–1962: Nils Gustaf Holmstedt

== Names, designations and locations ==
Name	Translation	From		To
Kungl. Göta artilleriregemente	Royal Göta Artillery Regiment	1794-06-23	–	1892-12-31
Kungl. Första Göta artilleriregemente	Royal First Göta Artillery Regiment	1893-01-01	–	1904-12-07
Kungl Göta artilleriregemente	Royal Göta Artillery Regiment	1904-12-08	–	1962-03-31
Avvecklingsorganisation	Decommissioning Organization	1962-04-01	–	1962-09-30
Designation		From		To
№ 2		1816-10-01	–	1914-09-30
A 2		1914-10-01	–	1962-03-31
Location		From		To
Gothenburg/Otterhällan		1806-03-31	–	1895-09-30
Gothenburg/Kviberg		1895-10-01	–	1962-03-31

== See also ==
- List of Swedish artillery regiments
