= Karlsborg Artillery Regiment =

Coordinates: 58°31′52.6″N 14°31′47.2″E

- Karlsborgs artilleriregemente
- Active: 1920–1937
- Country: Sweden
- Allegiance: Swedish Armed Forces
- Branch: Swedish Army
- Type: Artillery
- Size: Regiment
- Part of: III Army Division (1920–1927); Western Army Division (1928–1936); III Army Division (1937–1937)
- Garrison/HQ: Karlsborg
- Colors: Dark blue
- March: "Till fronten" (Rydberg) (Note: The march was adopted on 26 June 1931.)

Karlsborg Artillery Regiment (Swedish: Karlsborgs artilleriregemente), designation A 9, was a Swedish Army artillery unit which operated between 1920 and 1937. The unit was based in Karlsborg Garrison in Karlsborg, Sweden.

== History ==
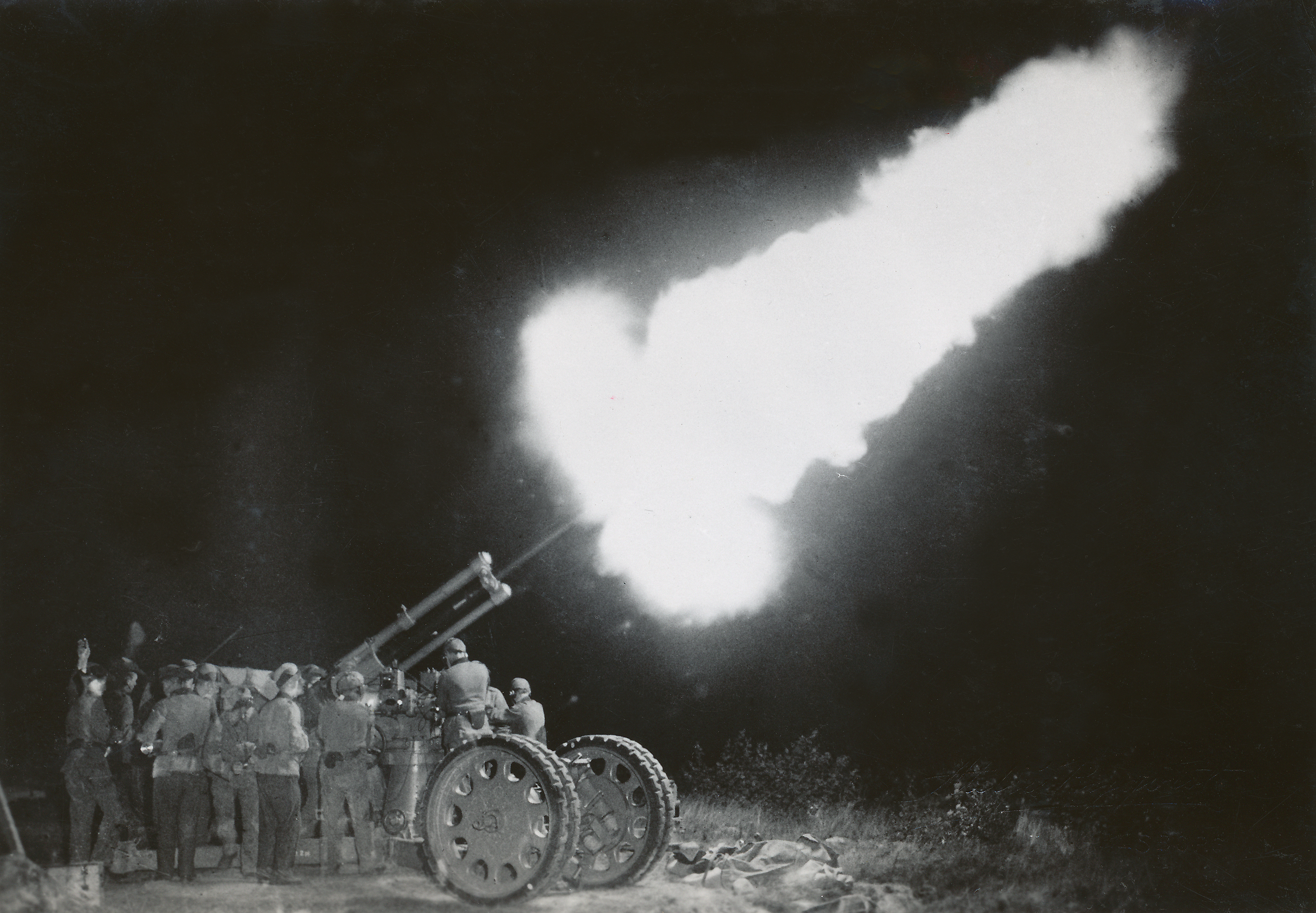
Night shooting with anti-aircraft gun m/30 at A 9 in Karlsborg in 1934 against towed target with illumination of 4 searchlights.

Karlsborg Artillery Regiment originate from Boden-Karlsborg Artillery Regiment (A 8), which was divided into two parts on 1 January 1920; Boden Artillery Regiment (A 8) and Karlsborg Artillery Corps (A 10). In 1921, the first attempts were made with anti-aircraft warfare within the Swedish Army. Through the Defence Act of 1925, it was stated that the searchlight formations and the air defense artillery were to be transferred to the artillery from the Swedish Engineer Troops, and that Karlsborg Artillery Corps would thereby form an air defense artillery regiment.

From 1 January 1928, the artillery corps was reorganized into an artillery regiment. Thus, the new name Karlsborg Artillery Regiment (A 9) was adopted. The regiment thus took over the designation from the Position Artillery Regiment (Positionsartilleriregementet), which was amalgamated with Småland Artillery Regiment (A 6).

Karlsborg Artillery Regiment was not only a leading unit in the development of Swedish air defense, but also the unit that all Swedish air defense units were developed from. On 1 July 1937, the air defense was given an independent position within the artillery. Thus, Karlsborg Artillery Regiment was reorganized into an air defense regiment called Karlsborg Anti-Aircraft Regiment.

== Barracks and training areas ==
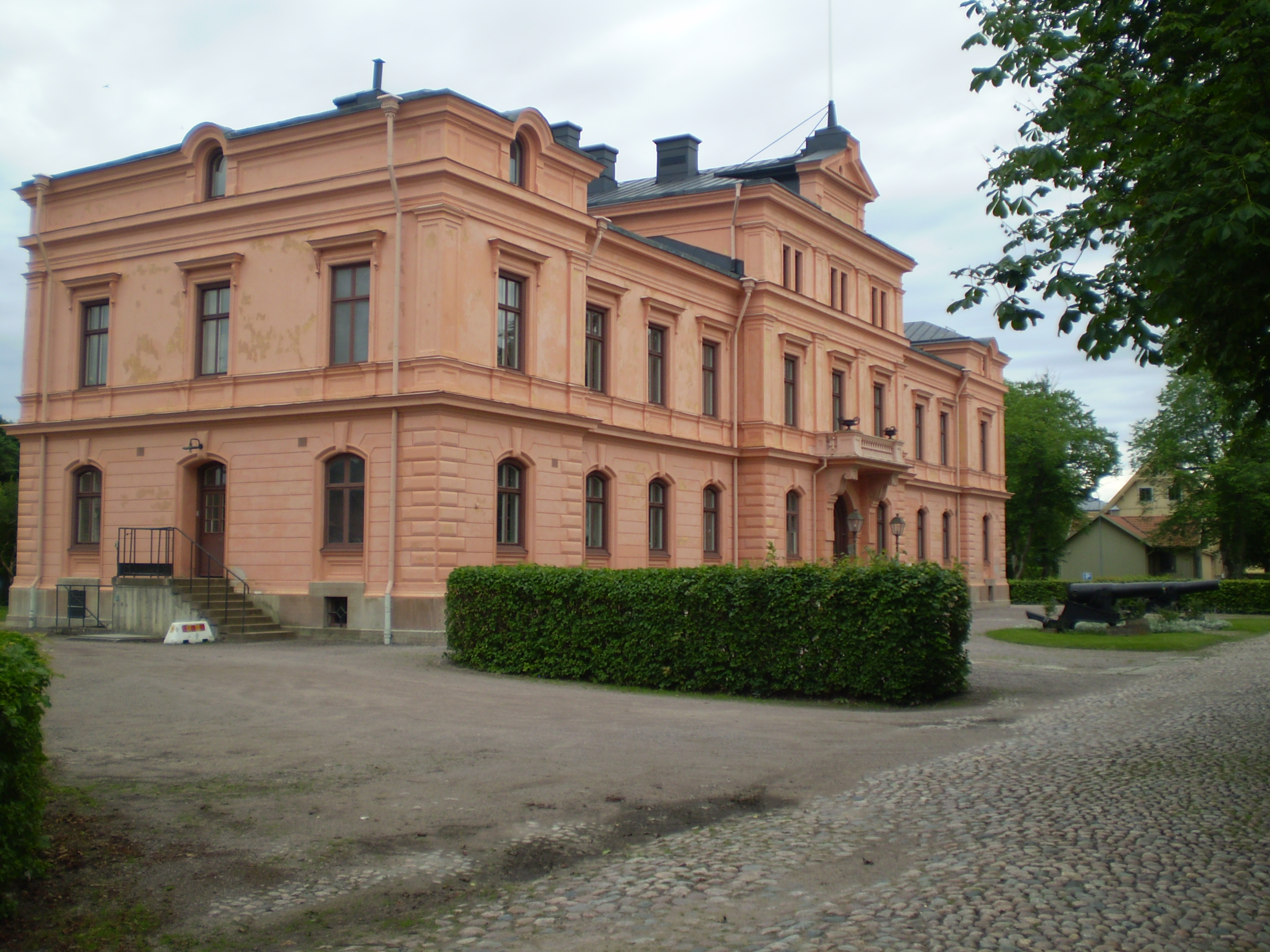
Officer's mess at Karlsborg Fortress.

Karlsborg Artillery Regiment was located at Karlsborg Fortress. The installation was taken over by Karlsborg Air Defense Regiment. In 1961, the installation was taken over within the fortress by the Göta Signal Regiment (S 2). Since 1984, the Life Regiment Hussars (K 3) are housed in the fortress.

== Heraldry and traditions ==
=== Colours, standards and guidons ===
On 16 June 1938, His Majesty the King Gustaf V on his 80th birthday, presented a standard to the regiment at Ladugårdsgärdet. The standard was carried on by Karlsborg Air Defense Regiment until it was disbanded in 1961. The standard was carried by Göta Signal Regiment (S 2) until 1984. On 8 October 1984, the standard was carried by the Swedish Anti-Aircraft Combat School (Luftvärnsskjutskolan, LvSS).

=== Heritage ===
Since 1 July 2000, the memory of Karlsborg Air Defense Regiment is preserved by the Air Defence Regiment (Lv 6).

== Commanding officers ==
- 1920–1925: Bernhard Andrén
- 1925–1933: Nils Ekelöf
- 1933–1937: Jacques de Laval

== Names, designations and locations ==
Name	Translation	From		To
Kungl. Karlsborgs artillerikår	Royal Karlsborg Artillery Corps	1920-01-01	–	1927-12-31
Kungl. Karlsborgs artilleriregemente	Royal Karlsborg Artillery Regiment	1928-01-01	–	1937-06-30
Designation		From		To
A 10		1920-01-01	–	1927-12-31
A 9		1928-01-01	–	1937-06-30
Location		From		To
Karlsborg Garrison		1920-01-01	–	1937-06-30

== See also ==
- List of Swedish artillery regiments
