= Gösta Gärdin =

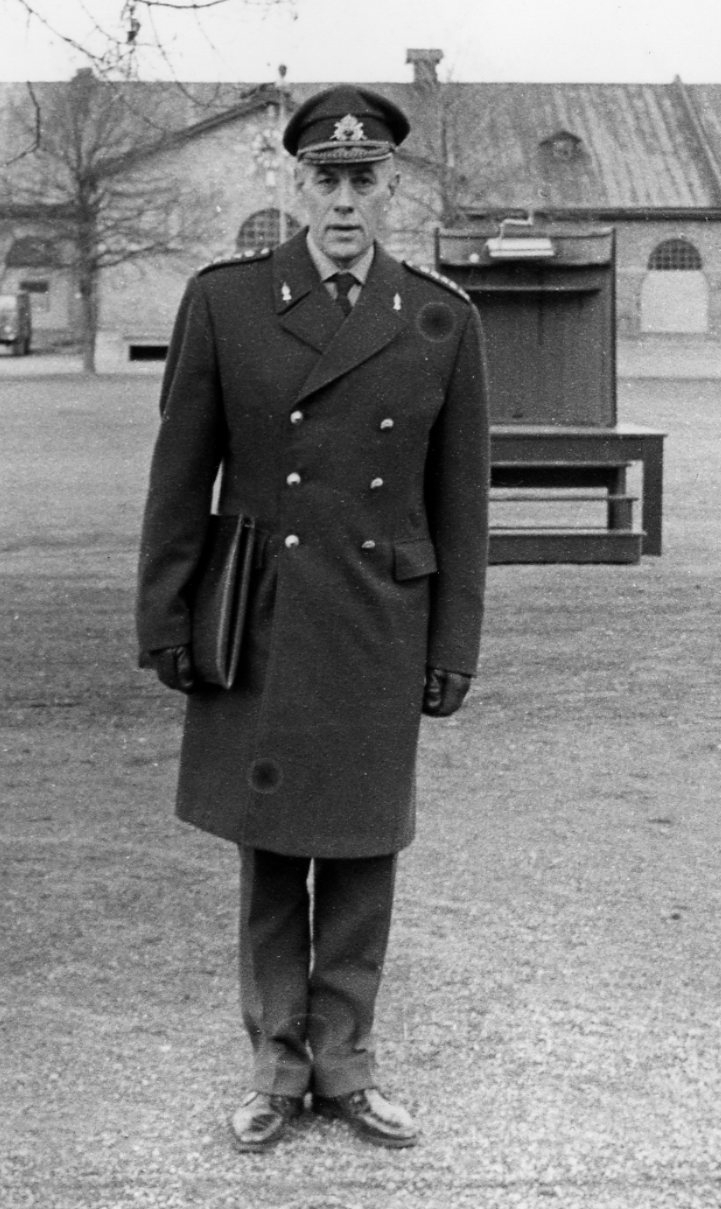
- Gösta Gärdin in 1975.
- Born: 28 May 1923; Linköping, Sweden
- Died: 12 December 2015 (aged 92); Jönköping, Sweden
- Military career
- Allegiance: Sweden
- Branch: Swedish Army
- Service years: 1944–1983
- Rank: Senior colonel
- Commands: Military Academy Karlberg; Småland Artillery Regiment; Inspector of the Artillery and Army Aviation

Gösta Gärdin
Personal information
- Born: 28 May 1923 Linköping, Sweden
- Died: 12 December 2015 (aged 92) Jönköping, Sweden

Sport
- Sport: Modern pentathlon
- Club: A6 IF, Jönköping
Medal record
Representing Sweden
Olympic Games
Bronze medal – third place	1948 London	Individual

Gösta Gärdin (28 May 1923 – 12 December 2015) was a Swedish Army officer and modern pentathlete who won a bronze medal at the 1948 Summer Olympics.

== Career ==
Gärdin was born on 28 May 1923 in Linköping, Sweden, the son of colonel Georg Gärdin and his wife Märta (née Wästfelt). He was commissioned as an officer in 1944 and was assigned as a second lieutenant to Småland Artillery Regiment (A 6) the same year. Gärdin completed the Artillery and Engineering College's higher course from 1949 to 1951. Gärdin became captain in the General Staff Corps in 1956 and major in Boden Artillery Regiment (A 8) in 1962.

He was appointed lieutenant colonel in the General Staff Corps in 1965 and was lieutenant colonel in Svea Artillery Regiment (A 1) 1967. Gärdin was promoted to colonel in 1969 and became head of the Military Academy Karlberg which he was until 1973 when he became the commander of Småland Artillery Regiment (A 6). Gärdin was promoted to senior colonel in 1976 and served as Inspector of the Artillery and Army Aviation in the Army Staff from 1976 to 1983.

== Other work ==
Gärdin was adjutant of His Majesty the King from 1965 to 1969 and was chief adjutant from 1969. He was Sweden's Military Sports Federation's leader of modern pentathlon from 1972 to 1984, chairman of its executive committee from 1978 to 1983 and secretary general from 1983 to 1996. Gärdin was also a member of the executive committee of the International Military Sports Council from 1980 to 1981. Gärdin was a board member of the Swedish Olympic Committee from 1984 to 1996. He was chairman of the Swedish Olympic Academy from 1989 to 2000.

Gärdin joined to the Riksidrottens vänner (Friends of the National Sports) in 1979 and became its chairman in 1989, a position he held for 14 years. He resigned at the annual meeting in 2001 and was then elected honorary chairman. Meanwhile, the scholarship Gösta Gärding's Youth Fund (Gösta Gärdins Ungdomsfond) was established for "a male or female sports leaders, who for many years successfully engaged in youth activities and particularly promoted the understanding of fair play and joy of sport."

== Personal life ==
In 1946 he married Margit Engman (born 1923), daughter of the factory manager Gunnar Engman and Märta (née Johansson).

== Death ==
Gärdin died on 12 December 2015 in Jönköping. The funeral service took place at Gustaf Adolf Church in Stockholm on 22 January 2016.

== Dates of rank ==
- 1944 – Second lieutenant
- 1946 – Lieutenant
- 1956 – Captain
- 1962 – Major
- 1965 – Lieutenant colonel
- 1969 – Colonel
- 1976 – Senior colonel

Military offices
Preceded by Nils-Ivar Carlborg	Military Academy Karlberg; 1969–1973	Succeeded by Bengt Liljestrand
Preceded by Claes Carlsten	Småland Artillery Regiment; 1973–1976	Succeeded by Sten Geijer
Preceded by Tore Rääf	Inspector of the Artillery and Army Aviation; 1976–1983	Succeeded by Håkan Hallgren
