= Karlsborg Anti-Aircraft Regiment =

- Karlsborgs luftvärnsregemente
- Active: 1937–1961
- Country: Sweden
- Allegiance: Swedish Armed Forces
- Branch: Swedish Army
- Type: Artillery (1937–1942); Anti-aircraft (1942–1961)
- Size: Regiment
- Part of: III Army Division (1937–1942); III Military District (1942–1961)
- Garrison/HQ: Karlsborg
- Colors: Dark blue
- March: "Till fronten" (Rydberg) (Note: The march was adopted by Karlsborg Artillery Regiment on den 26 June 1931, and was established as march for the Karlsborg Anti-Aircraft Regiment by Army Order 33/1953.)

Insignia
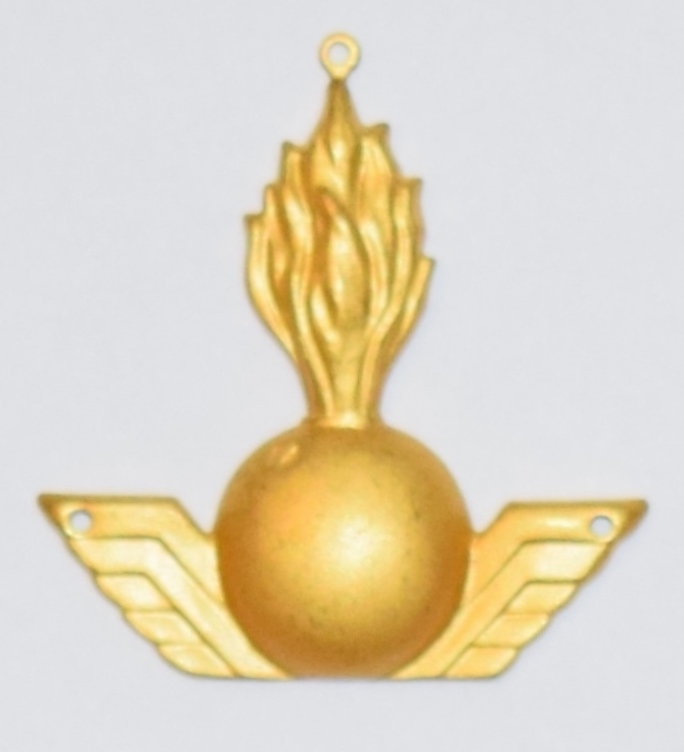
- Branch insignia

Karlsborg Anti-Aircraft Regiment (Swedish: Karlsborgs luftvärnsregemente), also Lv 1, was a Swedish Army anti-aircraft unit that was active in various forms between 1937–1961. The unit was based in Karlsborg.

== History ==
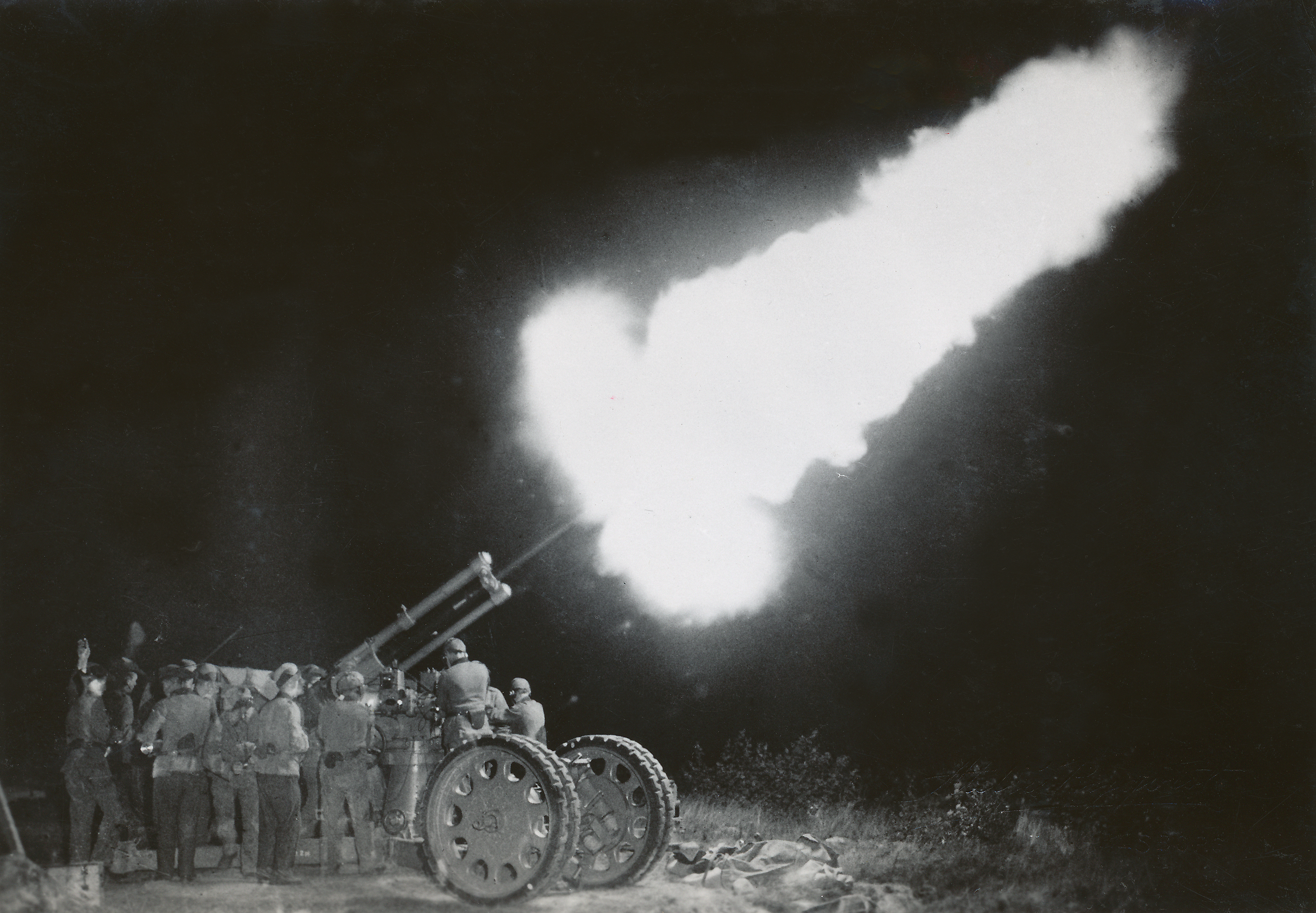
Night shooting with anti-aircraft gun m/30 at A 9 in Karlsborg in 1934 against towed target with illumination of 4 searchlights.

Karlsborg Anti-Aircraft Regiment was raised on 1 July 1937, by reorganizing Karlsborg Artillery Regiment into an anti-aircraft regiment. This was due to the fact that, among other things, the anti-aircraft defense was awarded a more independent position in the artillery. Karlsborg Anti-Aircraft Regiment was a leading unit in the development of Swedish anti-aircraft defense, but together with Östgöta Anti-Aircraft Regiment also became the parent unit for all Swedish anti-aircraft units. That is, it was from the two regiments that the other anti-aircraft units were formed. On 1 October 1942, the anti-aircraft defense was separated from the artillery and formed an independent branch. Karlsborg Anti-Aircraft Regiment thus came transferred to the anti-aircraft defense and adopted the new designation Lv 1, as a mark which branch the regiment belonged to.

Prior to the Defence Act of 1958, the Chief of the Army proposed that Sundsvall Anti-Aircraft Corps (Lv 5) be disbanded. The training in Sundsvall would instead be distributed to other anti-aircraft units, including Luleå Anti-Aircraft Corps (Lv 7) about 500 km north. The background to the proposal was entirely economic, as the Supreme Commande considered that a disbandment of Sundsvall Anti-Aircraft Corps was linked to the inconvenience from the standpoint of preparedness and recruitment. The saving of disbanding Sundsvall Anti-Aircraft Corps was estimated at approximately SEK 0.6 million per year. On 9 February 1959, the Chief of the Army proposed in a letter amending parts of the Defence Act, where he instead proposed that Sundsvall Anti-Aircraft Corps should remain as a peacetime unit. Instead, Karlsborg Anti-Aircraft Regiment would be removed from the peace organization. This with the background that conscripts should as far as possible be trained in probable areas of operation. Furthermore, it was considered that technological developments abroad had increased the opportunities for coup-related attacks. Therefore, it was considered that peacetime units in particularly vulnerable areas of the country would be maintained. What was advocated for maintaining Karlsborg Anti-Aircraft Regiment was good training conditions with the Swedish Air Force, as well as room for an annual training contingent of 800 conscripts, where only the Roslagen Anti-Aircraft Regiment (Lv 3) trained more conscripts on an annual basis. However, the disbandment of Karlsborg Anti-Aircraft Regiment came to affect all anti-aircraft units; this is in the form of a shortage of barracks at the other anti-aircraft units, but also in the form that the establishment in Sundsvall was in need of different function buildings. The total investment requirement for construction work at the other anti-aircraft units was estimated at SEK 4.9 million. In addition, an investment cost of SEK 2 million was added in Karlsborg, when the Signal Battalion in Skövde (S 2) came to relocate to Karlsborg, this in the form of regional political support to the region. On 12 March 1961, the Karlsborg Anti-Aircraft Regiment held a disbandment ceremony and on 31 March 1961, the regiment was officially disbanded.

== Units ==
- Swedish Parachute Ranger School is a former unit within the Swedish Army that trained parachute rangers. The school was founded in 1952 and located in Karlsborg. The school was administered from 1952 to 1961 by the Karlsborg Anti-Aircraft Regiment (Lv 1). Before Karlsborg Anti-Aircraft Regiment was to be disbanded, the Swedish Armed Forces had investigated the possibilities and consequences of connecting the school administratively and in terms of location to Västgöta Wing. However, it was decided instead that from 1 April 1961 the school would be subject to the Göta Signal Corps (S 2). However, Älvsborg Regiment (I 15) was the so-called troop registration authority (truppregistreringsmyndighet) for the school's conscripts. In connection with the relocation of the Life Regiment Hussars (K 3) to Karlsborg, from 1 July 1984 the school became part of the Life Regiment Hussars. Since 2009, the Swedish Parachute Ranger School has been disbanded, and the included parts were shared between the Särskilda operationsgruppen and the 32nd Intelligence Battalion.

== Locations and training areas ==
=== Barracks ===
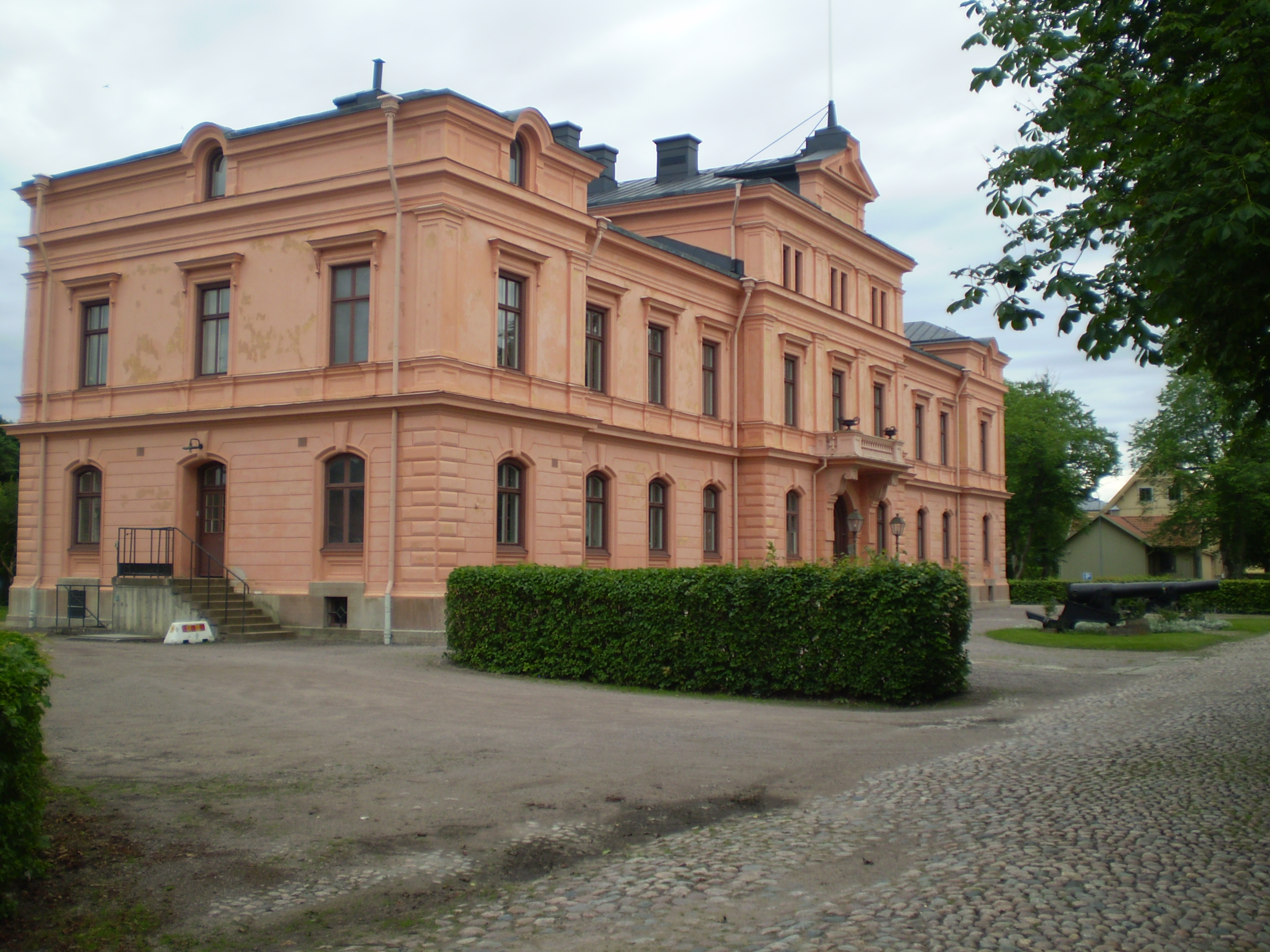
Officer's mess at Karlsborg Fortress.

The Karlsborg Anti-Aircraft Regiment was located at Karlsborg Fortress. After the regiment was disbanded, its location was taken over on 1 April 1961 by the Signal Battalion in Skövde (S 2), which at the same time adopted the name Göta Signal Corps (S 2). Since 1 July 1984, the Life Regiment Hussars (K 3) have been placed in the fortress.

=== Detachments ===
==== Boden/Luleå ====
On 20 June 1941, a preparedness division from the regiment was detached to Boden. The detachment adopted the name Boden Anti-Aircraft Division (Bodens luftvärnsdivision, A 9 B). On 1 October 1941, the detachment was transferred to Luleå and was named Luleå Anti-Aircraft Division (Luleå luftvärnsdivision, A 9 L). From 1 October 1942, the detachment was separated from the Karlsborg Anti-Aircraft Regiment and formed Luleå Anti-Aircraft Corps (Lv 7).

==== Gothenburg ====
On 1 October 1941, a preparedness division from the regiment was detached to Gothenburg. On 1 October 1942, the detachment was separated from the regiment and formed the Göta Anti-Aircraft Corps (Lv 6).

==== Karlstad ====
On 7 February 1943, the Karlsborg Anti-Aircraft Regiment placed a mobilization center in Karlstad (Lv 1 K). The center was located in Sörmon, just over 10 km west of Karlstad. On 30 June 1953, the mobilization center was disbanded and instead went on to act as a mobilization storehouse.

== Heraldry and traditions ==
=== Colours, standards and guidons ===
On 16 June 1938, the Karlsborg Artillery Regiment was presented with its standard at Ladugårdsgärdet in Stockholm by His Majesty the King Gustaf V on his 80th birthday. The standard was carried on by Karlsborg Anti-Aircraft Regiment until it was disbanded in 1961. Then, until 1984, it was carried by Göta Signal Regiment (S 2). On 8 October 1984, it was taken over by the Swedish Anti-Aircraft Combat School (Luftvärnsskjutskolan, LvSS).

=== Heritage ===
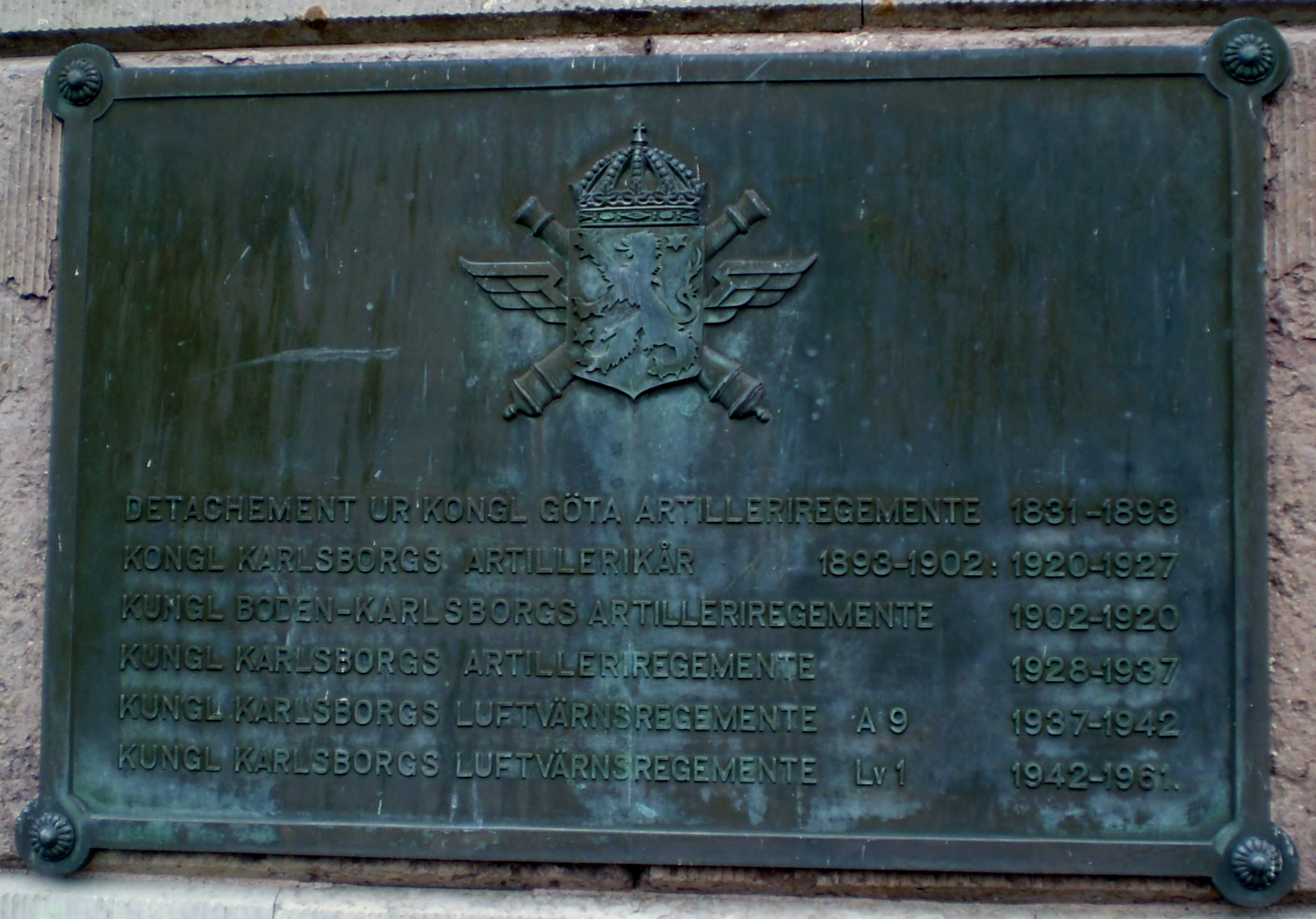
Commemorative plaque on the Fortress Church of A 10, A 9 and Lv 1.

Since 1 July 2000, the memory of the Karlsborg Anti-Aircraft Regiment has been preserved by the Air Defence Regiment (Lv 6).

== Commanding officers ==
- 1937–1938: Jacques de Laval
- 1938–1941: Ragnar Sjöberg
- 1941–1946: Einar Hellström
- 1946–1953: Bengt Bengtsson
- 1953–1957: Sven Tilly
- 1957–1960: Nils Kahlén
- 1960–1961: Lars Bratt

== Names, designations and locations ==
Name	Translation	From		To
Kungl. Karlsborgs luftvärnsregemente	Royal Karlsborg Anti-Aircraft Regiment	1937-07-01	–	1961-03-31
Designation		From		To
A 9		1937-07-01	–	1942-09-30
Lv 1		1942-10-01	–	1961-03-31
Location		From		To
Karlsborg Garrison		1937-07-01	–	1961-03-31

== See also ==
- List of Swedish anti-aircraft regiments
