= Finnish Artillery Regiment =

- Finska artilleriregementet
- Active: 1794–1811
- Country: Sweden
- Branch: Swedish Army
- Type: Artillery
- Size: Regiment

The Finnish Artillery Regiment (Swedish: Finska artilleriregementet, Finnish: Suomen tykistörykmentti), designated A 4, was an artillery regiment of the Swedish Army, that traced its origins back to the 17th century. It was disbanded in 1811. The regiment's soldiers were recruited from Finland, and it was also garrisoned there.

== History ==
The regiment has its origins in the Artillery Regiment raised in 1636. That regiment was split into four new regiments in 1794 of which the Finnish Artillery Regiment was one. It was mainly garrisoned in Helsinki. Part of the regiment was transferred to Sweden and was garrisoned in Gävle as the Former Finnish Artillery Regiment after the Finnish War in 1809. The regiment was then disbanded two years later in 1811 when two companies were incorporated into Svea Artillery Regiment and three companies were incorporated into Wendes Artillery Regiment.

The present-day Artillery Brigade of the Finnish Defence Forces considers itself a successor unit of the Finska artilleriregementet.

== Campaigns ==
- ?

== Organisation ==
- ?

== Name, designation and garrison ==
Name	Translation	From		To
Finska artilleriregementet	Finnish Artillery Regiment	1794-06-23	–	1809
F d finska artilleriregementet	Former Finnish Artillery Regiment	1809	–	1811

Designation	From		To
No designation		–	

Training ground or garrison town	From		To
Helsinki (G)	1794-06-23	–	1809
Gävle (G)	1809	–	1811

== See also ==
- List of Swedish regiments
- Provinces of Sweden
