= Wendes Artillery Regiment =

Swedish Army artillery regiment

- Wendes artilleriregemente
- Active: 1794–2000
- Country: Sweden
- Allegiance: Swedish Armed Forces
- Branch: Swedish Army
- Type: Artillery
- Size: Regiment
- Part of: List: 1st Military District (1833–1893); I Army Division (1893–1901); I Army Division (1902–1927); Southern Army Division (1928–1936); I Army Division (1937–1942); I Military District (1942–1966); Milo S (1966–2000)
- Garrison/HQ: Hässleholm
- Motto: Nulli secundus ("Second to none")
- Colors: Blue and white
- March: "Siegestrophäen" (Friedemann) (Note: The march was established in 1953 by Army Order 33/1953.)
- Anniversaries: 6 September (Note: 6 September is the anniversary of the Battle of Dennewitz.); 4 December (Note: 4 December is saint day of Saint Barbara.)
- Battle honours: Großbeeren (1813); Dennewitz (1813); Leipzig (1813)

Insignia
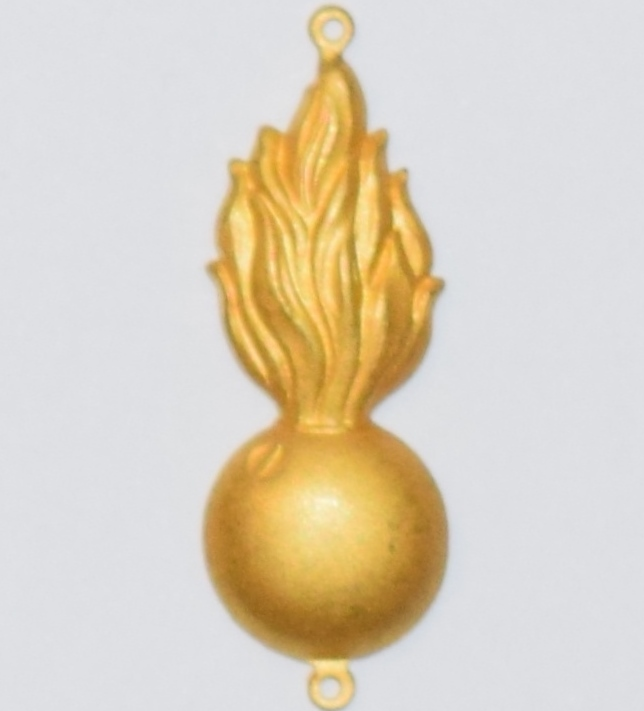
- Branch insignia

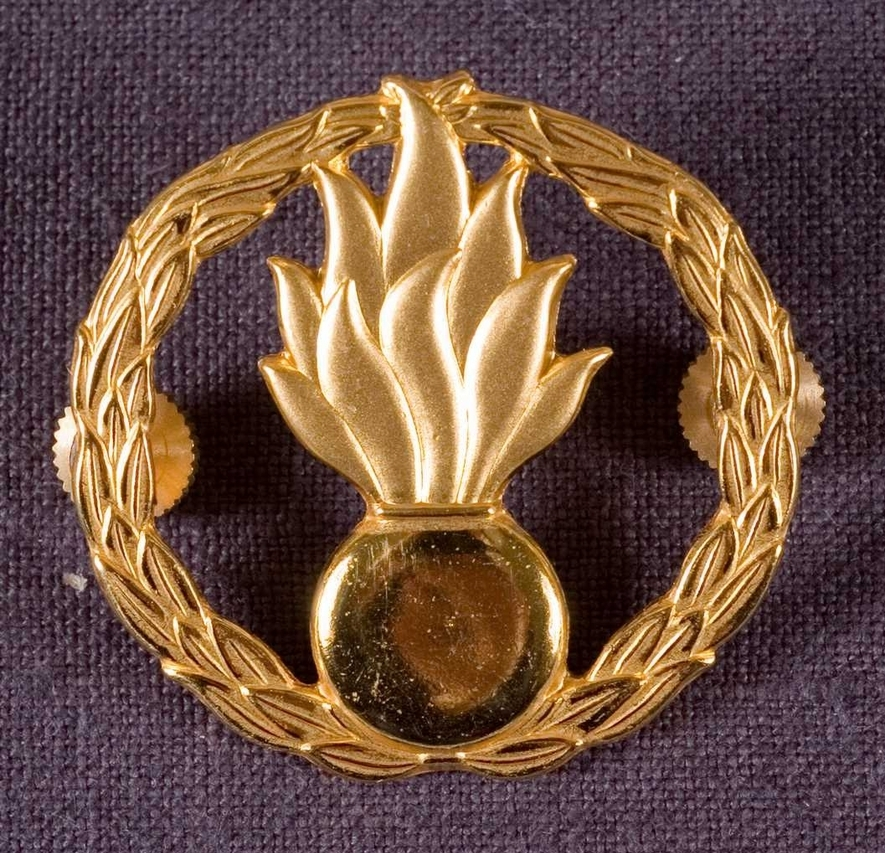
- Cap badge

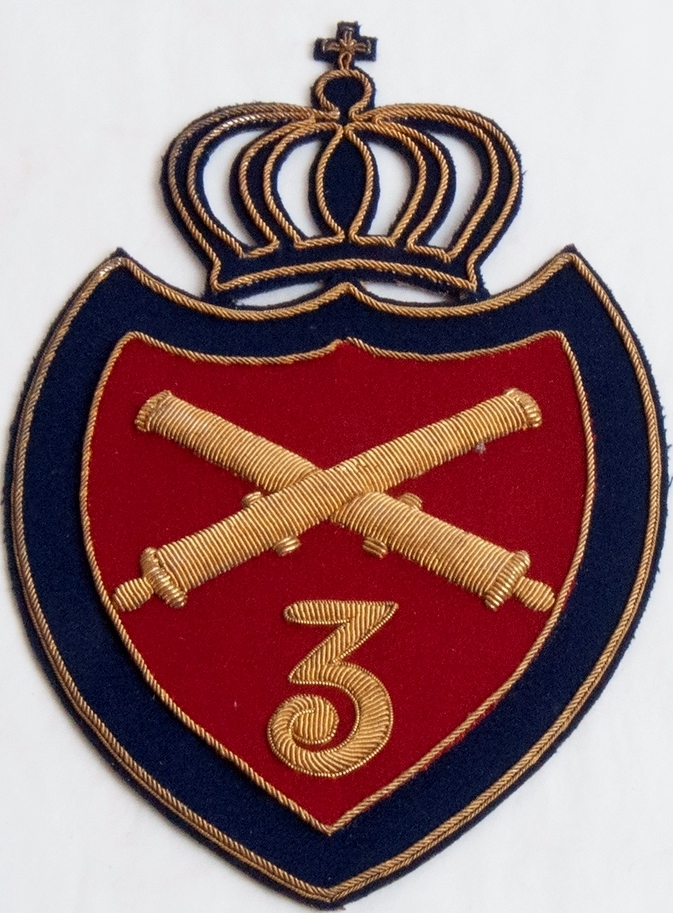
- Shoulder sleeve insignia m/1906

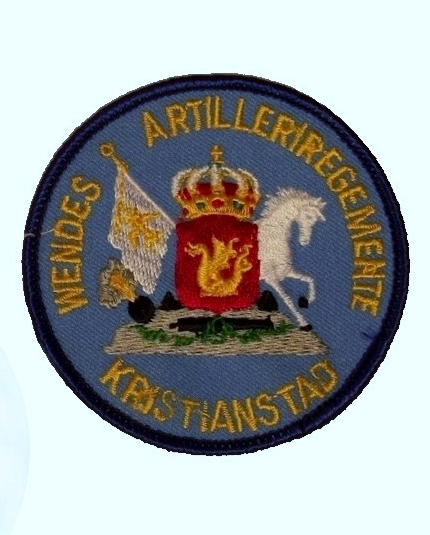
- Shoulder sleeve insignia

The Wendes Artillery Regiment (Swedish: Wendes artilleriregemente), designation A 3, was a Swedish Army artillery regiment that traced its origins back to the 17th century. The regiment's soldiers were originally recruited from Scania, where it was garrisoned. The unit was disbanded as a result of the disarmament policies set forward in the Defence Act of 2000.

== History ==
The regiment has its origins in the Artillery Regiment raised in 1636. That regiment was split into four new regiments in 1794 of which Wendes Artillery Regiment was one. The regiment was given the designation A 3 (3rd Artillery Regiment) in 1830. In 1893 two companies were split off to form 2nd Svea Artillery Regiment and 2nd Göta Artillery Regiment. The regiment was garrisoned in Kristianstad but moved to Norra Åsum in 1953 and to Hässleholm in 1994 before being disbanded in 2000.

== Campaigns ==
- ?

== Organisation ==
- ?

== Heraldry and traditions ==
=== Colours, standards and guidons ===
The standard of Wendes Artillery Regiment was embroidered by hand by mademoiselle Anette Bergner and presented as an honorary standard to the former mounted division of the Royal Wendes Artillery Regiment (A 3) in 1815. It was used as regimental standard by A 3 until 1 July 2000. Blazon: "On white cloth a winged cluster of flashes clasped by a hand under a royal crown proper, wings brown, crown and flash-cluster in yellow. In each corner a slanted open yellow crown. Yellow battle honours (Großbeeren 1813, Leipzig 1813, Dennewitz 1813) on the three lower sides of the standard. Fringe in white and yellow." Today it is presented as the second standard of the Artillery Regiment.

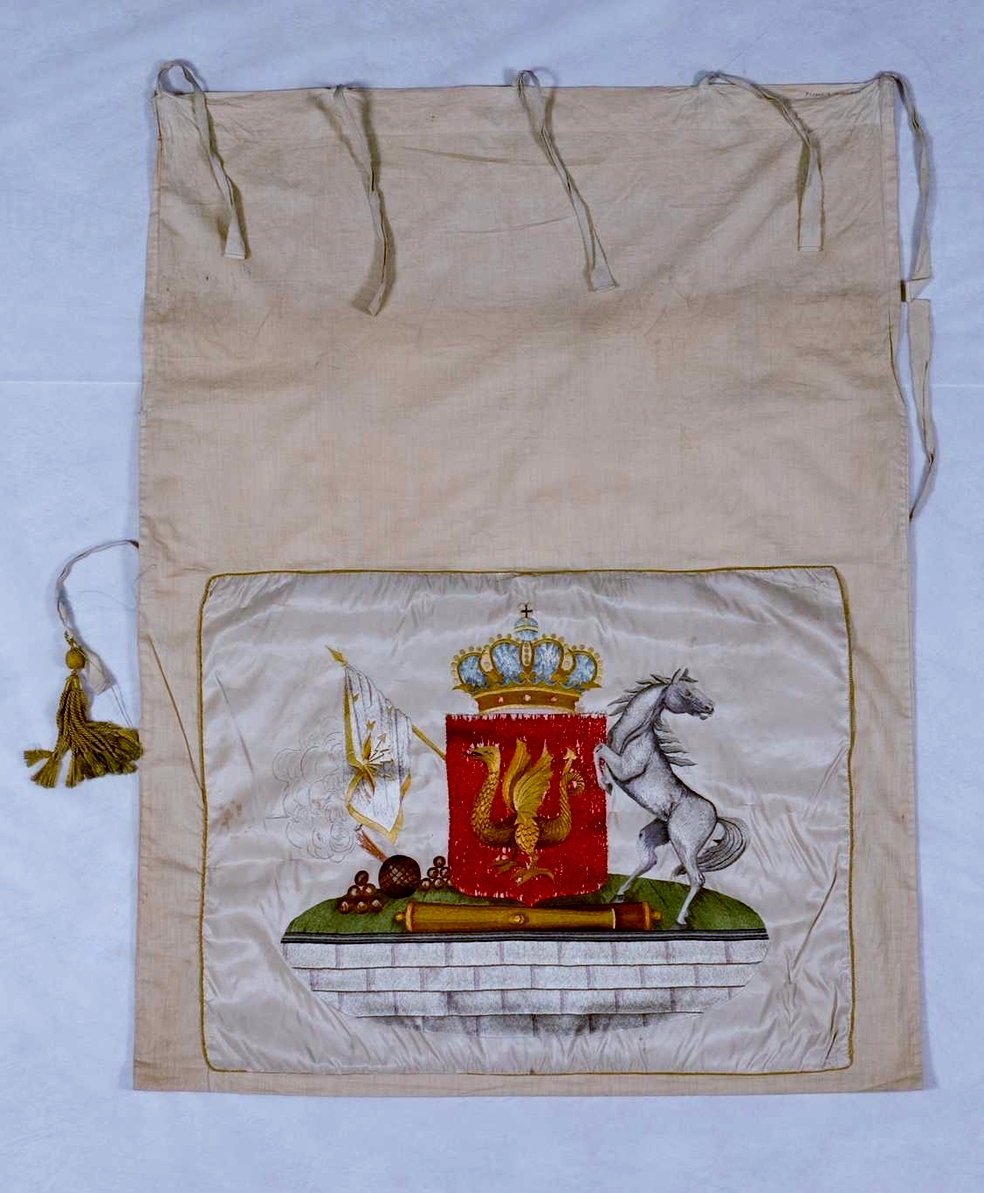
Regimental standard

=== Coat of arms ===
The coat of the arms of the Wendes Artillery Regiment (A 3) 1977–2000. Blazon: "Gules, the regimental badge, a wyvern or, armed and langued azure. The shield surmounted two gunbarrels of older pattern in saltire or. The gunbarrels may be sable".

== Commanding officers ==
- 1794–1797: C C Gyllenstierna
- 1797–1804: C Armfelt
- 1804–1807: J Norby
- 1807–1821: Carl Friedrich von Cardell
- 1821–1822: C A Hägerflycht
- 1822–1845: A G von Arbin
- 1845–1860: David Wilhelm Silfverstolpe
- 1860–1866: A Wachtmeister
- 1866–1871: C M Skytte
- 1871–1882: G M von Arbin
- 1882–1883: H E R Rehbinder
- 1883–1891: A O Ankarcrona
- 1891–1895: C A Francke
- 1895–1911: Fredrik Johan Leth
- 1903–1911: T J Dyrssen
- 1911–1918: Karl Toll
- 1918–1919: G A Lundeberg (acting)
- 1919–1922: Bo Tarras-Wahlberg
- 1922–1927: Lennart Lilliehöök
- 1928–1932: Thor Lagerheim
- 1932–1935: Sture Gadd
- 1935–1940: Hugo Gadd
- 1940–1945: Knut Gyllenstierna
- 1945–1950: Tor Hedqvist
- 1950–1951: Karl Ångström
- 1951–1954: Erik Kihlblom
- 1954–1957: Alarik Bergman
- 1957–1961: Nils Söderberg
- 1961–1963: Stig Löfgren
- 1963–1966: Stig Magneberg
- 1966–1966: Carl Arcadius Holger Areskoug (acting)
- 1966–1967: Harald Smith
- 1967–1978: Valter Thomé
- 1978–1986: Hans Richter
- 1986–1993: Leif Mårtensson
- 1993–1994: Kjell Åke Plantin (acting)
- 1994–1995: Kjell Åke Plantin
- 1995–2000: Rolf Ohrlander

== Names, designations and locations ==
Name	Translation	From		To
Kungl Wendes artilleriregemente	Royal Wendes Artillery Regiment	1794-06-23	–	1974-12-31
Wendes artilleriregemente	Wendes Artillery Regiment	1975-01-01	–	2000-06-30
Avvecklingsorganisation	Decommissioning Organisation	2000-07-01	–	2001-06-30
Designation		From		To
No. 3		1830-??-??	–	1914-09-30
A 3		1914-10-01	–	2000-06-30
Location		From		To
Kristianstad Garrison		1794-06-23	–	1994-06-30
Stralsund Garrison		1794-06-23	–	1814-12-31
Hässleholm Garrison		1994-07-01	–	2000-06-30

== See also ==
- List of Swedish artillery regiments
