= Artillery Regiment (2000) =

- Artilleriregementet
- Active: 2000–2021
- Country: Sweden
- Allegiance: Swedish Armed Forces
- Branch: Swedish Army
- Type: Artillery
- Size: Regiment
- Part of: OPIL (2000–2004); SAFHQ (2004–2021)
- Garrison/HQ: Boden Garrison
- Motto: Ultima ratio regum (Note: The quote originates from artillery in Europe.) ("The Last Argument of Kings")
- Colors: Red
- March: "Artilleri V" (Ström) (Note: The Artillery Regiment took over the march established in 1953 from Bergslagen Artillery Regiment, who in turn inherited it from Uppland Artillery Regiment.)
- Battle honours: Breitenfeld (1631), Lech (1632), Lützen (1632), Jankowitz (1645), Tåget över Bält (1658), Helsingborg (1710), Gadebusch (1712), Svensksund (1790), Leipzig (1813), Großbeeren (1813), Dennewitz (1813)

Insignia
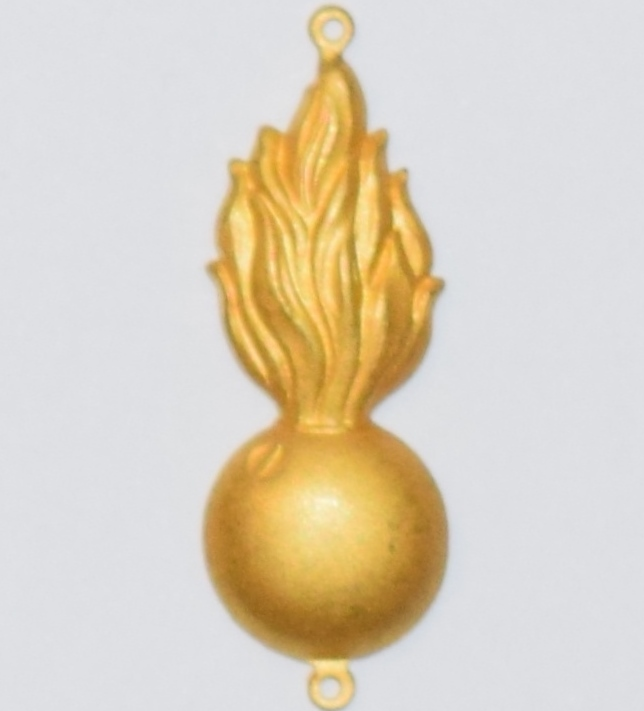
- Branch insignia

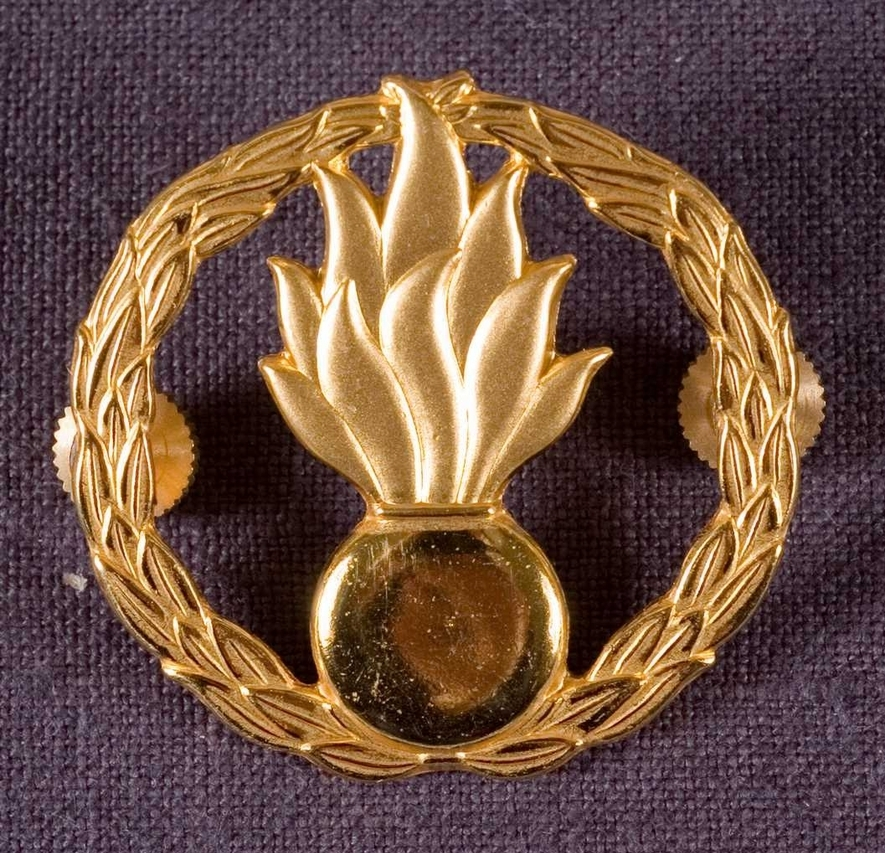
- Cap badge

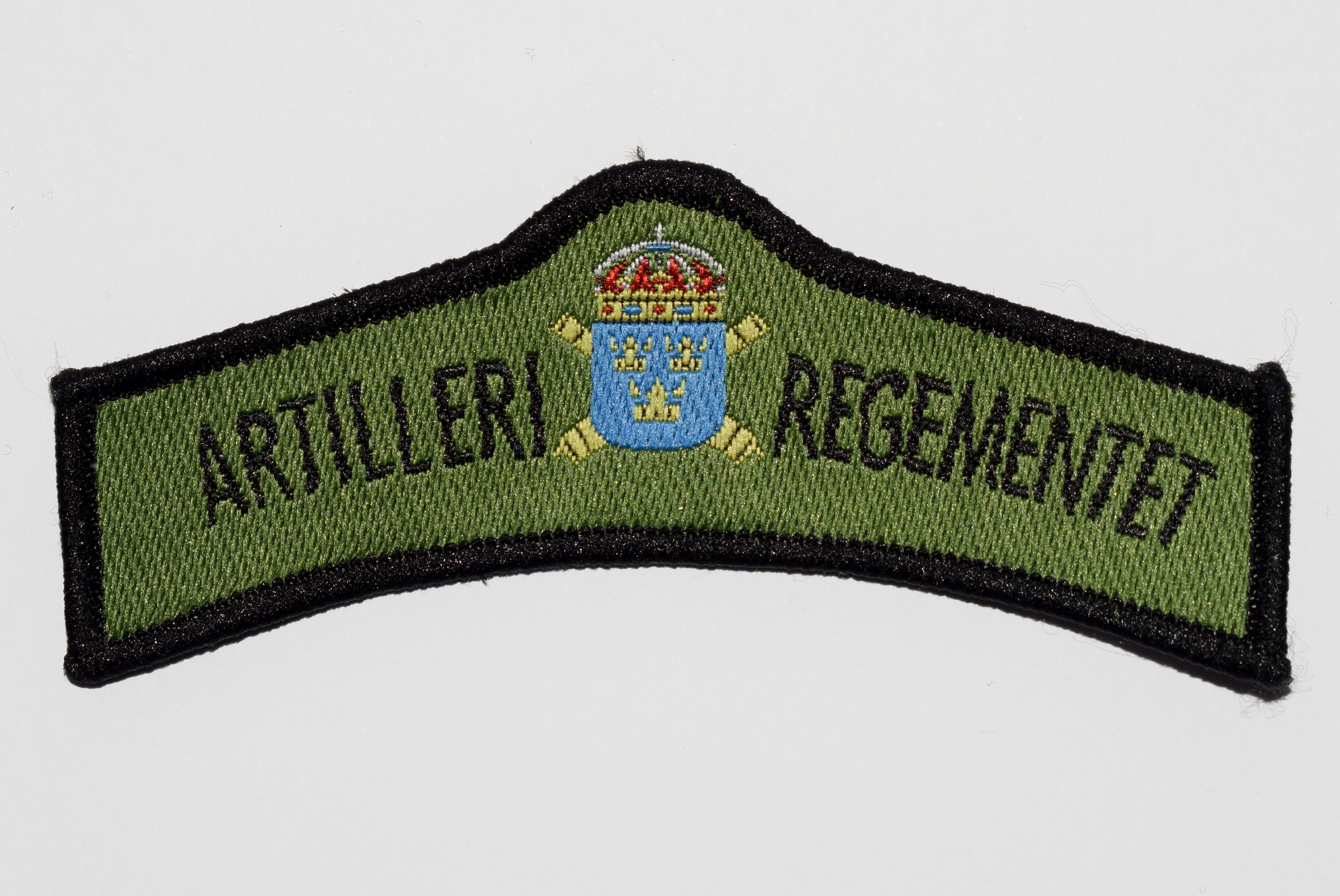
- Unit tab

The Artillery Regiment (Swedish: Artilleriregementet, A 9) was an artillery regiment of the Swedish Army based in Boden Garrison in Boden, Sweden. The regiment was formed as the Artillery Regiment by bringing together all the artillery regiments of the Swedish Army, and it took its designation A 9 from the Bergslagen Artillery Regiment. The regiment carried the battle honours of all past Swedish artillery regiments. Its new organisation was founded in 2000 in Kristinehamn and in 2005 the regiment was moved to Boden. Due to the re-raising of Bergslagen Artillery Regiment (A 9) in 2022, the Artillery Regiment was renamed Boden Artillery Regiment and took the designation A 8 from the old Boden Artillery Regiment which was active from 1906 to 1997.

== History ==
Through the Defence Act of 2000, the Swedish government considered that only four artillery battalions were needed in the future "operational defence" (Swedish: insatsförsvar). What was clear before the Defence Act was that Wendes Artillery Regiment (A 3) and Gotland Artillery Regiment (A 7) would be disbanded. Which regiment was to be retained in the future organisation was between Norrland Artillery Regiment (A 8) and Bergslagen Artillery Regiment (A 9). What spoke in favor of retaining A 8, was the direct proximity to training areas, as well as a possible garrison coordination and collaboration with mainly Norrbotten Regiment and Norrbotten Brigade (MekB 19). What spoke in favor of a disbandment was large distances and limited opportunities to co-operate with the majority of the ground forces and schools for officer training. What spoke in favor of maintaining A 9 in Kristinehamn was the proximity to Älvdalen's training area and the possibility of joint training with a large number of units in southern and central Sweden but also that Kristinehamn already constituted a competence center for the artillery branch through the Artillery Combat School (Artilleriets stridsskola, ArtSS) which was already located in Kristinehamn. The government thus chose to propose a disbandment of Norrland Artillery Regiment (A 8). In the same proposal, the government considered it important that artillery units were also given winter capability. Thus, an artillery battalion would be retained in Boden, and placed under Norrbotten Regiment (I 19). As the only remaining active regiment in the Swedish artillery, Bergslagen Artillery Regiment adopted the name after the original Artillery Regiment on 1 July 2000. The body within the new regiment consisted of Bergslagen Artillery Regiment and the Artillery Combat School. At this time, a full artillery battalion of Haubits FH77 B was trained each year. Three battalions were trained in Kristinehamn, Bergslagens, Svea and Wendes artillery battalion. On 30 June, Norrland Artillery Regiment (A 8) was also disbanded as an independent unit. From 1 July 2000, the artillery battalion was incorporated as a training battalion in the Norrbotten Regiment (I 19). The new battalion adopted the name Norrland Artillery Battalion (Artbat/I 19). The battalion consisted of a battalion staff, an artillery company and a staff company. According to the Defence Act, the activities of the artillery battalion should, as far as possible, be a mirror image of the Artillery Regiment (A 9) but on a smaller scale. The new artillery battalion came to consist of twelve towed Haubits FH77 B. Bandkanon 1 was never adopted in the new organization, but began to be phased out and was completely phased out in 2003.

Swedish Artillery Regiment (A 9) demonstrates the highly mobile Archer Artillery System on 15 Nov. 2021, at Camp Atterbury.

The Defence Act of 2004 decided that the artillery regiment staff would be disbanded and that the organization would be reduced by three 77B artillery battalions, and that only one geographical location would be retained for artillery training. In organization, one 77B howitzer battalion would be maintained in low readiness, and that the 77BD howitzer battalion would be organized no earlier than 2010. In the government's consideration regarding the artillery of the future, it was considered that Kristinehamn had a limited activity in one place. Kristinehamn thus had limited opportunities for joint exercise with other functions within the army. Regarding Boden, the Swedish government considered that the site had a more suitable infrastructure and general competence for artillery training. Furthermore, Boden with Norrbotten Regiment (I 19) was an integrated platform with training of several functions, and had a proximity to Norrbotten Wing (F 21) in Luleå. Furthermore, it was considered that locating the artillery to Boden would secure the troop's subarctic capability. Thus, the government proposed to the Riksdag in its Bill 2004/05:5 that the Artillery Regiment should be relocated from Kristinehamn to Boden. Furthermore, the artillery battalion at Norrbotten Regiment (I 19) was to be disbanded and placed in the Artillery Regiment. On 31 August 2005, the regimental staff left Kristinehamn, this through a disbandment ceremony. The ceremony also marked the end of the military operations in Värmland, when personnel from the Swedish Armed Forces Logistics and the Swedish Armed Forces Medical Center also took part in the ceremony. The remaining operations in Kristinehamn were transferred to a decommissioning organization, which was to be completely disbanded on 31 December 2005. From 1 September 2005, the regimental staff worked from Boden. On 2 September 2005, a ceremony was held at the regiment's new barracks area. The purpose of the ceremony was to mark that a new regiment was located at Boden, and that it was not an old regiment that had re-emerged. On 20 December 2016, the artillery battalion symbolically marched into the barracks area of the Artillery Regiment and from 1 January 2006, the artillery battalion was transferred from Norrbotten Regiment to be part of the Artillery Regiment (A 9) in Boden.

On 14 May 2019, the Swedish Parliamentary Defence Commission (Defense Committee) submitted its final report to the Swedish government, proposing how the military defense would develop in the years 2021–2025. The Defence Commission proposed, among other things, that artillery training be established in Kristinehamn and in Villingsberg. The Swedish Armed Forces carried out an analysis of the Defence Commission's final report Värnkraft, in which the Swedish Armed Forces also proposed that artillery training be expanded. However, the Swedish Armed Forces considered that Skövde garrison with Villingsbergs training area would be the basis for training artillery units in southern Sweden. That is, the Swedish Armed Forces did not share the Defence Commission's view on re-establishing the artillery in Kristinehamn. On 7 July 2020, the Swedish government announced that it had requested a supplementary budget document for 2021 from the Swedish Armed Forces. In the assignment, the Swedish Armed Forces would adjust the budget base for 2021, including that a divisional artillery battalion with artillery guns would be located from 2021 to Kristinehamn and Villingsberg. Kristinehamn was pointed out as the place of training and Villingsberg as the training area. The Swedish government's goal was for the establishment to begin in the period 2021–2025 and reach full capacity before 2030. On 17 July 2020, the Swedish Armed Forces responded to the government's assignment, where it was proposed regarding the basic organization to locate artillery training entirely to Villingsberg, instead of a shared location with Kristinehamn, as Villingsberg largely already has existing infrastructure, training areas, locations and training facilities which may correspond to the scope of the training. In Kristinehamn, there were risks regarding environmental permits regarding shooting and training activities and that the former garrison area is owned by a private player and thus used for other purposes. In the event that an establishment in Kristinehamn was to be implemented, the Swedish Armed Forces considered that a feasible proposal must first be concretized, which they themselves reported to the budget base in 2022.

Prior to Defence Act of 2020, the Swedish government presented an agreement on 12 October 2020, regarding the re-establishment of Bergslagen Artillery Regiment in Kristinehamn with Villingsberg as the training area. The government stated that Bergslagen's Artillery Regiment (A 9) in Kristinehamn would be re-established to train two to three artillery battalions for, among others, the brigades in southern Sweden. Bergslagen Artillery Regiment was proposed by the government to begin re-establishment in the years 2021–2025, in order to reach full capacity during the years 2026–2030. It was further proposed that the Artillery Regiment in Boden should be named Boden Artillery Regiment (A 8). By 1 March 2021, the Swedish Armed Forces would report the agency's planning to the Government Offices (Ministry of Defence) on the re-establishment of Bergslagen Artillery Regiment. On 26 February 2021, the Swedish Armed Forces presented its budget documentation for 2022, in which the Swedish Armed Forces presented its planning, preparations and activities in order to be able to re-establish the regiments designated by the Defence Act. Bergslagen Artillery Regiment was proposed to be established from 1 January 2025. Furthermore, the Swedish Armed Forces proposed that the Artillery Regiment (A 9) in Boden, from 1 January 2022, change its name to Boden Artillery Regiment (A 8). The Defence Act of 2020, however, meant that the Artillery Regiment was divided into two regiments. One was re-established in Kristinehamn with unchanged traditional responsibility under the new old name Bergslagen Artillery Regiment (A 9). The second regiment regains the name Boden Artillery Regiment (A 8) with unchanged traditional responsibility from the older regiment from 1919. The Artillery Regiment will thus be disbanded on 31 December 2021 and on 1 January 2022 re-established Boden Artillery Regiment.

== Organisation ==
The current organisation of the regiment is:

- Regimental Staff, in Boden
- Artillery Battalion (Artilleribataljonen)
- 91st Artillery Battalion (91. Artilleribataljon)
- 92nd Artillery Battalion (92. Artilleribataljon)
- Artillery Combat School (Artilleriets Stridsskola)

== Heraldry and traditions ==
=== Colours, standards and guidons ===
The Artillery Reginent presents two regimental standards and one school colour.

==== First standard of A 9 ====
The first standard was drawn by Kristina Holmgård-Åkerberg and embroidered by hand in insertion technique by Maj-Britt Salander/company Blå Kusten. The colour was presented to the regiment in Kristinehamn by His Majesty the King Carl XVI Gustaf on 14 May 2002. Blazon: "On blue cloth in the centre the lesser coat of arms of Sweden, three open yellow crowns placed two and one. In the first corner the provincial badge of Värmland; a white eagle, wings elevated and displayed, armed red and yellow, over an iron sign (a legacy from the then Bergslagen Artillery Regiment, A 9), in the second corner the provincial badge of Småland; a yellow lion rampant, armed and langued red, in the forepaws a yellow crossbow (a legacy from the former Småland Artillery Regiment, A 5), in the third corner a yellow wyvern, armed red (a legacy from the former Wendes Artillery Regiment, A 3) and in the fourth corner the provincial badge of Gotland; a white ram passant, arms and crosstaff yellow, and a red banner with edging and five flaps yellow (a legacy from the former Gotland Artillery Regiment, A 7). On the reverse side battle honours (Breitenfeld 1631, Lech 1632, Lützen 1632, Jankowitz 1645, Tåget över Bält 1658, Helsingborg 1710, Gadebusch 1712, Svensksund 1790) and in each corner two gunbarrels of older pattern in saltire, all yellow. Blue fringe."

==== Second standard of A 9 ====
The second standard is embroidered by hand by mademoiselle Anette Bergner and presented as an honorary standard to the former mounted division of the Royal Wendes Artillery Regiment (A 3) in 1815. It was used as regimental standard by A 3 until 1 July 2000. Blazon: "On white cloth a winged cluster of flashes clasped by a hand under a royal crown proper, wings brown, crown and flash-cluster in yellow. In each corner a slanted open yellow crown. Yellow battle honours (Großbeeren 1813, Leipzig 1813, Dennewitz 1813) on the three lower sides of the standard. Fringe in white and yellow."

==== Colour of Artillery Combat School ====
The colour of the Artillery Combat School (Artilleriets stridsskolas, ArtSS) is a double swallow-tailed Swedish flag. The colour may be presented according to the decisions of the commanding officer of A 9.

=== Coat of arms ===
The coat of the arms of the Artillery Regiment (A 9) since 2000. Blazon: "Azure, the lesser coat of arms of Sweden, three open crowns or, placed two and one. The shield surmounted two gunbarrels of older pattern in saltire or. The gunbarrels may be sable".

=== Medals ===
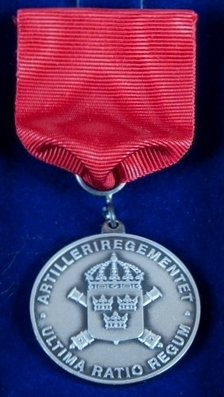
The Artillery Regiment (A 9) Medal of Merit in silver.

In 2001, the Artilleriregementets (A 9) förtjänstmedalj ("Artillery Regiment (A 9) Medal of Merit") in gold and silver (ArtregGM/SM) was established. The medal ribbon is of red moiré.

== Commanding officers ==
=== Commanders ===
- 2000–2002: Colonel Anders Carell
- 2002–2006: Colonel Göran Mårtensson
- 2006–2010: Colonel Torbjörn Larsson
- 2010–2014: Colonel Anders Callert
- 2014–2014: Lieutenant Colonel Stefan Fredriksson (acting)
- 2014–2016: Colonel Johan Pekkari (from 1 September 2014)
- 2016–present: Colonel Jonas Lotsne
- 2019–2019: Lieutenant Colonel Anders Högrell (acting)
- 2019–2021: Colonel Magnus Ståhl

=== Deputy commanders ===
- 2000–2004: Colonel Mats Klintäng

== Names, designations and locations ==
Name	Translation	From		To
Artilleriregementet	Artillery Regiment	2000-07-01	–	2021-12-31
Designation		From		To
A 9		2000-07-01	–	2021-12-31
Location		From		To
Kristinehamn Garrison		2000-07-01	–	2005-12-31
Boden Garrison		2005-09-01	–	2021-12-31

== See also ==
- List of Swedish artillery regiments
