= Karlsborg Fortress =

Military base in Karlsborg, Västergötland, Sweden

- Karlsborgs fästning
- Karlsborg in Sweden
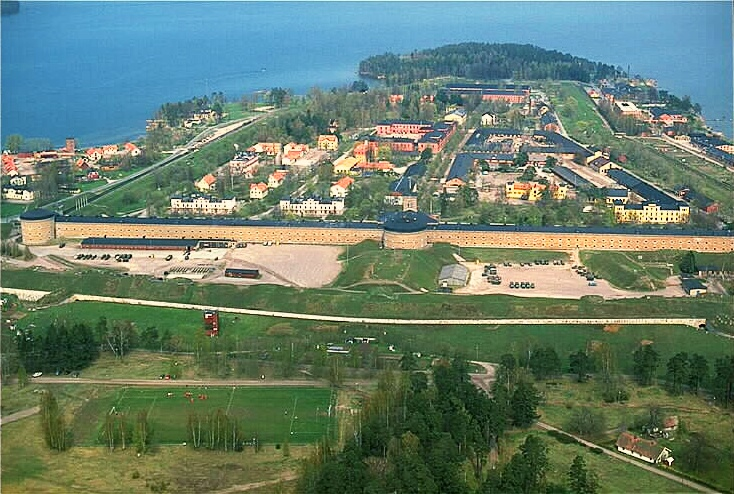
- Aerial photo of the Fortress (picture taken from the west).

Site information
- Type: Fortification

Location
- Coordinates: 58°31′55″N 14°31′50″E

Site history
- Built: 1819–1909
- In use: Active as a fortress 1831–1925; Training Garrison 1925–
- Materials: Limestone, gravel

Garrison information
- Past commanders: Oskar Sylvander (1904–1919); Christofer Lemchen (1911–1918); William Bergman (1919–1927)

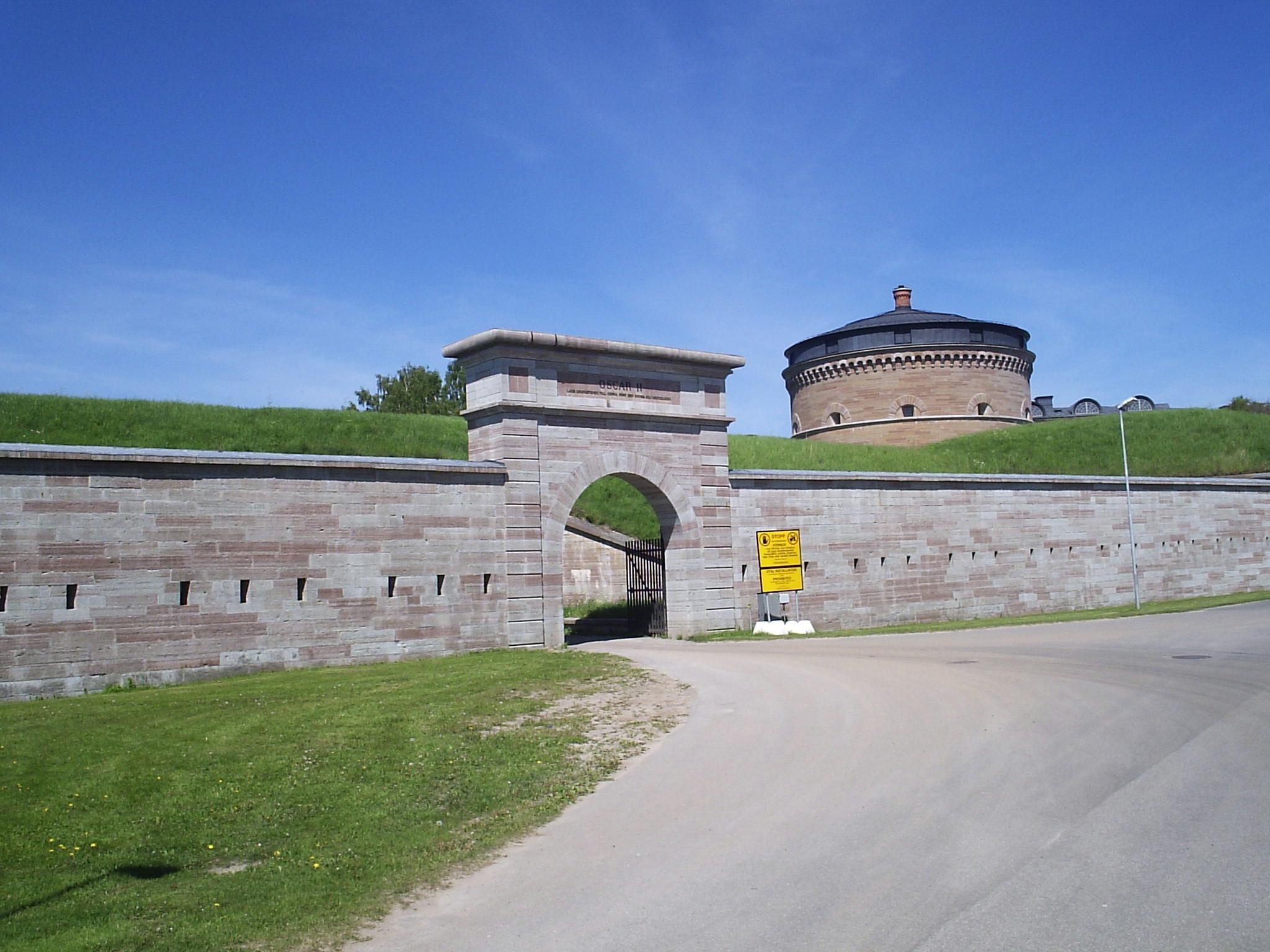
Karlsborg Fortress.

Karlsborg Fortress (Swedish: Karlsborgs fästning) is situated on the Vanäs peninsula in Karlsborg by lake Vättern, the province of Västergötland, Sweden. Construction on the fortress began 1819 to realize the so-called central defense idea adopted by the Swedish military after the Finnish and Napoleonic Wars. The site was chosen by Baltzar von Platen in connection with the construction of the Göta Canal.

The intent of the central defense idea was that the King, the Council, the Riksdag and central command functions would, in the event of an attack against the kingdom, pull back and ensconce themselves in this fortress in the middle of the country. Even the gold reserves of the central bank of Sweden were to be safeguarded in the fortress in times of trouble. The fortress is one of northern Europe's largest buildings and consists primarily of limestone from Omberg.

== History ==
Construction was begun in 1819 on 100 hectares (250 acres) of land. The fortress was to house a garrison of 6,000 enlisted men and an additional 8,000-10,000 people. The walls were mostly complete in 1830. After comprehensive visits to other fortresses in Europe, fortress architect Johan av Klen presented plans similar in style to Fort Winiary in Posen (present-day Poznań).

Due to its great expense and reduced funding, the fortress wasn't in operation until 1870, and wasn't fully completed until 1909. To compensate for the rapidly evolving technology of artillery during this time, Vaberget Fortress was built in the early 1900s five kilometers west of Karlsborg to provide additional protection to the main fortress.

The town of Karlsborg has sprung up next to the fortress. It was initially mostly living quarters for personnel employed at the fortress, but grew to a sizable community, in part due to Göta Canal which passes through the town.

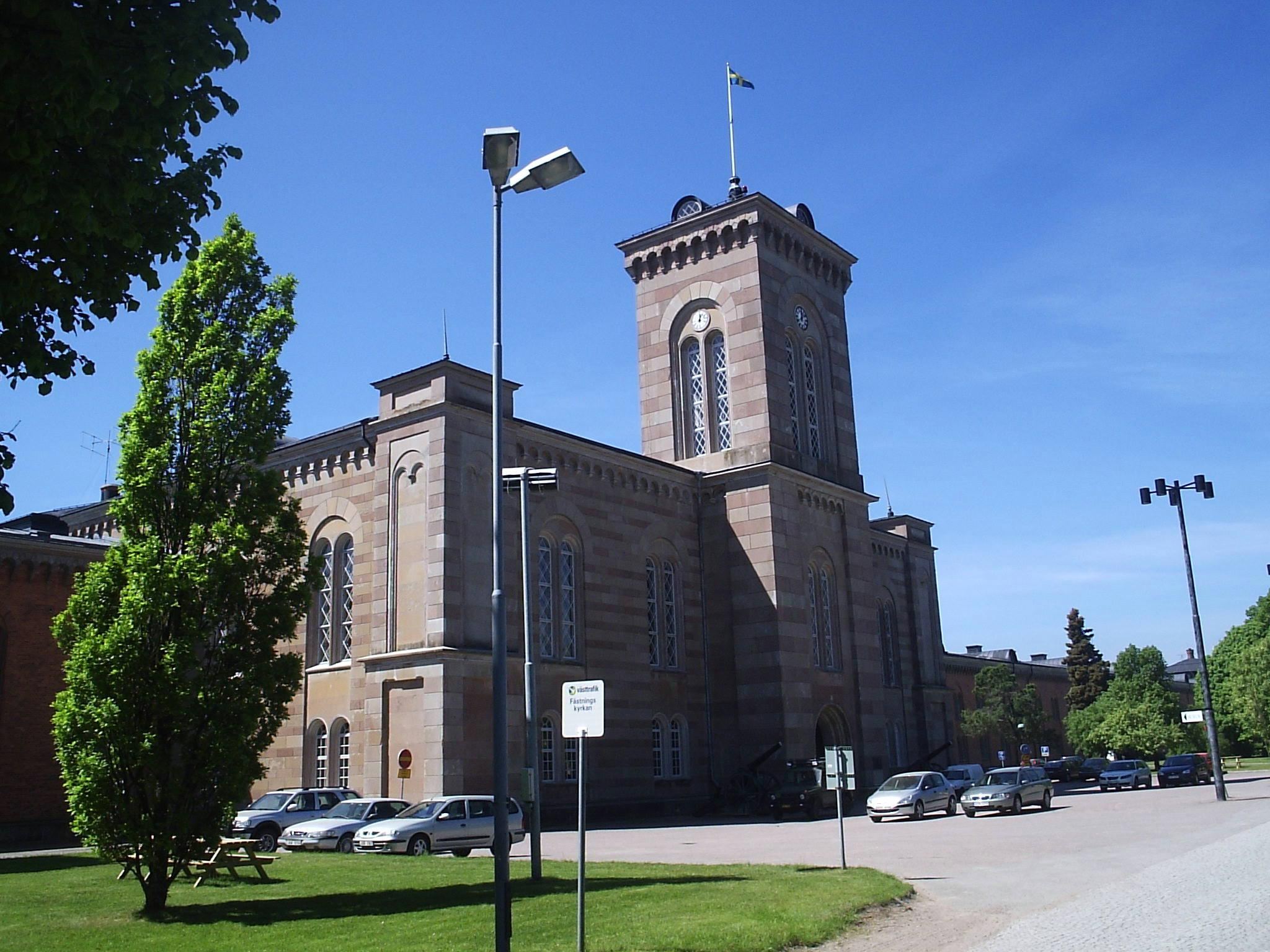
The garrison church.

Ever since the fortress lost its intended central defensive role in 1918 it has been used as a garrison for Göta Signal Regiment (S 2), and since 1984 Life Regiment Hussars (K 3) are also based there. The Swedish Parachute Ranger School and the Swedish Operations Group are also housed in the fortress. Next to the fortress is a munitions factory.

Karlsborg has been a Swedish listed building in Sweden (byggnadsminne) since 1935. The garrison church is especially worth visiting. The church is housed in the central building of the fortress, "the last stand", on the second floor above the Fortress Museum. The church was once intended as an assembly hall for the Riksdag in times of troubles. A chandelier composed of 276 bayonets instead of crystal prisms hangs from the ceiling.
