= Artillery Regiment (1636) =

- Artilleriregementet
- Active: 1636–1794
- Country: Sweden
- Branch: Swedish Army
- Type: Artillery
- Size: Regiment

The Artillery Regiment (Swedish: Artilleriregementet) was a Swedish Army artillery regiment that traced its origins back to the 17th century. It split into four artillery regiments in 1794. The regiment's soldiers were recruited from the whole country, and it was garrisoned at several locations.

== History ==
The regiment has its origins in an artillery company raised in Stockholm in 1623. The regiment Fältartilleriregementet was then organised in 1630 to follow Gustav II Adolf in the Thirty Years' War, and in 1636, all Swedish artillery was brought together under one commander. From 1689, Artilleriregementet was organised in peacetime, with field artillery in Stockholm, Jönköping and Malmö, and fortress artillery on over 30 locations in the Swedish Empire.

During the Great Northern War the artillery had been greatly diminished and was completely reorganised in 1718 into one field establishment and twelve fortress establishments located in Stockholm, Jönköping, Malmö, Halmstad, Varberg, Gothenburg, Kalmar, Kristianstad, Landskrona, Marstrand, Bohus and Sundsborg. The regiment had 3,200 men organised into 40 companies in 1792. Two years later in 1794, it was reorganised into four new regiments, Svea Artillery Regiment, Göta Artillery Regiment, Wendes Artillery Regiment and Finnish Artillery Regiment.

== Campaigns ==
- The Thirty Years' War (1630–1648)
- The Torstenson War (1643–1645)
- The Northern Wars (1655–1661)
- The Scanian War (1674–1679)
- The Great Northern War (1700–1721)
- The Hats' Russian War (1741–1743)
- The Seven Years' War (1757–1762)
- The Gustav III's Russian War (1788–1790)

== Name, designation and garrison ==
Name	Translation	From		To
Fältartilleriregementet	Field Artillery Regiment	1630	–	1689
Artilleriregementet	Artillery Regiment	1689	–	1794-06-22

Designation	From		To
No designation		–	

Training ground or garrison town	From		To
Various, mainly Stockholm (G)	1636	–	1794-06-22

== See also ==
- List of Swedish regiments
- Provinces of Sweden
