= Småland Artillery Regiment =

Swedish Army military unit (1895–1985)

- Smålands artilleriregemente
- Active: 1895–1985
- Country: Sweden
- Branch: Swedish Army
- Garrison/HQ: Jönköping garrison, Jönköping
- Patron: Saint Barbara
- March: "Smålands artilleriregementes marsch" (Rune) (Note: The march was established in 1953 by Army Order 33/1953. It was used by the Swedish Army Artillery Center (Arméns artillericentrum, ArtC) from 1993 to 1997, and by the Artillery Combat School (Artilleriets stridsskola, ArtSS) from 1998 to 2000.)
- Anniversaries: 4 December (Note: 4 December is saint day of Saint Barbara.)

Insignia
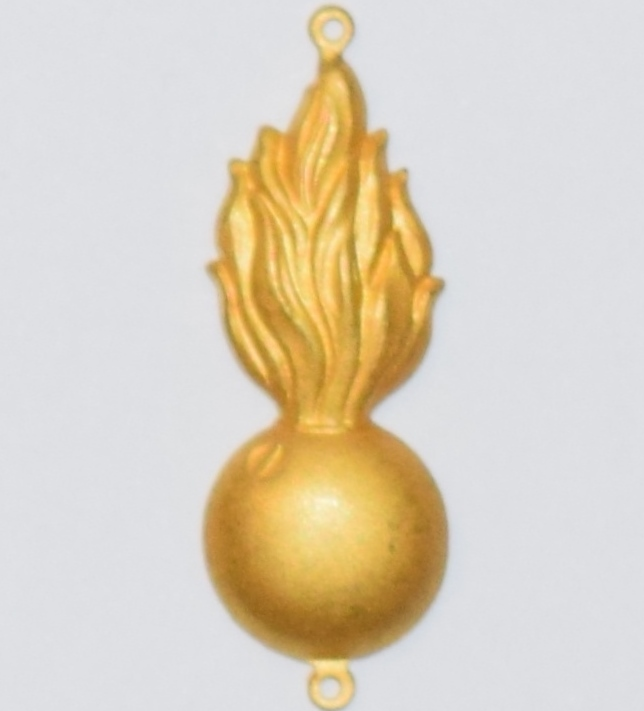
- Branch insignia

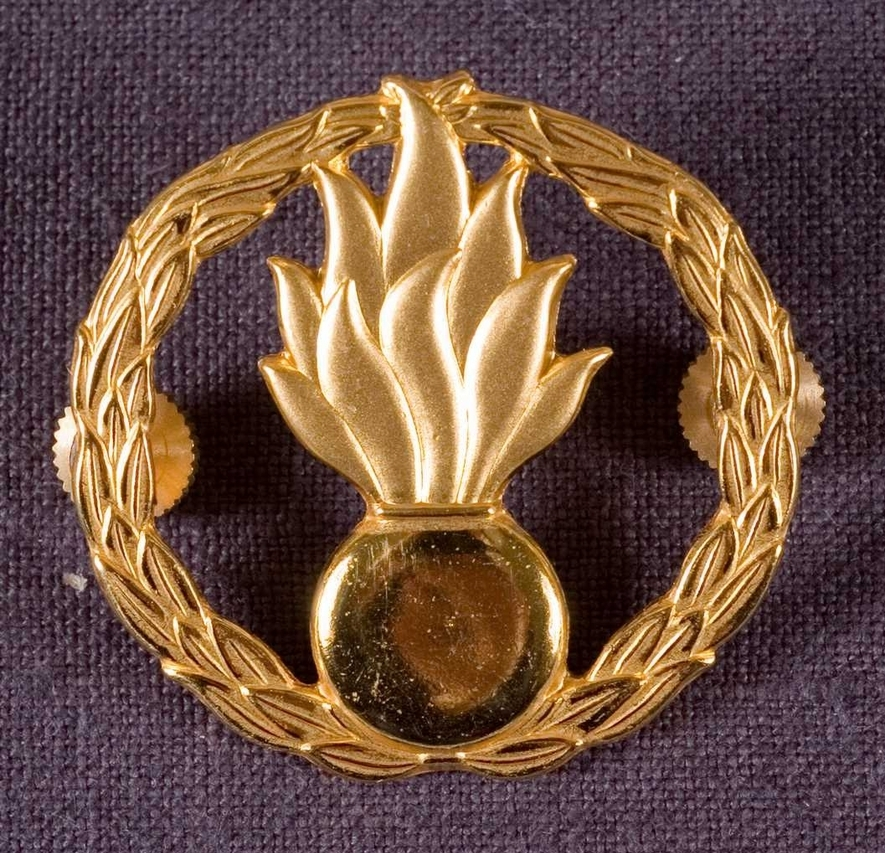
- Cap badge

The Småland Artillery Regiment (Swedish: Smålands artilleriregemente) was a Swedish Army artillery regiment located in the county of Jönköping, active from 1895 to 1985. The regiment was located at Jönköping garrison by itself.

== Locations and training areas ==
=== Barracks ===
On 1 October 1895, the regiment was officially formed and relocated to Gothenburg. However, an orderly room had already been organized on 25 April 1894 in Stockholm, which was then located at Svea Artillery Regiment's barracks on Valhallavägen. In Gothenburg, the regiment was stationed in the First Göta Artillery Regiment's former barracks at Kaserntorget 11 in Otterhällan (after 1904 known as Kungshöjd). On 6 April 1898, the regiment officially moved into the newly built barracks area on Kompanigatan 6 in Jönköping. However, the move to Jönköping had been going on since 4 February 1898. During 1905, certain extensions were made, and in 1942, two new barracks were built. In 1928, the regiment also took over the training area that had been managed and belonged to Jönköping Regiment.

After the regiment was disbanded, Jönköping Municipality bought 365 hectares out of a total of 370 hectares for SEK 12 million. Commercial City Center AB then bought 25 hectares of the land, the part with, among other things, the barracks buildings. In April 1987, the regimental area was transformed into the A6 Center, which consists of a shopping center and office space in the former barracks.

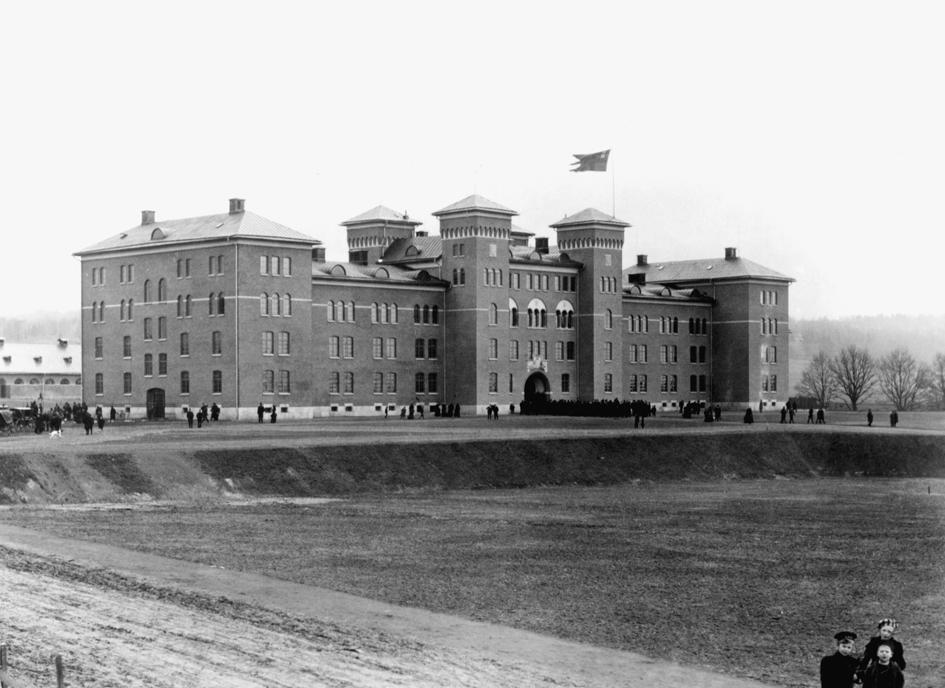
Barracks in 1898

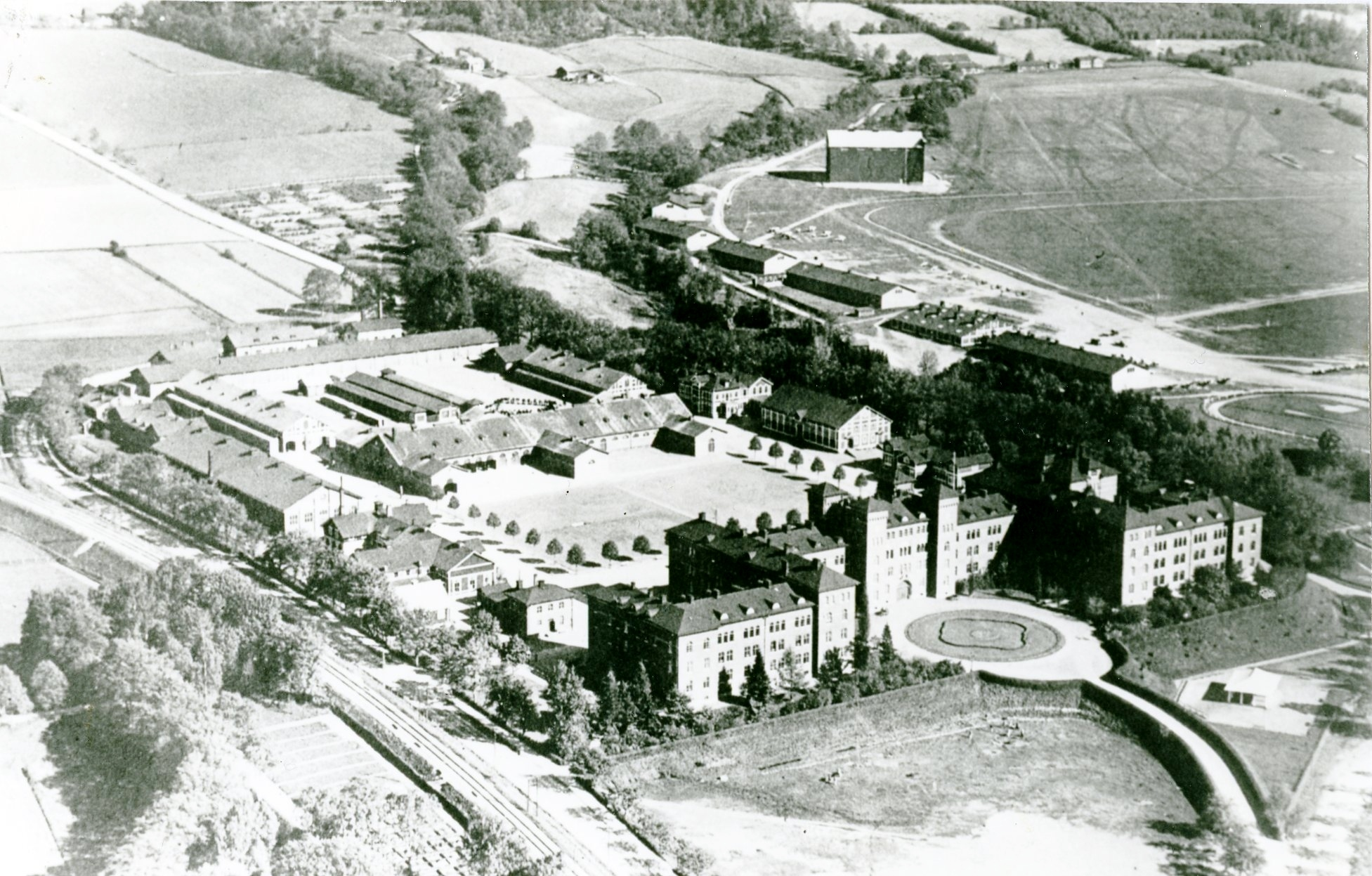
1930 aerial view

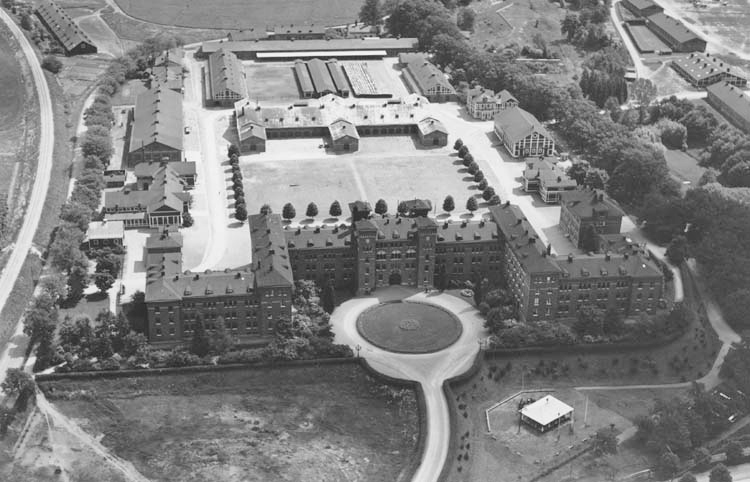
1936 aerial view

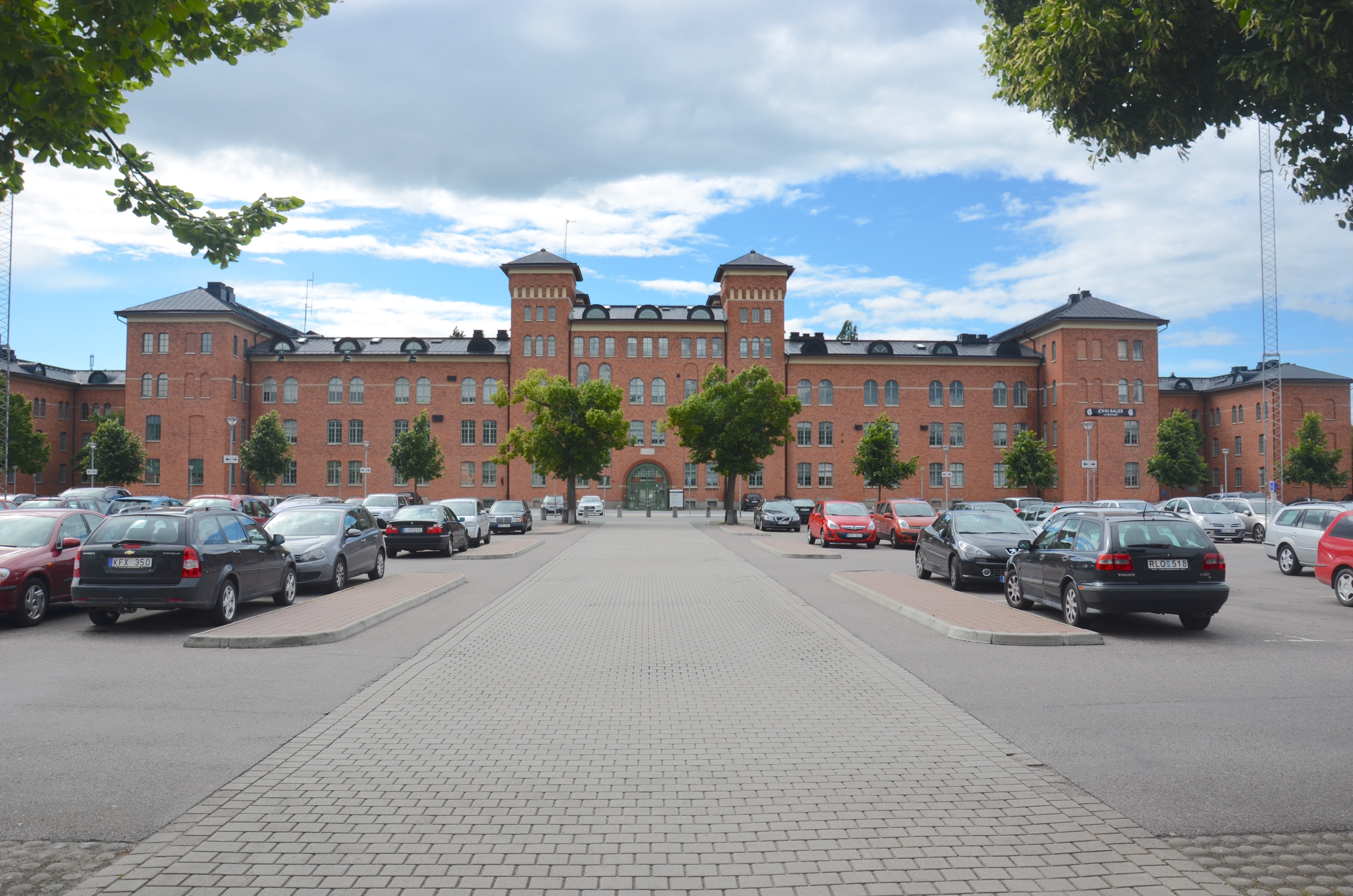
Barracks in 2012

=== Training areas ===
The regiment had its training area from 1896 on Tånga Hed and from 6 June 1898 in Skillingaryd training area. The regiment also had exercise activities at Kronheden and Barnarp in Jönköping during the years 1940–1945. On 1 July 1985, the management of Skillingaryd training area was transferred to Småland Regiment (I 12/Fo 17).

== Heraldry and traditions ==
=== Coat of arms ===
The coat of arms of Småland Artillery Regiment (A 6) from 1977 to 1985. Blazon: "Or, the provincial badge of Småland, a double-tailed lion rampant gules, armed and langued azure, in the forepaws a crossbow gules, arrowhead argent, bow and string sable. The shield surmounted two gunbarrels of older pattern in saltire or. The gunbarrels may be sable."

=== Colours, standards and guidons ===
A standard was presented to the regiment by His Majesty the King Gustaf V on his birthday on 16 June 1938. The heritage of the regiment was passed on by Northern Småland Regiment (I 12) after the disbandment. From 1 July 2000, the traditions of the Småland Artillery Regiment are kept by the Artillery Regiment (A 9).

== Commanders ==
The commanders of the regiment throughout its history are as follows:

- 1895–1898: Gottschalk Geijer
- 1898–1899: A I R de Laval
- 1899–1902: Otto Virgin
- 1902–1902: C V G Grönvall (acting)
- 1902–1908: Axel Olof Staël von Holstein
- 1908–1915: David Hedengren
- 1915–1922: Ludvig Hammarskiöld
- 1922–1927: Bo Tarras-Wahlberg
- 1928–1931: Georg Sylvan
- 1931–1932: Per Sylvan
- 1932–1937: Hjalmar Thorén
- 1937–1942: Johan Gustaf Henning Schmiterlöw
- 1942–1949: Raoul Årmann
- 1949–1949: Curt Kempff (acting)
- 1949–1951: Hilding Kring
- 1951–1957: Ivan Thorson
- 1957–1957: Nils-Ivar Carlborg (acting)
- 1957–1964: Walter Lundqvist
- 1964–1970: Sten-Olle Tegmo
- 1970–1973: Claes Carlsten
- 1973–1976: Gösta Gärdin
- 1976–1976: Åke Hessler (acting)
- 1976–1980: Sten Geijer
- 1980–1982: Fredrik Lilliecreutz
- 1982–1985: Lars Carlson

== Attributes ==
Name	Translation	From		To
Kungliga Andra Göta artilleriregemente	Royal Second Göta Artillery Regiment	1894-10-01	–	1905-02-01
Kungliga Smålands artilleriregemente	Royal Småland Artillery Regiment	1905-02-02	–	1927-12-31
Kungliga Smålands arméartilleriregemente	Royal Småland Army Artillery Regiment	1928-01-01	–	1942-09-30
Kungliga Smålands artilleriregemente	Royal Småland Artillery Regiment	1942-10-01	–	1974-12-31
Smålands artilleriregemente	Småland Artillery Regiment	1975-01-01	–	1985-06-30
Designation		From		To
№ 6		1894-10-01	–	1914-09-30
A 6		1914-10-01	–	1985-06-30
Location		From		To
Stockholm garrison		1894-04-25	–	1895-09-30
Gothenburg garrison		1895-10-01	–	1898-04-05
Jönköping garrison		1898-04-06	–	1985-06-30
