= Karlsborg =

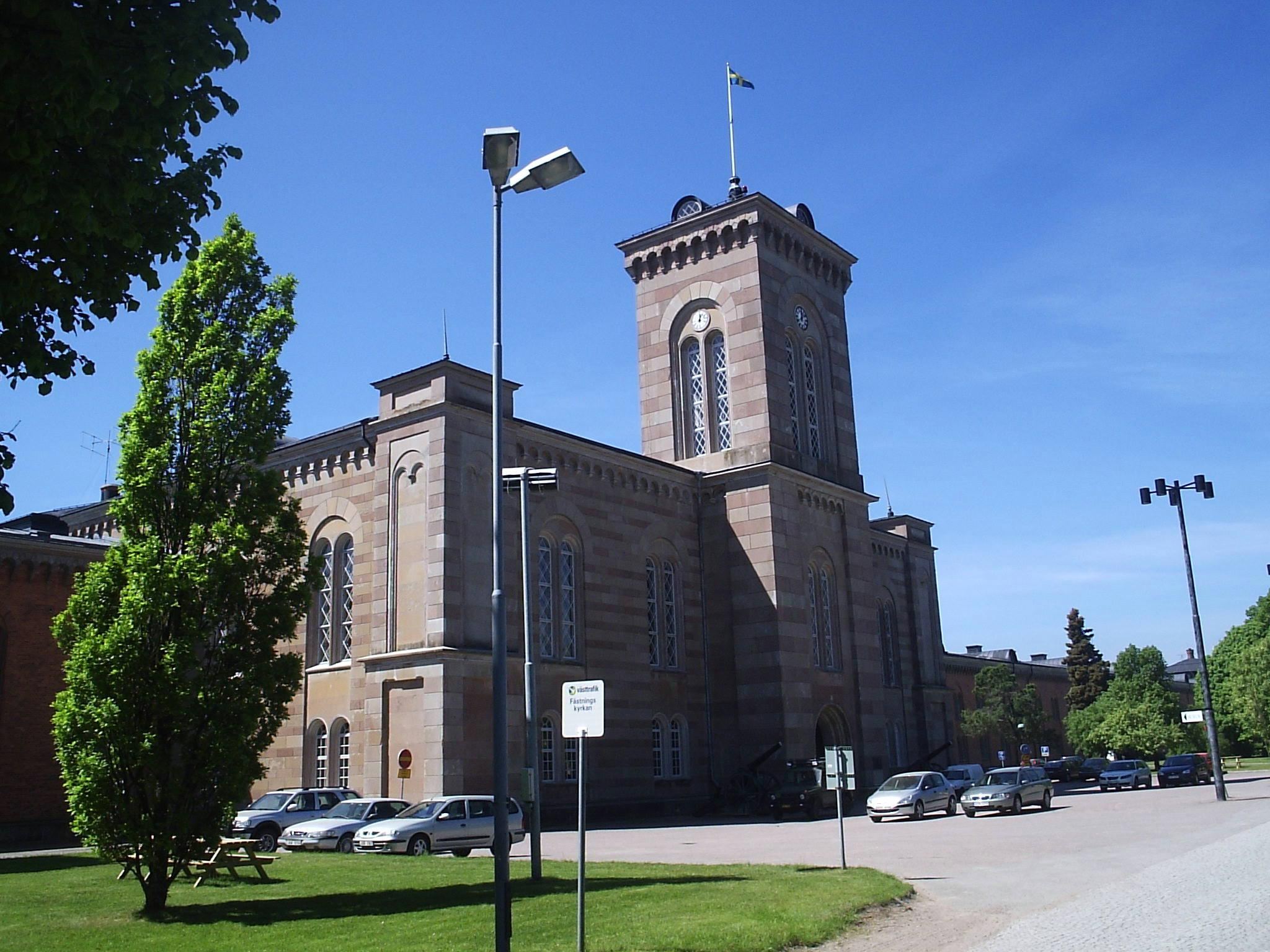
- The garrison church in Karlsborg (9 June 2006)

- Location within Västra Götaland Location within Sweden
- Coordinates: 58°32′0″N 14°30′30″E
- Country: Sweden
- Province: Västergötland
- County: Västra Götaland County
- Municipality: Karlsborg Municipality

Area
  - Total: 5.40 km^{2} (2.08 sq mi)

Population (31 December 2010)
  - Total: 3,551
  - Density: 657/km^{2} (1,700/sq mi)
- Time zone: UTC+1 (CET)
  - Summer (DST): UTC+2 (CEST)

Karlsborg (Swedish: [kaɭsˈbɔrj], outdatedly [ˈkɑ̂ːɭsbɔrj]) is a locality and the seat of Karlsborg Municipality, Västra Götaland County, Sweden. It had 3,551 inhabitants in 2010. This garrison town lies at the shore of lake Vättern in Västergötland.

== History ==
The town of Karlsborg was established and grew due to the construction of Karlsborg Fortress, during the 19th century. According to the principles of a central defense, the fortress was designated as the reserve capital of Sweden in the event of war.
