= List of Swedish armoured regiments =

This is a list of Swedish armoured regiments, battalions, corps and companies that have existed in the Swedish Army. They are listed in three ways, first by the actual units that have existed, then by the various names these units have had, and last by the various designations these units have had.

== By unit ==
- P 1 Göta pansarlivgarde (1943–1963)
- P 1 Göta livgarde (1963–1980)
- P 2 Skånska pansarregementet (1942–1963)
- P 2 Norra skånska dragonregementet (1994–1998)
- P 2 Skånska dragonregementet (1963–1994 and 1998–2000)
- P 3 Södermanlands pansarregemente (1942–1957)
- P 4 Skaraborgs pansarregemente (1942–1963)
- P 4 Skaraborgs regemente (1963– )
- P 5 Norrbottens pansarbataljon (1957–1975)
- I 19/P 5 Norrbottens regemente med Norrbottens pansarbataljon (1975–1994)
- I 19 Norrbottens regemente (1994– )
- P 6 Norra skånska regementet (1963–1994)
- P 7 Södra skånska regementet (1963– )
- P 10 Södermanlands regemente (1963–2005)
- P 18 Gotlands regemente (1963–2005 and 2018–)

== By name ==
- Gotlands regemente
- Göta livgarde
- Göta pansarlivgarde
- Norra skånska regementet
- Norrbottens pansarbataljon
- Norrbottens regemente
- Norrbottens regemente och Norrbottensbrigaden
- Norrbottens regemente med Norrbottens pansarbataljon
- Skaraborgs pansarregemente
- Skaraborgs regemente
- Skaraborgs regemente och Skaraborgsbrigaden
- Skånska dragonregementet
- Skånska pansarregementet
- Södermanlands pansarregemente
- Södermanlands regemente
- Södra skånska regementet

== By designation ==
- I 19
- I 19/P 5
- MekB 9
- MekB 19
- P 1
- P 2
- P 2/Fo 14
- P 3
- P 4
- P 4/Fo 35
- P 5
- P 6
- P 6/Fo 14
- P 7
- P 7/Fo 11
- P 10
- P 10/Fo 43
- P 18
- Pbat/I 19

== See also ==
- List of Swedish regiments
- Military district (Sweden)
- List of Swedish defence districts
