= Boden Artillery Regiment =

Swedish Army artillery unit

Coordinates: 65.80485°N 21.67651°E

- Bodens artilleriregemente
- Active: 1919–2004, 2022–present
- Country: Sweden
- Allegiance: Swedish Armed Forces
- Branch: Swedish Army
- Type: Artillery
- Size: Battalion
- Part of: List: VI Army Division (1919–1927); Upper Norrland Troops (1928–1942); VI Military District (1942–1966); Upper Norrland Military District (1966–1993); Northern Military District (1993–2000); Norrbotten Regiment (2000–2004)
- Garrison/HQ: Boden Garrison
- Patron: Saint Barbara
- Colors: Yellow and black
- March: "Re e Patria" (Canzano) (Note: The march was inherited from Boden-Karlsborg Artillery Regiment and was established in 1953 by Army Order 33/1953.)
- Anniversaries: 4 December (Note: 4 December is saint day of Saint Barbara.)

Commanders
- Current commander: COL Jan Karlsson

Insignia
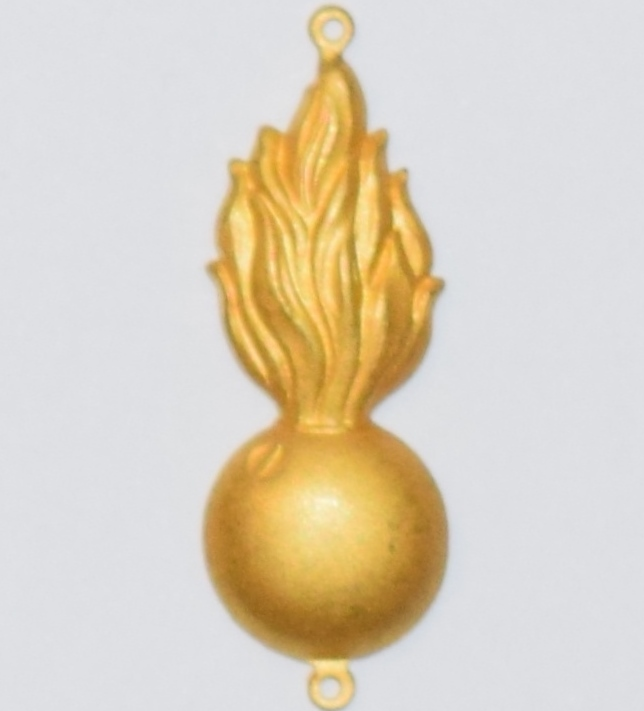
- Branch insignia

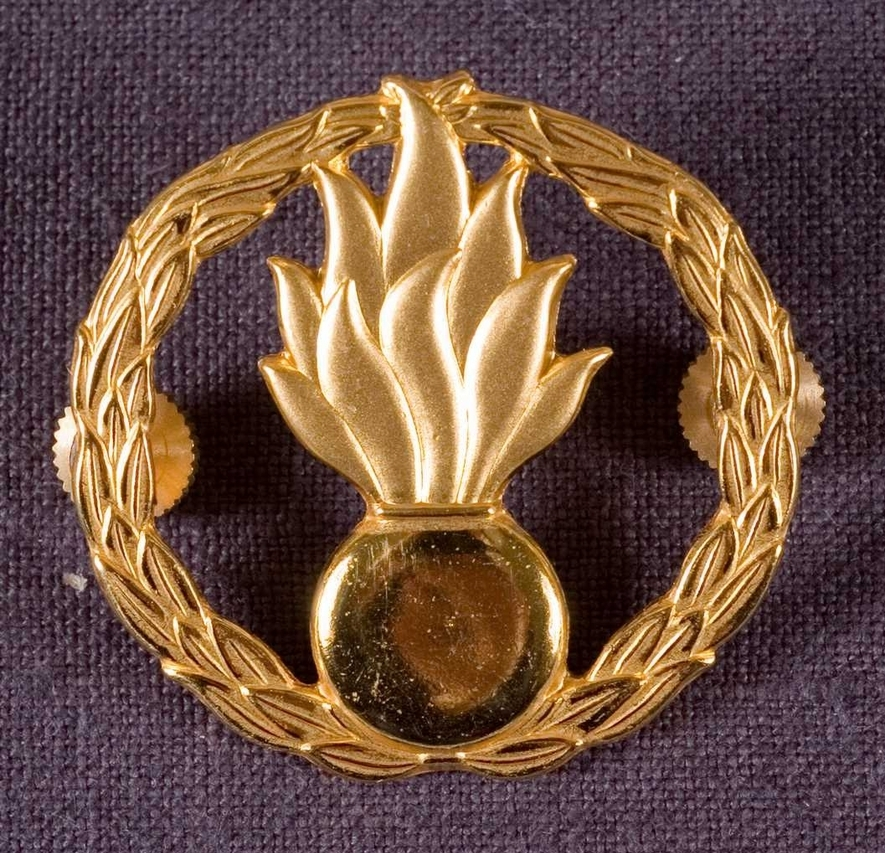
- Cap badge

Boden Artillery Regiment (Swedish: Bodens artilleriregemente, A 8) is an artillery unit within the Swedish Army that operated in various forms from 1919 to 2004 and again from 2022. It is based in Boden Garrison in Boden.

== History ==
The unit was raised on 10 September 1919, by a division of the Boden-Karlsborg Artillery Regiment (A 8), where the parts placed at Karlsborg formed Karlsborg Artillery Corps (A 10), and the parts placed at Boden Fortress formed Boden Artillery Regiment (A 8). On 1 July 1937, an air defense company was added to the regiment, which was later transferred to Luleå Anti-Aircraft Corps (Lv 7).

After World War II, the idea was that the Swedish defense would be disarmed. This was stated in the Defense Committee's report of 1945, which, prior to the Defence Act of 1948, suggested, among other things, that Norrbotten Artillery Corps (A 5) should be amalgamated with Boden Artillery Regiment (A 8). Instead of cooling off the security policy situation in Europe after the war, a new security policy was initiated through the Cold War. This prompted the Minister of Defence to advocate strengthening the defense instead. In December 1947, the Defense Committee's proposal fell and instead a reinforcement was decided. However, the Riksdag adopted the Defense Committee's proposal, which in practice meant that Norrbotten Artillery Corps was disbanded on 30 June 1951 and was amalgamated into the Boden Artillery Regiment. From 1 July 1951 the artillery division from Norrbotten Artillery Corps (A 5) was added. Initially, Boden Artillery Regiment was a fortress artillery regiment, but more and more developed into a movable artillery regiment. Among other things, through the artillery division that was supplied from Norrbotten Artillery Corps. In the 1960s, the regiment, as the only unit in Sweden, was supplied with 26 units of the Bandkanon 1 self-propelled artillery vehicle.

In connection with the OLLI reform, which was carried out within the Swedish Armed Forces between 1973 and 1975, the Boden Artillery Regiment (A 8) was amalgamated with Boden Defence District (Bodens försvarsområde, Fo 63) and formed on 1 July 1975 the försvarsområdesregemente ("defence district regiment") A 8/Fo 63. This resulted in the Boden Artillery Regiment becoming an A-unit (defence district regiment), and other units within the defence district becoming a B-unit (training unit). Within a defence district, the A units had overall mobilization and material responsibility. Unique to Boden Artillery Regiment was that together with Uppland Regiment (S 1/Fo 47) and the Life Guard Dragoons (K 1/Fo 44), it was a defence district regiment. Normally, regiments which raised brigades were defence district regiments.

On 1 July 1994, the defence district staff was separated from the regiment, and Boden Artillery Regiment then became a B-unit. The defence district staff, in turn, formed an independent unit under the name of Boden Defence District (Bodens försvarsområde, Fo 63). By the Defence Act of 1996, Norrland Artillery Regiment (A 4) was disbanded on 31 December 1997. In traditional terms, Boden Artillery Regiment (A 8) was amalgamated with the disbanded Norrland Artillery Regiment (A 4), which was manifested at a ceremony on 31 December 1997, and from 1 January 1998 the name of Norrland Artillery Regiment (A 8) was adopted. Furthermore, two A 4 artillery battalions were added.

By the Defence Act of 2000, the Swedish government considered that only four artillery battalions were needed in the future rapid reaction organisation (insatsorganisation). What was clearly ahead of the Defence Act was that Wendes Artillery Regiment (A 3) and Gotland Artillery Regiment (A 7) should be disbanded. Which regiment was to be retained in the future organization was between Norrland Artillery Regiment (A 8) and Bergslagen Artillery Regiment (A 9). What spoke for retaining A 8 was the direct proximity to training areas, as well as a possible garrison coordination and collaboration with primarily the Norrbotten Regiment and Norrbotten Brigade (MekB 19). What spurred a disbandment was great distances and limited opportunities to co-operate with most of the ground forces and schools for officer training. What spoke to keep A 9 in Kristinehamn was the proximity to Älvdalen training area and the possibility of co-operation with a large number of units in southern and central Sweden, but also that Kristinehamn already constituted a center of expertise for the artillery function through the Artillery Combat School (Artilleriets stridsskola, ArtSS) which was already located to Kristinehamn. The government thus chose to propose the liquidation of Norrland Artillery Regiment (A 8). But in the same proposal, the government considered it important to have winter artillery connections. Thus, an artillery battalion would be retained in Boden, and placed under the Norrbotten Regiment (I 19). On 30 June 2000, Norrland Artillery Regiment was disbanded as an independent unit. From 1 July 2000, the artillery battalion was organized as a training battalion in Norrbotten Regiment (I 19). The new battalion adopted the name Norrland Artillery Battalion (Artbat/I 19). The battalion consisted of a battalion staff, an artillery company and a staff company. According to the Defence Act, the activities of the artillery battalion should as far as possible be a reflection of the Artillery Regiment (A 9), though on a smaller scale. The new artillery battalion came to consist of twelve Haubits 77B vehicle-drawn howitzer. Bandkanon 1 was never adopted in the new organization, but began to be phased out and was completely discontinued in 2003.

The Defence Act of 2004 decided that the artillery regiment staff would be disbanded, and that the organization be reduced by three artillery battalions 77B, and that only one geographical location be retained for the training of artillery. In the organization, a Haubits 77B battalion would be maintained in low readiness, and that the Haubits 77BD battalion should be organized at the earliest in 2010. In the government's balancing of the artillery of the future, it was considered that Kristinehamn had limited operations in one locality. Kristinehamn thus had limited opportunities for co-operation with other functions within the Swedish Army. Regarding Boden, the government considered that the site had a more suitable infrastructure and general skills for artillery training. Furthermore, with Norrbotten Regiment (I 19), Boden was an integrated platform with training of several functions, and had a proximity to Norrbotten Wing (F 21) in Luleå. Furthermore, it was considered that locating the artillery to Boden would secure the service branch's subarctic capability. In this, the government proposed in its Bill 2004/05:5 that the Artillery Regiment should be relocated from Kristinehamn to Boden. Furthermore, the artillery battalion of the Norrbotten Regiment (I 19) was to be disbanded and incorporated into the Artillery Regiment. On 31 December 2004, the battalion was disbanded, and from 1 January 2005, the battalion transitioned to a Decommissioning Organization until the disbandment was completed by 30 June 2006. On 23 May 2005, a joint disbandment ceremony was conducted for the battalions in Boden affected by the Defence Act. The ceremony was held at the Norrbotten Regiment's barracks yard. On 20 December 2005, the artillery battalion marched symbolically into the new barracks area. From 1 January 2006, the artillery battalion became part of the Artillery Regiment (A 9) in Boden.

== Units ==
=== Current units ===
- Regiment Headquarters (Regementsstaben)
- 91st Artillery Battalion (91:a artilleribataljonen)
  - 910th Headquarters Company (910:e stabs- och trosskompaniet)
  - 911th Battery Company (911:e pjäskompaniet)
  - 912th Battery Company (912:e pjäskompaniet)
  - 913th Battery Company (913:e pjäskompaniet)
  - 914th Sensor Company (914:e sensorkompaniet)
- 92nd Artillery Battalion (92:a artilleribataljonen)
  - 920th Headquarters Company (920:e stabs- och trosskompaniet)
  - 921st Battery Company (921:a pjäskompaniet)
  - 922nd Battery Company (922:a pjäskompaniet)
  - 923rd Battery Company (923:e pjäskompaniet)
  - 924th Sensor Company (924:e sensorkompaniet)

== Location and training areas ==
When the unit was raised in 1909 as Boden Artillery Battalion, it was located to a newly erected barracks area along the Åbergsleden. In 1940 another barracks were erected in this area. The unit remained on Åbergsleden until 2005. However, the battalion staff was co-located with Norrbotten Regiment in the years 2000–2005. On 20 December 2005, the Norrland Artillery Battalion marched symbolically into its new barracks area on Sveavägen. This was in connection with the battalion being amalgamated into the Artillery Regiment, which had been relocated from Kristinehamn to Sveavägen in Boden from 31 December 2005. The former barracks area on Åbergsleden houses, among other things, since June 2006 the Boden Defense Museum (Försvarsmuseum Boden).

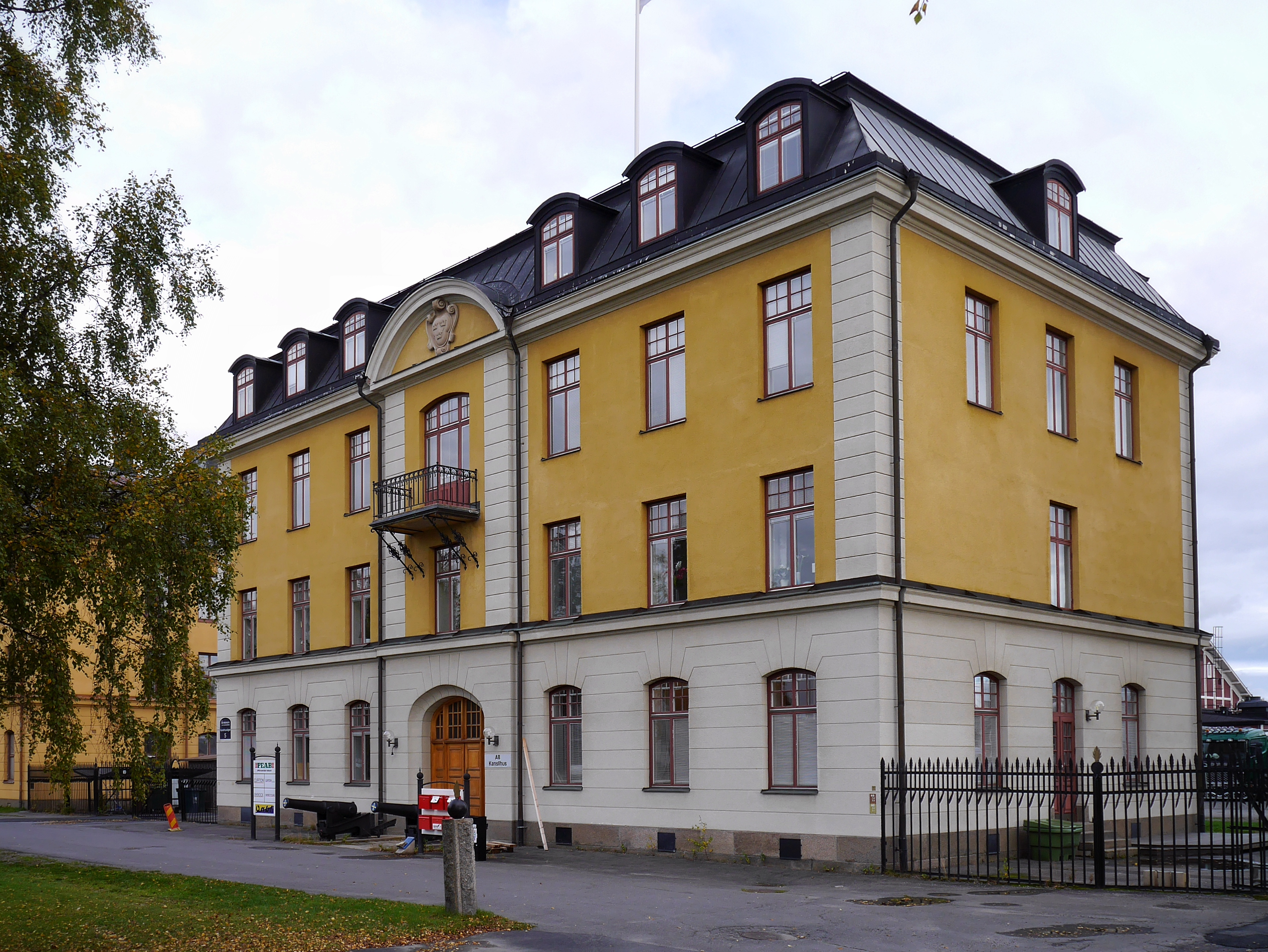
Chancellery building

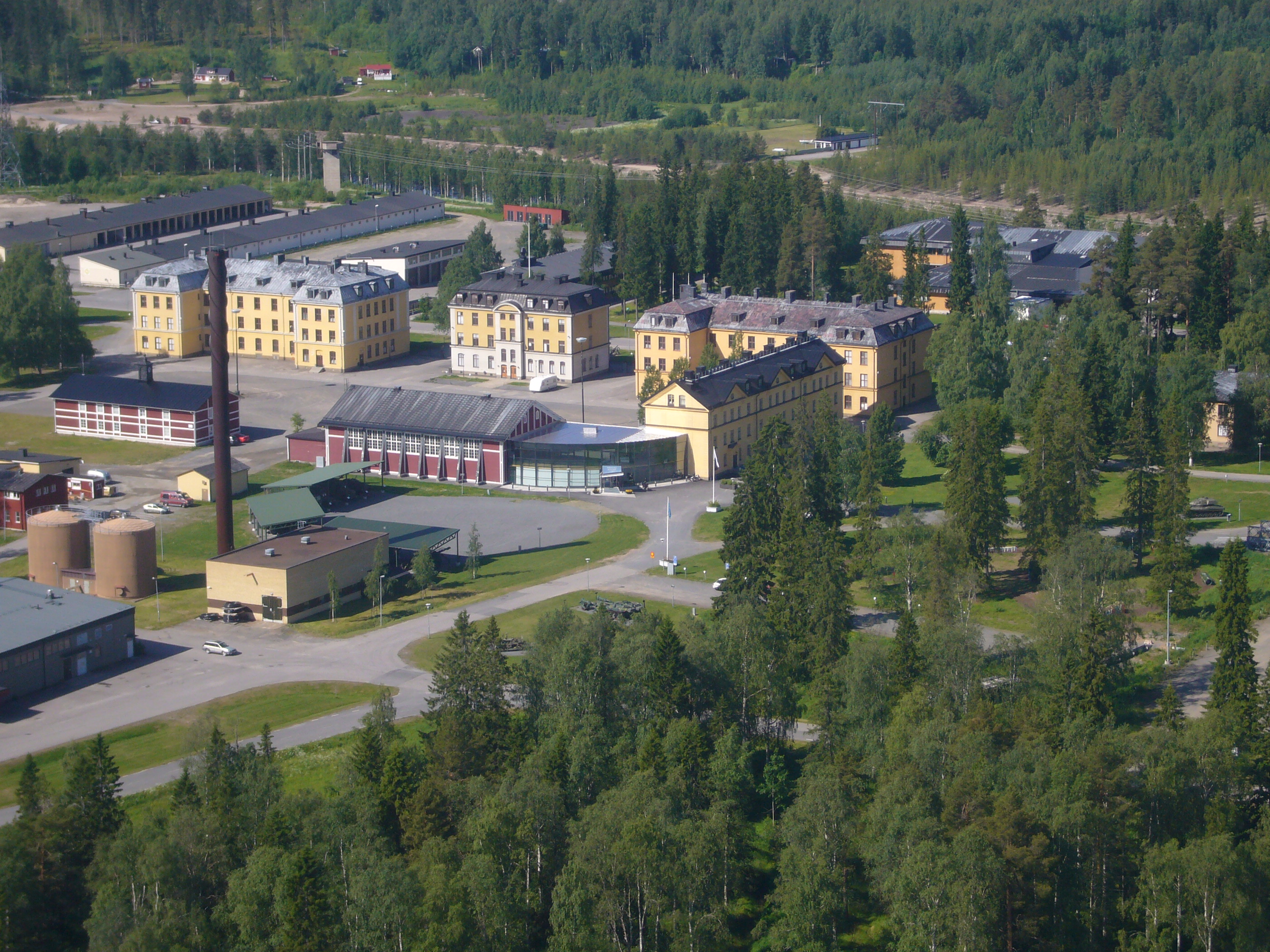
Aerial view of the barracks area

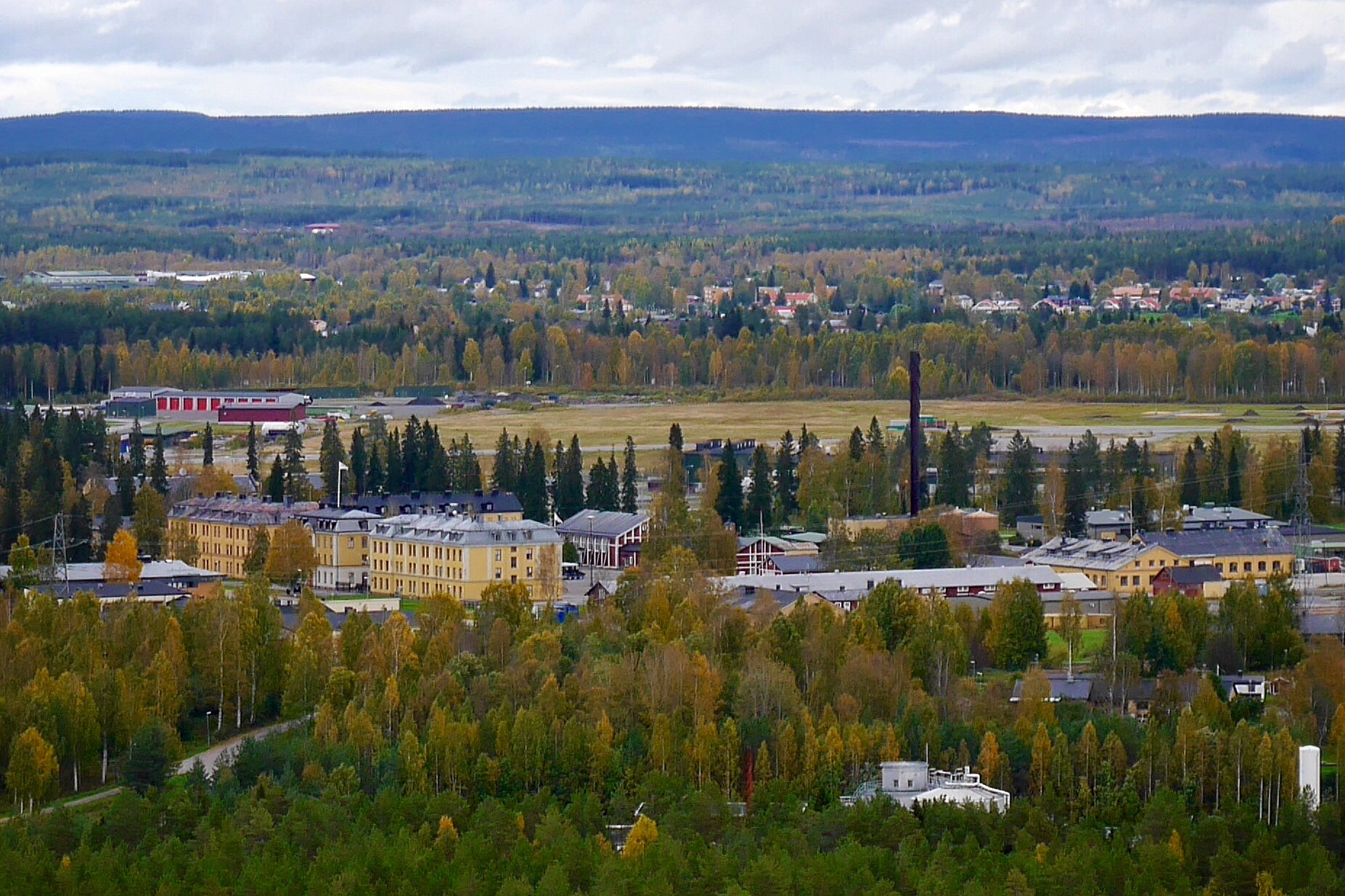
Aerial view of the barracks area

== Heraldry and traditions ==
=== Colours, standards and guidons ===
A colour was presented to the unit by His Majesty the King Gustaf V on 16 June 1938. On 28 April 1951, the regiment took over the standard of Norrbotten Artillery Corps (A 5). From 1 January 1998, the regiment also carried on the name and standard of Norrland Artillery Regiment (A 4). From 1 July 2000 the standard was passed on to Norrland Artillery Battalion. In conjunction with Norrland Artillery Battalion amalgamated with the Artillery Regiment (A 9), the Artillery Regiment came to take over the traditions of the Norrland Artillery Regiment (A 4) and the Boden Artillery Regiment (A 8).

A new colour was presented to the unit in Kristinehamn by His Majesty the King Carl XVI Gustaf on 15 April 2002. It was drawn by Kristina Holmgård-Åkerberg and embroidered by machine in insertion technique by Sofie Thorburn. Blazon: "On blue cloth in the centre the lesser coat of arms of Sweden, three yellow crowns placed two and one. In the first corner the town badge of Boden; a white wall with a gate tower embattled (the original name of the battalion was Boden Artillery Regiment, A 8), in the second corner two crossed yellow gunbarrels of older pattern, in the third corner the provincial badge of Västerbotten, a white reindeer at speed, armed red (a legacy from the former Norrbotten Artillery Corps, A 5) and in the fourth corner the provincial badge of Jämtland, a white elk passant, attacked on its back by a rising falcon and in the front by a rampant dog, both yellow; all animals armed red (a legacy from the former Norrland Artillery Regiment, A 4).

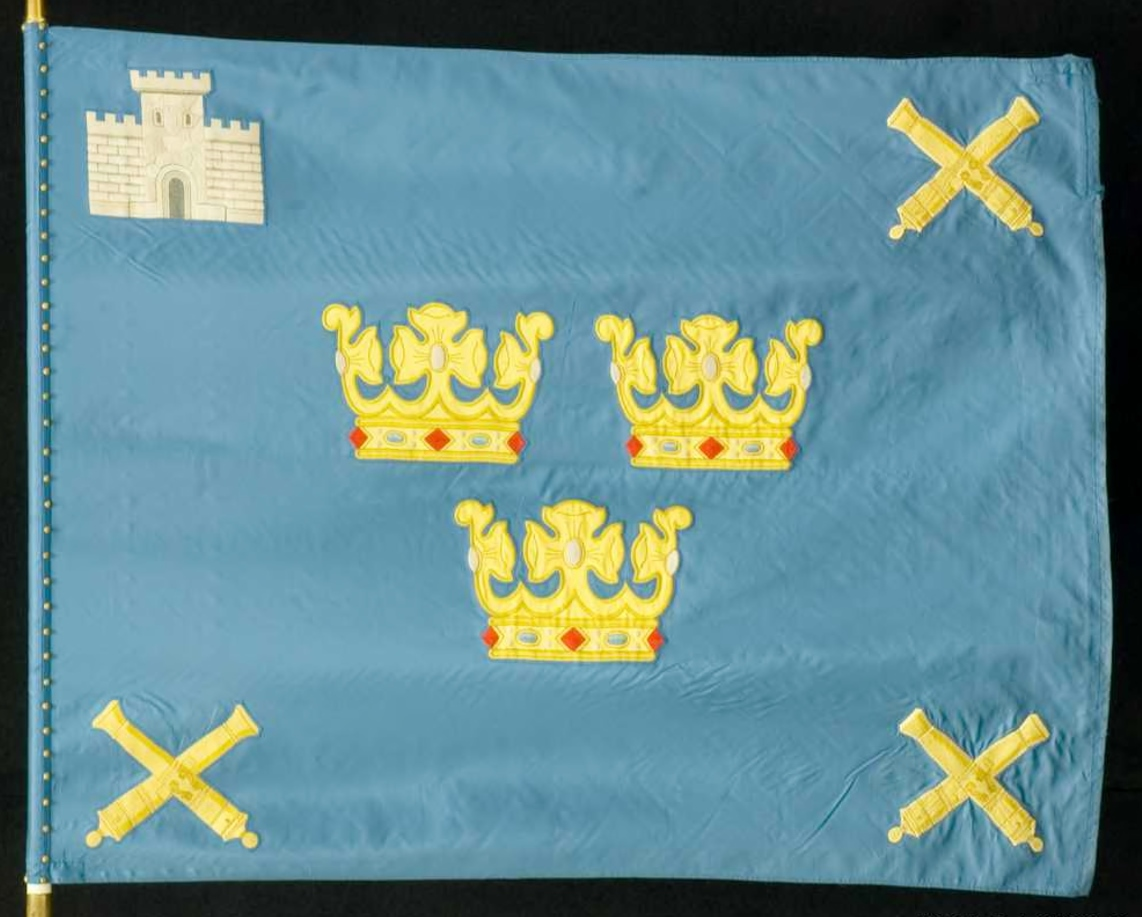
1938 colour

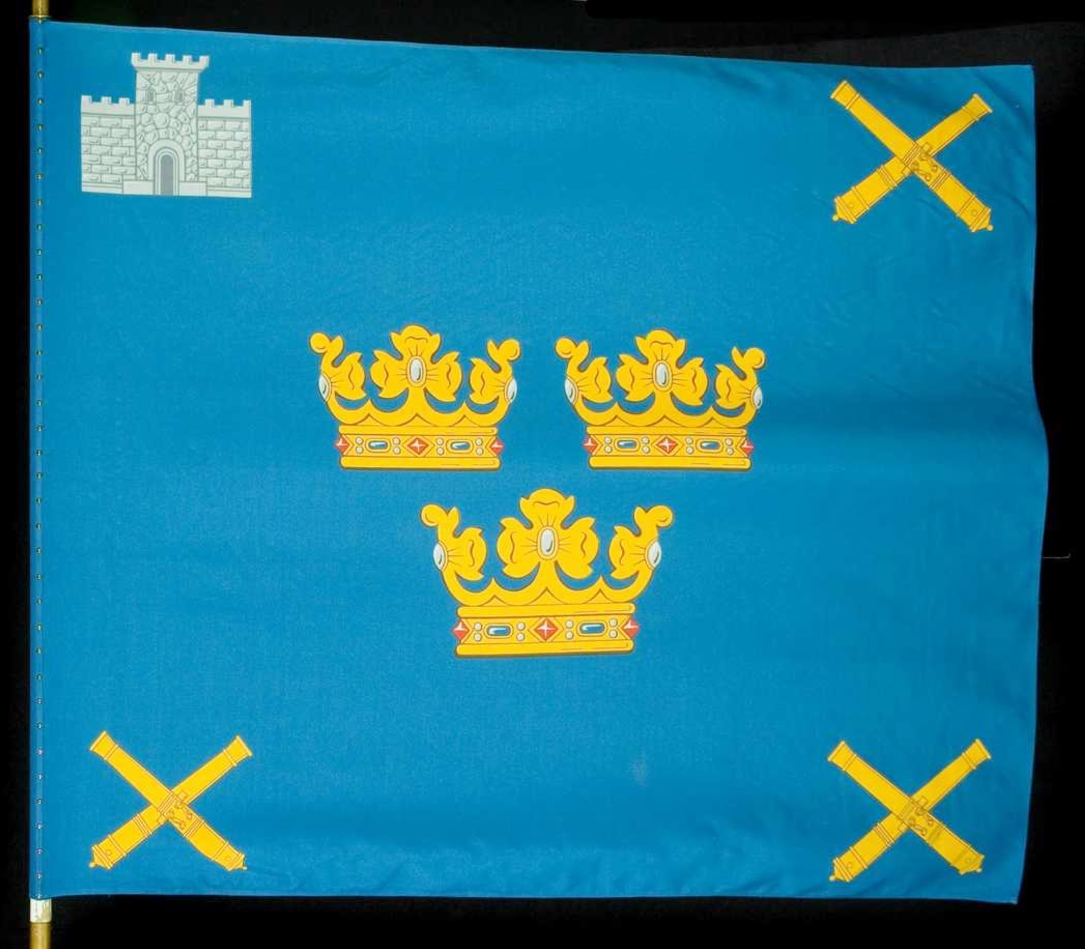
1975 colour

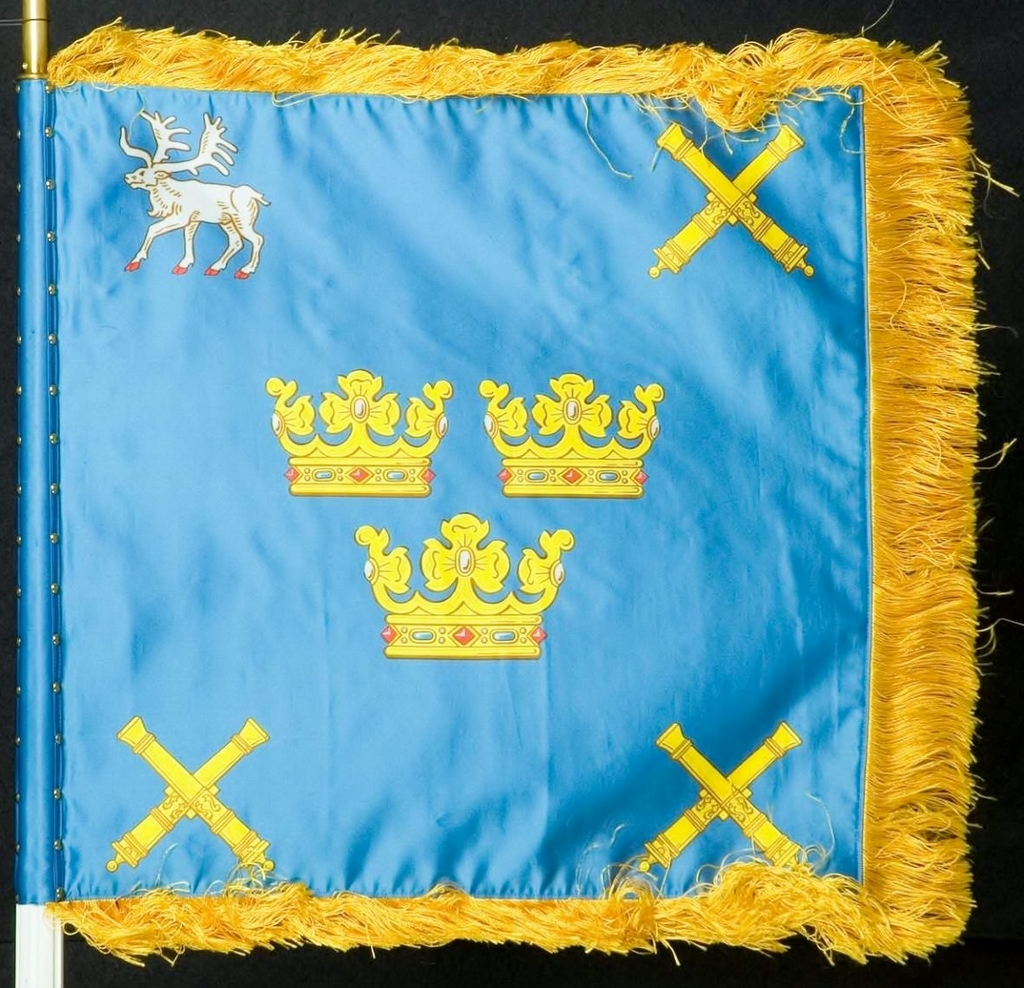
Standard of Norrbotten Artillery Corps

=== Coat of arms ===
The coat of the arms was used by Boden Artillery Regiment (A 8) from 1977 to 1997, the Norrland Artillery Regiment (A 8) from 1997 to 2000 and by the Norrland Artillery Battalion from 2000 to 2004. Blazon: "Argent, the town badge of Boden, a wall throughout embattled gules with a gatetower, mansoned in the first colour. The shield surmounted two gunbarrels of older pattern in saltire or. The gunbarrels may be sable."

=== Medals ===
In 1989, the Bodens artilleriregementes hedersmedalj ("Boden Artillery Regiment Honorary Medal") in gold (BodensartregGM) of the 9th size was established. The medal ribbon is of yellow moiré with narrow orange edges and a broad red stripe on each side followed on the inner side by a blue line. In 1994, the medal was renamed Norrlands artilleriregementes hedersmedalj ("Norrland Artillery Regiment Honorary Medal") (NorrlartregGM) and in 2000 it was renamed Norrlands artilleribataljons hedersmedalj ("Norrland Artillery Battalion Honorary Medal") (NorrlartbatGM).

In 2000, the Norrlands artilleriregementes (A 8) minnesmedalj ("Norrland Artillery Regiment (A 8) Commemorate Medal") in silver (NorrlartregSMM) of the 8th size was established. The medal ribbon is of yellow moiré with narrow orange edges and a broad red stripe on each side followed by a blue line.

In 2005, the Norrlands artilleribataljons minnesmedalj ("Norrland Artillery Battalion Commemorate Medal") in silver (NorrlartbatMSM) of the 8th size was established. The medal ribbon is of blue moiré with broad yellow edges followed first by a narrow red stripe and the by a white line. A running reindeer in silver is attached to the ribbon.

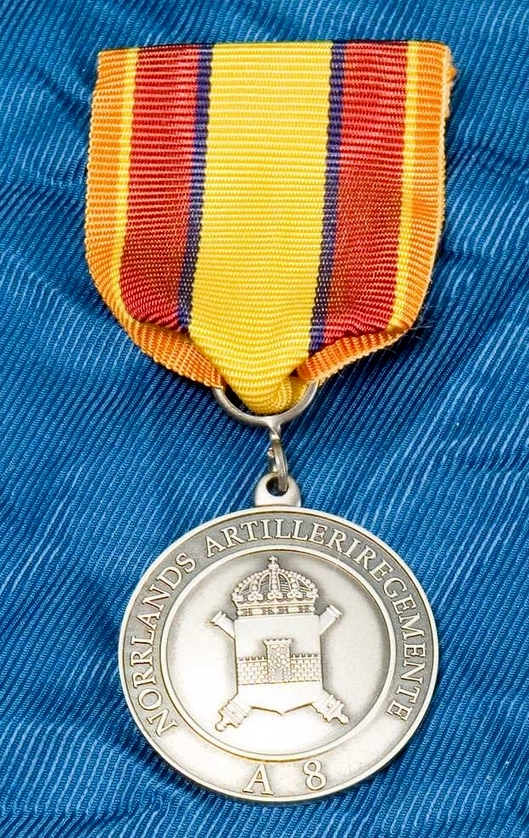
Norrland Artillery Regiment Commemorate Medal, established in 2000

Ribbon bar

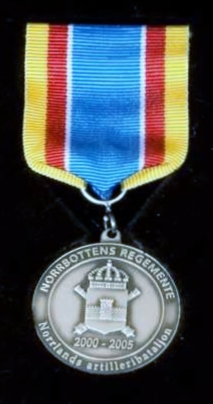
Norrland Artillery Battalion Commemorate Medal, established in 2005

Ribbon bar

== Commanding officers ==
Listed below are the commanding officers during the years 1919–2000. Between 1975 and 1994, the regimental commander also served as the Commandant in Boden Fortress as well as Defence District Commander. During the years 2000–2005, the commander was a lieutenant colonel and was referred to as battalion commander.

- 1919–1922: Sixten Schmidt
- 1922–1926: Axel Lyström
- 1926–1930: Oscar Osterman
- 1930–1935: Axel Lagerfelt
- 1935–1938: Sune Bergelin
- 1938–1942: Folke Ericsson
- 1942–1946: Axel Philipson
- 1946–1951: Ivan Walter Thorson
- 1951–1955: Fredrik Hård af Segerstad
- 1955–1959: Sven Esaias Sandahl
- 1959–1964: Carl Gustaf Dahlberg
- 1964–1966: Olof Emil Fingal von Sydow
- 1966–1968: Karl-Gösta Lundmark
- 1968–1969: Bengt Liljestrand
- 1969–1973: Bertil Malgerud
- 1973–1975: Nils Landergren
- 1975–1980: Sven Skeppstedt
- 1980–1983: Reinhold Lahti
- 1983–1992: Thure Wadenholt
- 1993–1994: Göran Honkamaa
- 1994–1997: Jan Frank
- 1997–2000: Torsten Gerhardsson
- 2000–2002: Kennet Eriksson
- 2003–2004: Johnny Börjesson
- 2004–2005: Anders Callert
- 2022–2023: Magnus Ståhl
- 2023–2026: Stephan Sjöberg
- 2026–20xx: Jan Karlsson
- 2026-07-01 - 2026-08-31: Lieutenant Colonel Mikael Dalin (acting)

== Names, designations and locations ==
| Name | Translation | From | | To |
|---|---|---|---|---|
| Kungl. Bodens artilleribataljon | Royal Boden Artillery Battalion | 1906-09-01 | – | 1919-09-09 |
| Kungl. Bodens artilleriregemente | Royal Boden Artillery Regiment | 1919-09-10 | – | 1974-12-31 |
| Bodens artilleriregemente | Boden Artillery Regiment | 1975-01-01 | – | 1997-12-31 |
| Norrlands artilleriregemente | Norrland Artillery Regiment | 1998-01-01 | – | 2000-06-30 |
| Norrlands artilleribataljon | Norrland Artillery Battalion | 2000-07-01 | – | 2004-12-31 |
| Avvecklingsorganisation | Decommissioning Organization | 2005-01-01 | – | 2005-12-31 |
| Bodens artilleriregemente | Boden Artillery Regiment | 2022-01-01 | – | |
| Designation | | From | | To |
| A 8 B | | 1906-09-01 | – | 1919-09-09 |
| A 8 | | 1919-09-10 | – | 1975-06-30 |
| A 8/Fo 63 | | 1975-07-01 | – | 1994-06-30 |
| A 8 | | 1994-07-01 | – | 2000-06-30 |
| Artbat/I 19 | | 2000-07-01 | – | 2005-12-31 |
| A 8 | | 2022-01-01 | – | |
| Location | | From | | To |
| Boden Garrison/Åbergsleden | | 1906-09-01 | – | 2005-12-31 |
| Boden Garrison/Sveavägen | | 2022-01-01 | – | |

== See also ==
- List of Swedish artillery regiments
