= Norrbotten Brigade =

- Norrbottensbrigaden
- Active: 1949–2000; 2022–present
- Country: Sweden
- Branch: Swedish Army
- Part of: Norrbotten Regiment (peacetime); 1st Division (wartime)
- Headquarters: Boden Garrison
- Mottos: De hava aldrig svikit eller för egen del tappat ("They have never failed or for their own part lost")
- Beret colour: Black
- March: "Finska rytteriets marsch" (Note: Composed by Zacharias Topelius. The march was adopted in 1994.)
- Battle honours: Landskrona (1677); Düna (1701); Kliszów (1702); Fraustadt (1706); Malatitze (1708); Strömstad (1717)

Commanders
- Commander: Col Gustaf Dufberg

Insignia
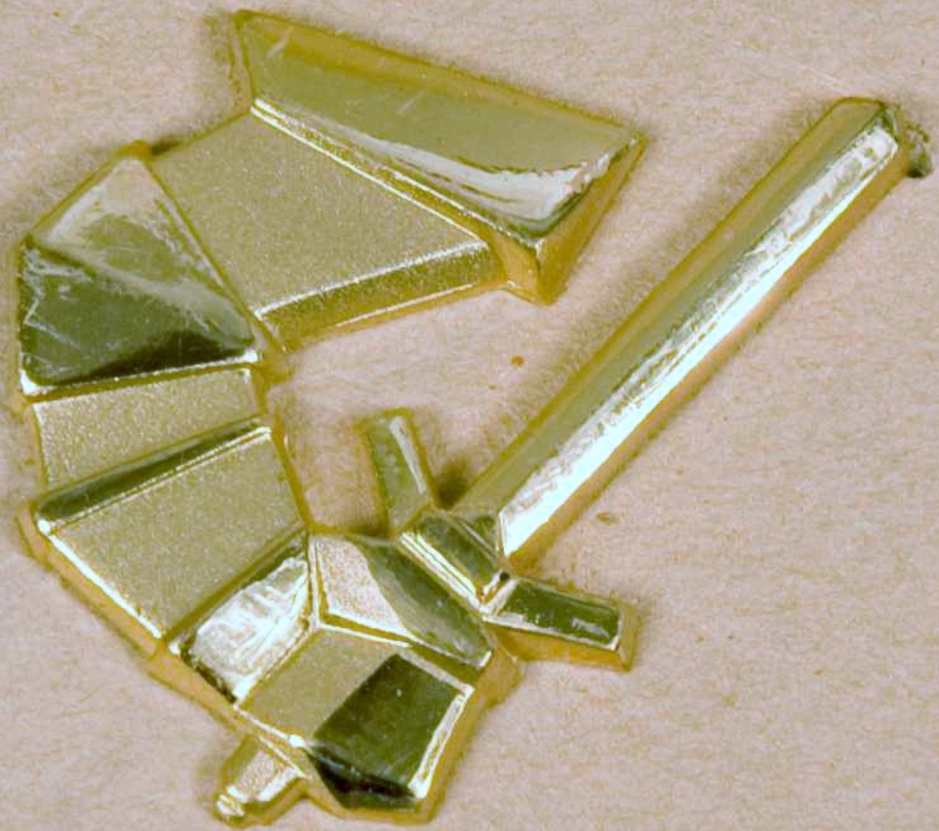
- Branch insignia

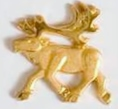
- Unit insignia

The Norrbotten Brigade, (Note: Swedish: Norrbottensbrigaden, "Norrbotten Brigade") also known as the 19th Arctic Mechanised Brigade (NMekB 19), is a mechanised brigade of the Swedish Army based in Norrbotten County. It has been active since 2022, having previously served between 1949 and 2000. It is headquartered at Boden Garrison.

== History ==
Norrbotten Brigade was originally an infantry brigade which in 1964 became the second of a total of five brigades, which was organised as an arctic brigade.

In 1994, the brigade, along with the regiment (I 19/P 5) formed the Norrland Mechanised Brigade (MekB 19). The brigade consisted of two tank battalions equipped with Leopard 2s and Combat Vehicle 90s, and two mechanised battalions equipped with CV90.

The unit was disbanded as a result of the disarmament policies set forward in the Defence Act of 2000. In 2021, following the Defence Act of 2020, the 3rd Brigade was disbanded and the equipment was transferred to the Norrbotten Brigade which would be re-established in 2022 with the task of defending the Swedish north.

=== Organisation ===
As of 2022, the planned wartime organisation of the Norrbotten Brigade at full operational capacity is as follows, with full capability expected to be reached by 2028:

- 19th Arctic Mechanised Brigade (Note: Responsible for the defence of northern Sweden.)
  - 19th Brigade Staff
    - 19th Brigade Command Company (Note: Organised from the 11th Management Battalion of the Command and Control Regiment.)
    - 19th Brigade Reconnaissance Company
    - 19th Brigade Air Defence Company
    - 19th Brigade Signals Company (Note: Organised from the 12th Signals Battalion of the Command and Control Regiment.)
  - 191st Mechanised Battalion
  - 192nd Mechanised Battalion
  - 193rd Mechanised Battalion
  - 19th Brigade Artillery Battalion (Note: Organised from the 91st Artillery Battalion of the Boden Artillery Regiment.)
  - 19th Brigade Engineer Battalion (Note: Organised from the 22nd Engineer Battalion of the Göta Engineer Regiment.)
  - 19th Brigade Support Battalion (Note: Organised from the 2nd Logistics Battalion of the Göta Logistic Regiment.)
  - 19th Tank Transport Company (Note: Organised from the 1st Heavy Transport Company of the Skaraborg Regiment.)

== Heraldry and traditions ==
The Norrbotten Regiment and Norrbotten Brigade inherited heraldry and traditions from the Norrbotten Regiment.

=== Coat of arms ===
The coat of arms of the Norrbotten Regiment and Norrbotten Brigade (MekB 19) 1994–2000 was also used by the Norrbotten Armoured Battalion (P 5) 1957–1975. Blazon: "Azure, powdered with estoiles or, the provincial badge of Västerbotten, a reindeer courant argent, armed and langued gules. The shield surmounted two arms in fess, embowed and vambraced, the hands holding swords in saltire, or".

=== March ===
By the end of the 1800s, Norrbotten Regiment adopted the march "Norrbottens fältjägare" (Sundgrén). In 1916 it adopted the march "Finska rytteriets marsch" which was used from 1916 to 1927 together with Karlskrona Grenadier Regiment (I 7). Karlskrona Grenadier Regiment used the march as an inheritance from the Småland Hussar Regiment (Smålands husarregemente, K 4). After the regiment was amalgamated into a brigade in 1994, the brigade came to use the march. From 2000 it is used again by the regiment.

== Commanders ==
The commanders of the brigade throughout its history are as follows:

- 1949–1993: ?
- 1993–1994: Col Bengt Jerkland
- 1994–1999: Col Lars-Gunnar Nilsson
- 1999–2000: Col Per Lodin
- 2000–2022: Inactive
- 2022–2023: Col Lars O Jonsson
- 2023–2024: Col Gustaf Dufberg
- 2024–present: Col Daniel Rydberg

== Attributes ==
Name	Translation	From		To
Norrbottensbrigaden	Norrbotten Brigade	1949-10-01	–	1994-06-30
Norrbottens regemente och Norrbottensbrigaden	Norrbotten Regiment and Norrbotten Brigade	1994-07-01	–	2000-06-30
Norrbottensbrigaden / 19. Norrlandsmekaniserade brigaden	Norrbotten Brigade / 19th Norrland Mechanized Brigade	2022-01-01	–	
Designation		From		To
IB 19		1949-10-01	–	1964-??-??
NB 19		1964-??-??	–	1994-06-30
MekB 19		1994-07-01	–	2000-06-30
NMekB 19		2022-01-01	–	
Location		From		To
Boden Garrison		1949-10-01	–	2000-06-30
Boden Garrison		2022-01-01	–	

== See also ==
- Norrbotten Regiment
- List of Swedish Army brigades

== Sources ==
- Braunstein, Christian (2003). Sveriges arméförband under 1900-talet. Skrift / Statens försvarshistoriska museer, 1101-7023; 5 (in Swedish). Stockholm: Statens försvarshistoriska museer. ISBN 91-971584-4-5. SELIBR 8902928.
- Braunstein, Christian (2006). Heraldiska vapen inom det svenska försvaret [Heraldry of the Swedish Armed Forces] (PDF). Skrift / Statens försvarshistoriska museer, 1101-7023; 9 (in Swedish). Stockholm: Statens försvarshistoriska museer. ISBN 91-971584-9-6. SELIBR 10099224. Archived from the original (PDF) on 2020-10-02.
- Kjellander, Rune (2003). Sveriges regementschefer 1700-2000: chefsbiografier och förbandsöversikter (in Swedish). Stockholm: Probus. ISBN 91-87184-74-5. SELIBR 8981272.
- Sandberg, Bo (2007). Försvarets marscher och signaler förr och nu: marscher antagna av svenska militära förband, skolor och staber samt igenkännings-, tjänstgörings- och exercissignaler (in Swedish) (New ed.). Stockholm: Militärmusiksamfundet med Svenskt marscharkiv. ISBN 978-91-631-8699-8. SELIBR 10413065.
- Försvarsmakten (2022). "Planerad utveckling av krigsorganisationen 2021-2030" [Planned development of the war organization 2021-2030] (PDF). forsvarsmakten.se (in Swedish). Archived from the original (PDF) on 2022-03-10.
- Riksdagen (2020-10-15). "Totalförsvaret 2021–2025 (Proposition 2020/21:30)". riksdagen.se (in Swedish).
- Carlsson, Mats (2024-12-03). "Sambands- och ledningssoldater - viktiga byggstenar till Norrbottensbrigaden". forsvarsmakten.se (in Swedish).
- Bratt, Stefan, ed. (2022). "Artilleristen Lars leder arbetet med att utöka och utveckla Norrbottensbrigaden". Artilleri & luftvärn: Artilleri-tidskrift (in Swedish) (3). Halmstad: Artilleri- och Luftvärnsklubben. ISSN 004-3788. SELIBR 22136789 – via Issuu.
- "NY CHEF FÖR NORRBOTTENSBRIGADEN – LÅSET I NORR" (in Swedish). Norrbotten Regiment. 2024-04-11 – via Facebook.
