= Sven-Åke Jansson =

Swedish Army officer

- Born: 25 October 1937; Ängelholm, Sweden
- Died: 10 September 2014 (aged 76); Färlöv, Sweden
- Military career
- Allegiance: Sweden
- Branch: Swedish Army
- Service years: 1961–1998
- Rank: Lieutenant General
- Commands: Norrbotten Armoured Battalion; Norrbotten Regiment; South Scanian Regiment; Malmö Defence District; Gotland Military Command; Southern Military District
- Conflicts: Cyprus dispute

Lieutenant General Sven-Åke Jansson (25 October 1937 – 10 September 2014) was a senior Swedish Army officer. He served as commander of Gotland Military Command (1988–1994) and as Commanding General of the Southern Military District (1994–1998).

== Career ==
Jansson was commissioned as an officer in 1961 after graduating from the Swedish Armed Forces School for Secondary Education in Uppsala. He was then assigned to the North Scanian Infantry Regiment (I 6) in Kristianstad. As a second lieutenant, Jansson was ordered in June 1962 to Scanian Armoured Regiment (P 2) to serve in its 1st Company. By company commander Captain Folke Sonesson, Jansson received a thorough education on the Centurion tank. Jansson was then entrusted to command the company during the spring exercises in 1963. Just over a year later, Jansson was commander of the 15th Tank Company in Kristianstad Brigade (Kristianstadsbrigaden, PB 26). As a young lieutenant, he made one of the many exciting efforts that contributed to the North Scanian Regiment (P 6) being able to raise a functioning armored brigade in the surprisingly short time of two years. After graduating from the Swedish Armed Forces Staff College in Stockholm, he became a General Staff Corps officer and served, among other things, in the Defence Staff in Stockholm. He was promoted to captain in 1969, to major in 1972 and to lieutenant colonel in 1977. During this time, Jansson also served as Swedish battalion commander in Cyprus, part of the United Nations Peacekeeping Force in Cyprus (UNFICYP).

In 1980, Jansson was appointed commander of Norrbotten Armoured Battalion in Boden. He then served as head of Section 2 in the Upper Norrland Military District (Milo ÖN) in Boden from 1981 to 1983. Jansson was promoted to colonel in 1983 and served as section chief in the Operations Command of the Upper Norrland Military District (Milo ÖN) from 1983 to 1984. Jansson was then commander of Norrbotten Regiment with Norrbotten Armoured Battalion (I 19/P 5) from 1984 to 1986. Jansson was promoted to senior colonel in 1986 and moved from Boden to Ystad after being appointed commander of the South Scanian Regiment and Malmö Defence District (P 7/Fo 11), serving until 1988. He was promoted to major general in 1988 and was Commanding General of the Gotland Military Command in Visby from 1 April 1988 to 30 June 1994. Jansson was promoted to lieutenant general and appointed Commanding General of the Southern Military District (Milo S) in Kristianstad on 1 July 1994, serving until 1 July 1998 when he was succeeded by lieutenant general Kent Harrskog. During his tenure as commander of Milo S, Scanian Anti-Aircraft Corps in Ystad was disbanded and the South Scanian Regiment moved from Ystad to Revingehed outside Lund.

As a newly retired, he worked as a consultant and also as an adviser to the newly formed Lithuanian Armed Forces.

== Personal life ==
On 3 July 1965, Jansson married Anges Anita (born 1942). They had three children: Hans Kristian (born 1966), Agnes Helena (born 1970) and Anna Kristina (born 1971).

In 1997, he and his wife Anita bought the rectory in Färlöv in Scania.

== Death ==
Jansson died on 10 September 2014 in Färlöv, Sweden. He was interred on 14 November 2014 at the Eastern cemetery in Kristianstad.

== Dates of rank ==
- 1961 – Second lieutenant
- 19?? – Lieutenant
- 1969 – Captain
- 1972 – Major
- 1977 – Lieutenant colonel
- 1983 – Colonel
- 1986 – Senior colonel
- 1988 – Major general
- 1994 – Lieutenant general

== Awards and decorations ==
- (Portugal) Grand Officer of the Order of Prince Henry (15 May 1991)

Military offices
Preceded by Jan Wickbom	Norrbotten Regiment with Norrbotten Armoured Battalion; 1984–1986	Succeeded by Bo Pellnäs
Preceded by Bertil Green	South Scanian Regiment; 1986–1988	Succeeded by Gert Nilsson
Preceded by Lars-Eric Wahlgren	Gotland Military Command; 1988–1994	Succeeded by Göran De Geer
Preceded by Owe Wiktorin	Commanding General, Southern Military District; 1994–1998	Succeeded by Kent Harrskog
