= Bo Pellnäs =

Swedish army officer

- Born: 22 October 1939 (age 86); Stockholm, Sweden
- Military career
- Allegiance: Sweden, UN, OSCE
- Branch: Swedish Army
- Service years: 1961–1995
- Rank: Senior Colonel
- Commands: Norrbotten Regiment with Norrbotten Armoured Battalion
- Conflicts: Bosnian War

Senior Colonel Bo Pellnäs (born 22 October 1939) is a retired officer in the Swedish Army.

== Career ==
Pellnäs was born on 22 October 1939 in Högalid Parish, Stockholm, Sweden. Pellnäs started his studies in Karlstad in 1958 and then went on to serve as an officer in the Swedish Army. He served as commander of the Norrbotten Regiment with Norrbotten Armoured Battalion (I 19/P 5), Swedish battalion commander in Cyprus from 1983 to 1984, head of the United Nations Military Observer's (UNMO) in Afghanistan from 1988 to 1989, head of the United Nations Military Observer's in Balkan during the Yugoslav wars from 1992 to 1993, military advisor to David Owen and Thorvald Stoltenberg from 1993 to 1994, and head of the head of an international mission to monitor the Yugoslav-Bosnian border from 1994 to 1995 when he retired from the military. He later served as head of the OSCE mission office in Belgrade from 1998 to 1999.

Today, Pellnäs is an active commentator on defense policy and security issues in Sweden. He also served as a member of the Swedish Tsunami Commission that was appointed in 2005 to evaluate the Swedish government's response to the 2004 Indian Ocean earthquake.

== Bibliography ==
- Pellnäs, Bo; Byman, Magnus; Nestor, Håkan (1981). Brigadskyttebataljonen: taktik - stridsteknik (in Swedish). [Stockholm]: [Centralförb. för befälsutbildning].
- Pellnäs, Bo (1982). Stridsteknik vid små förband (in Swedish). Stockholm: Centralförb. för befälsutbildning.
- Pellnäs, Bo (1995). Utan slut?: kriget på Balkan : bilder från ett FN-uppdrag (in Swedish). Stockholm: Bonnier. ISBN 91-0-056067-7.
- Pellnäs, Bo (1996). De hundra dagarna: på gränsvakt i Serbien (in Swedish). Stockholm: Bonnier. ISBN 91-0-056234-3.
- Pellnäs, Bo (1998). Deltagande i internationella operationer: konsekvenser för det nationella försvarets utformning. Strategiskt forum för säkerhetspolitik och omvärldsanalys, 99-2870238-1; 4 (in Swedish). Stockholm: Försvarets forskningsanstalt.

Military offices
Preceded by Sven-Åke Jansson	Norrbotten Regiment with Norrbotten Armoured Battalion; 1986–1988	Succeeded by Göran Honkamaa
