= Norrbotten Armoured Battalion =

Swedish Army unit

- Norrbottens pansarbataljon
- Active: 1957–1994, 2000–present
- Country: Sweden
- Allegiance: Swedish Armed Forces
- Branch: Swedish Army
- Type: Armoured
- Role: Recruit training
- Size: Battalion
- Part of: VI. Milo (1957–1966); Milo ÖN (1966–1975); I 19 (1975–1994); I 19 (2000–present)
- Garrison/HQ: Boden
- Motto: Alltid främst ("Always foremost")
- March: I flaggskrud" (Rydberg) (Note: The march was established in 1958 by Army Order 424/1958. The march was used by the Northern Service Regiment (Norra underhållsregementet, Uhreg N) from 1994 to 2001, and again by the Norrbotten Armoured Battalion since 2001.)

Insignia
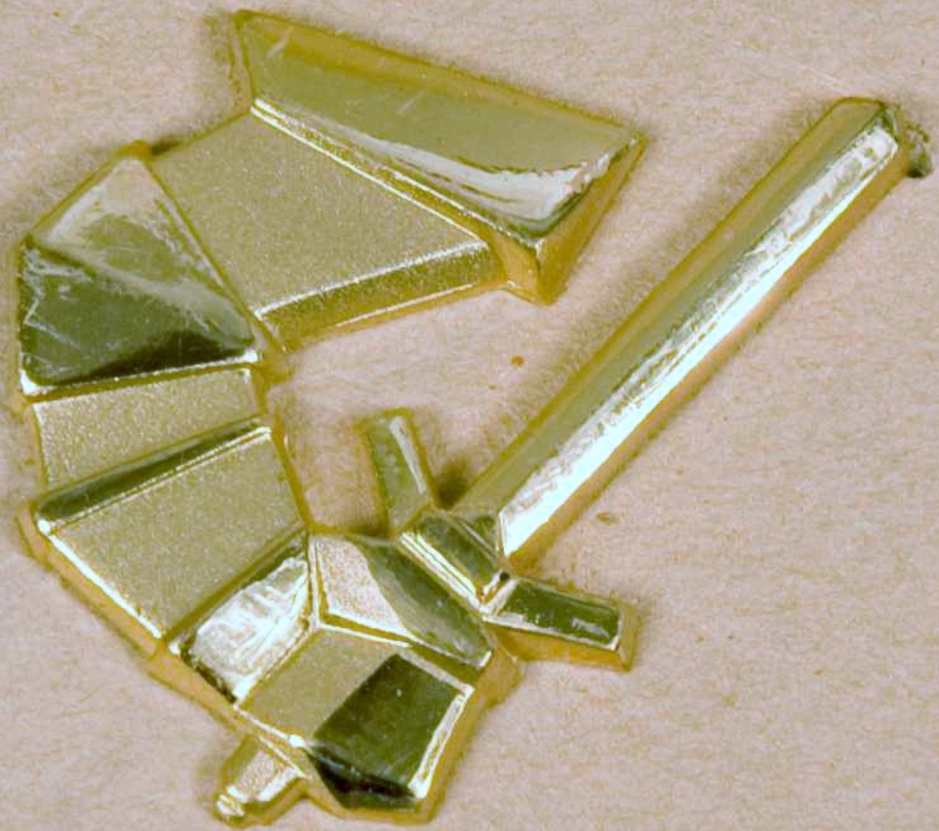
- Branch insignia

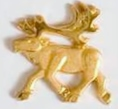
- Unit insignia

The Norrbotten Armoured Battalion (Swedish: Norrbottens pansarbataljon), designation Pbat/I 19 or P 5, is a Swedish Army armoured battalion, one of the few new formations raised in the 20th century. It is still in active service, and is currently garrisoned in Boden, Norrbotten as part of Norrbotten Regiment.

== History ==
The Norrbotten Armored Battalion (P 5) was raised on 1 April 1957, by decision through letters patent of 1 June 1956, based on a parliamentary decision in May 1956. The unit was raised to meet the needs of the armored units in Upper Norrland. On 30 June 1975, the battalion disbanded as an independent unit and on 1 July 1975 it was amalgamated into a training battalion in Norrbotten Regiment (I 19). The name of the regiment was changed to that of the Norrbotten Regiment with the Norrbotten Armored Battalion (I 19/P 5).

For a short time in the 1990s, the regiment ceased to exist as it was merged with the wartime organised Norrbotten Brigade. In 2000, the battalion was re-raised, this time as one of five battalions in Norrbotten Regiment, retaining its old name, but not the designation P 5 (5th Armoured Regiment) it originally had, even though it is still in common use. The battalion is as of 2006 one of the three Swedish Army training regiments for armoured units. The battalion has been garrisoned in Boden during its whole existence.

== Campaigns ==
- None

== Organisation ==
2008

- Support company (Command & control, supply, mortar and recon platoons)
- Armoured infantry company (incl one tank platoon)
- Supply company (Command & Supply, Medics, Repair, Refuel & Ammo and Infantry platoon)
- Infantry company
- Engineer company
- Guard company

2004

- Headquarters/mortar company
- Tank company
- Armoured infantry company
- Supply company

== Heraldry and traditions ==
=== Colours, standards and guidons ===
The unit presents one battalion standard which was established by Army Order 417/1 1959. It was drawn by Brita Grep and embroidered by hand in insertion technique by Libraria. The standard was presented to the former Royal Norrbotten Armoured Battalion (P 5) in Boden by His Majesty the King Gustaf VI Adolf on 28 July 1961. It was used as battalion standard until 1975 and then as a traditional standard at Norrbotten Regiment (I 19). From 1 July 1994, the standard was carried by the Norrbotten Regiment and Norrbotten Brigade (MekB 19). From 1 July 2000, the standard was again carried by the Norrbotten Armoured Battalion. The standard may be used according to the decisions of CO I 19. Blazon: "On blue cloth powdered with yellow estoiles the provincial badge of Västerbotten; a white reindeer at speed, armed and langued red. Blue fringe."

=== Coat of arms ===
The coat of arms of the Norrbotten Armoured Battalion (P 5) 1957–1975 was also used by the Norrbotten Regiment and Norrbotten Brigade (MekB 19) 1994–2000. Blazon: "Azure, powdered with estoiles or, the provincial badge of Västerbotten, a reindeer courant argent, armed and langued gules. The shield surmounted two arms in fess, embowed and vambraced, the hands holding swords in saltire, or".

=== March ===
On 10 July 1958, the Chief of the Army, Lieutenant General Thord Bonde established "I flaggskrud" as the battalion march. On 15 June 1994, the march was taken over by the Northern Service Regiment (Norra underhållsregementet, Uhreg N). From 2001, the march was transferred back to Norrbotten Armoured Battalion.

== Commanding officers ==
Commanding officers from 1957 to 1975:

- 1957–1963: Karl Henrik Bergh
- 1963–1966: Nils Olof Axel Östlund
- 1966–1967: Per Anton Björkman
- 1967–1968: Per Gunnar Brissman
- 1968–1975: Arne Gillis Hallner Hallagård
- 1975–1975: Stig Barke
- 1975–1980: ?
- 1980–1981: Sven-Åke Jansson

== Names, designations and locations ==
Name	Translation	From		To
Kungl Norrbottens pansarbataljon	Royal Norrbotten Armoured Battalion	1957-04-01	–	1974-12-31
Norrbottens pansarbataljon	Norrbotten Armoured Battalion	1975-01-01	–	1975-06-30
Norrbottens regemente med Norrbottens pansarbataljon	Norrbotten Regiment with Norrbotten Armoured Battalion	1975-07-01	–	1994-06-30
Norrbottens pansarbataljon	Norrbotten Armoured Battalion	2000-07-01	–	
Designation		From		To
P 5		1957-04-01	–	1975-06-30
I 19/P 5		1975-07-01	–	1994-06-30
Pbat/I 19		2000-07-01	–	
Location		From		To
Boden Garrison		1957-04-01	–	1994-06-30
Boden Garrison		2000-07-01	–	

== See also ==
- List of Swedish armoured regiments
