= Bergslagen Artillery Regiment =

Swedish Army artillery unit

- Bergslagens artilleriregemente
- Active: 1943–2000, 2022–present
- Country: Sweden
- Allegiance: Swedish Armed Forces
- Branch: Swedish Army
- Type: Artillery
- Size: Regiment
- Part of: Bergslagen Military District (1943–1991); Middle Military District (1991–2000)
- Garrison/HQ: Kristinehamn
- Motto: Ultima ratio regum ("The last resort of kings")
- Colors: Light grey
- March: "Artilleri V" (Ström) (Note: The march was inherited from Norrbotten Artillery Corps (A 5) and was established in 1953 by Army Order 33/1953. The march replaced "Schneidige Truppe" (Lehnhardt) which was used 1944–1952.)
- Anniversaries: 9 September; 4 December (Note: 4 December is saint day of Saint Barbara.)

Commanders
- Current commander: COL Lars O Jonsson

Insignia
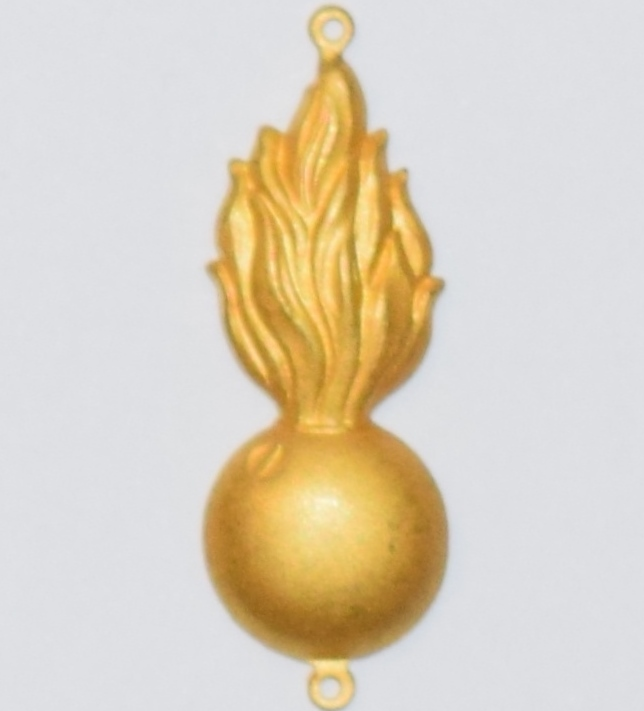
- Branch insignia

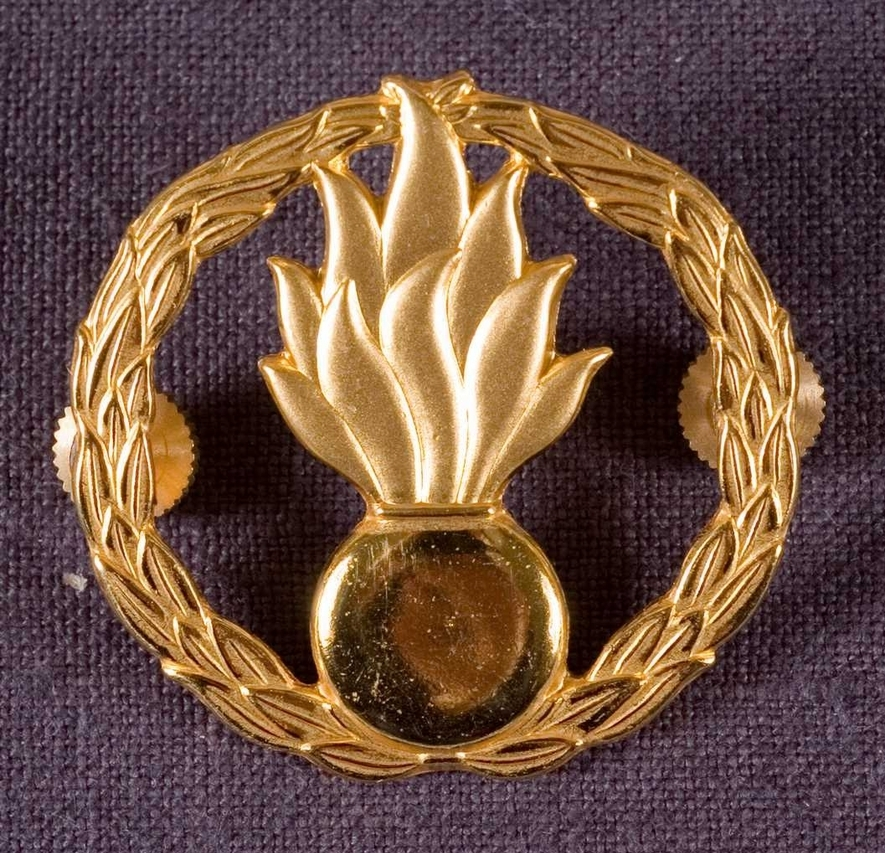
- Cap badge

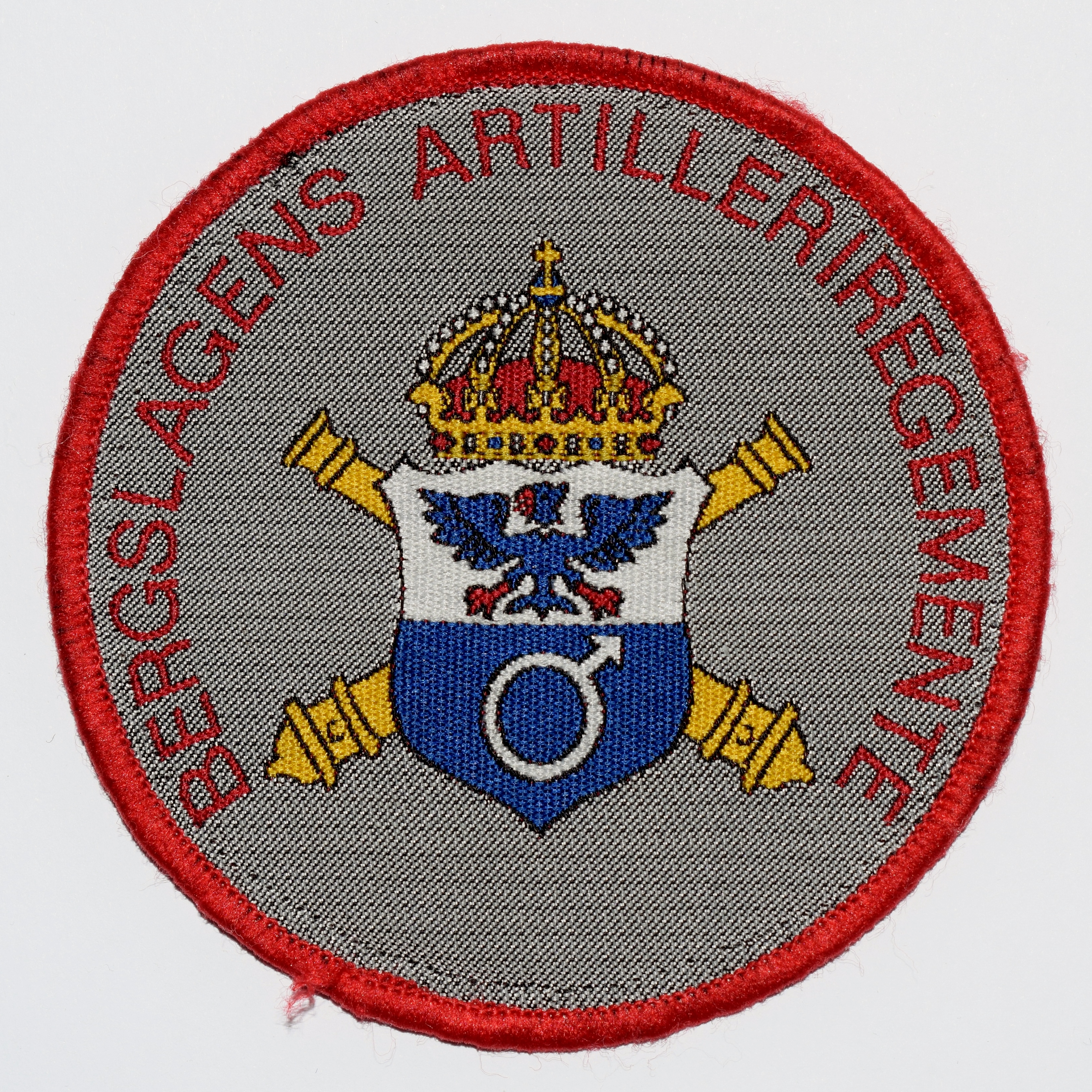
- Shoulder sleeve insignia (1986–2000)

The Bergslagen Artillery Regiment (Swedish: Bergslagens artilleriregemente), designation A 9, is a Swedish Army artillery unit which has operated in various forms from 1943 to 2000 and again from 4 December 2022 after the Swedish government decided to re-form the regiment in Kristinehamn as Bergslagen Artillery Regiment (A 9) with full operational capability reached by 2025.

== History ==
The regiment was created as part of a build-up of the Swedish Army during World War II, so that Sweden's neutrality could be protected. In accordance with the Defence Act of 2000, the regiment and the other artillery regiments of the Swedish Army were amalgamated into the Artillery Regiment, in Kristinehamn, which took the A 9 designation from the Bergslagen Artillery Regiment.

The regiment was re-inaugurated by His Royal Highness Prince Carl Philip, Duke of Värmland in Brogårdshallen in Kristinehamn on 4 December 2022. To the tunes of the Royal Swedish Army Band and Swedish flags as a background, A 9's standard from the Boden Artillery Regiment (A 8), was returned.

== Heraldry and traditions ==
=== Colours, standards and guidons ===
When the regiment was raised it was presented with a regimental standard by Crown Prince Gustaf Adolf on 27 April 1945. The regiment also took over some traditions from the Uppland Artillery Regiment (A 5), including the march. The colour was taken over from the Position Artillery Regiment (Positionsartilleriregementet, A 9).

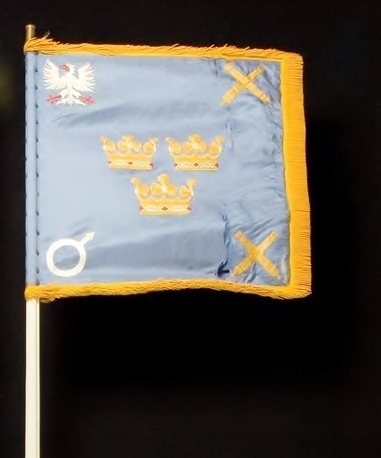
The 1945 standard.

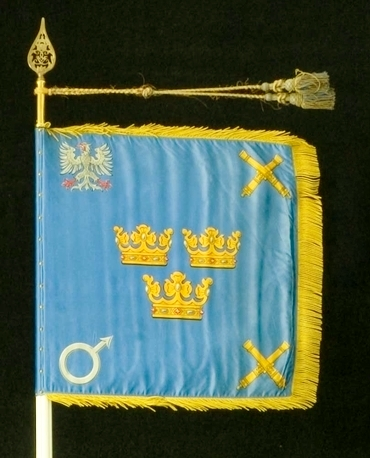
The guard standard

=== Coat of arms ===
The coat of the arms of the Bergslagen Artillery Regiment (A 9) 1977–2000. Blazon: "Per pale argent and azure; argent an eagle wings elevated and displayed azure, armed and langued gules, azure an iron sign argent. The shield surmoun-ted two gunbarrels of older pattern in saltire or. The gunbarrels may be sable".

=== Medals ===
In 1944, the Bergslagens artilleriregementes (A 9) idrottsmedalj ("Bergslagen Artillery Regiment (A 9) Sports Medal") in gold (BergslartregidrottGM) of the 8th size was established. The medal ribbon is divided in blue and white moiré.

In 1950, the Kamratföreningen Bergslagsartilleristers (A 9) förtjänstmedalj ("ervice Club of Bergslagen Artillery (A 9) Medal of Merit") in silver (KBergartSM) of the 8th size. The medal ribbon is of blue moiré with white edges and a broad white stripe on each side.

In 1991, the Bergslagens artilleriregementes (A 9) förtjänstmedalj ("Bergslagen Artillery Regiment (A 9) Medal of Merit") in silver (BergartregSM) of the 8th size was established. The medal ribbon is of red moiré with a broad grey stripe on each side.

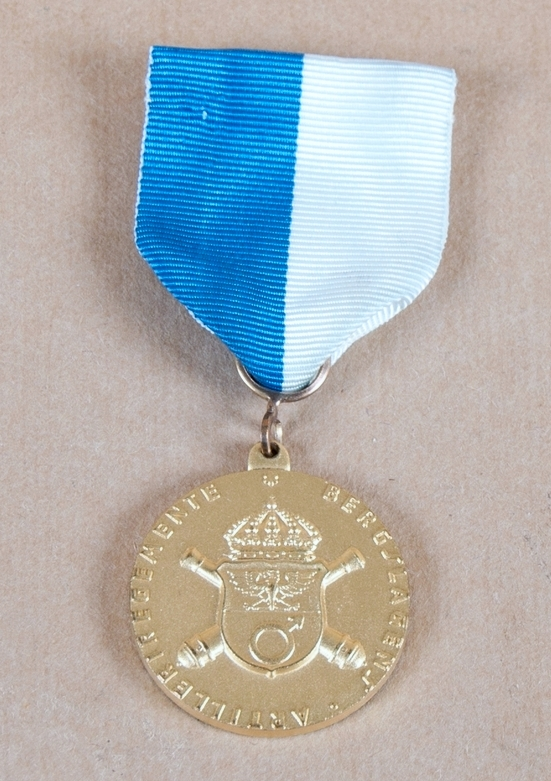
The Bergslagen Artillery Regiment (A 9) Sports Medal.

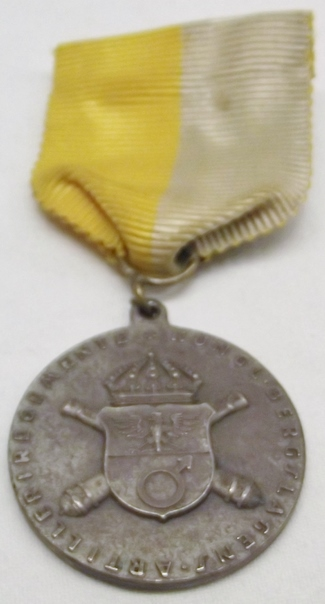
Medal of the Bergslagen Artillery Regiment Shooting Association.

== Commanding officers ==
Regimental commander from 1943 to 30 June 2000.

- 1943–1946: Carl Årmann
- 1946–1952: Axel Philipson
- 1952–1955: Thorsten Berggren
- 1955–1959: Fredrik Hård
- 1959–1964: Sven Sandahl
- 1964–1965: Nils Holmstedt
- 1965–1974: Sten Claëson
- 1974–1982: Gösta Mittag-Leffler
- 1982–1986: Carl Carlsson
- 1986–1992: Lars Carlson
- 1992–1994: Kjell Forssmark
- 1994–2000: Birger Almlöw
- 2022-12-01 – 20xx: Lars O Jonsson

== Names, designations and locations ==
Name	Translation	From		To
Kungl Bergslagens artilleriregemente	Royal Bergslagen Artillery Regiment	1943-07-01	–	1974-12-31
Bergslagens artilleriregemente	Bergslagen Artillery Regiment	1975-01-01	–	2000-06-30
Bergslagens artilleriregemente	Bergslagen Artillery Regiment	2022-??-??	–	
Designation		From		To
–		1811-02-05	–	1861-07-15
A 9		1943-07-01	–	2000-06-30
A 9		2022-??-??	–	
Location		From		To
Kristinehamn Garrison		1943-07-01	–	2000-06-30
Kristinehamn Garrison		2022-??-??	–	

== See also ==
- List of Swedish artillery regiments
