= Norrbotten Regiment =

Swedish Army regiment

Coordinates: 65.8198°N 21.6587°E

- Norrbottens regemente
- Active: 1841–1994, 2000–present
- Country: Sweden
- Allegiance: Swedish Armed Forces
- Branch: Swedish Army
- Type: Armoured, arctic light infantry
- Role: Recruit training
- Size: Regiment
- Part of: Swedish Armed Forces Headquarters (Note: 6th Military District (1833–1847) 5th Military District (1847–1888) 6th Military District (1889–1893) 6th Army Division (1893–1901) VI Army Division (1902–1927) Upper Norrland's Troops (1928–1942) VI Military District (1942–1966) Upper Norrland Military District (1966–1993) Northern Military District (1993–1994) Joint Forces Command (2000–2005) Swedish Armed Forces Headquarters (2005–present))
- Garrison/HQ: Boden
- Mottos: De hava aldrig wikit eller för egen del tappat ("Never have they yielded, nor given ground") (Note: This opinion of the then Västerbotten Regiment was mentioned by King Gustaf III before the 1788 campaign. Norrbotten Regiment originated in Västerbotten Regiment, and the motto accompanied both regiments in the 1841 split. The motto is today also used by the 13th Home Guard Battalion.)
- Colors: Blue and white
- March: "Norrbottens fältjägare" (Sundgrén) (1890s–1916) "Finska rytteriets marsch" (Unknown) (Note: The march was adopted in 1916 and established in 1953 by Army Order 33/1953. The march was used by the Norrbotten Brigade from 1994 to 2000.)
- Anniversaries: 8 September
- Battle honours: Landskrona (1677), Düna (1701), Kliszow (1702), Fraustadt (1706), Malatitze (1708), Strömstad (1717)

Commanders
- Current commander: COL Mats Ludvig

Insignia
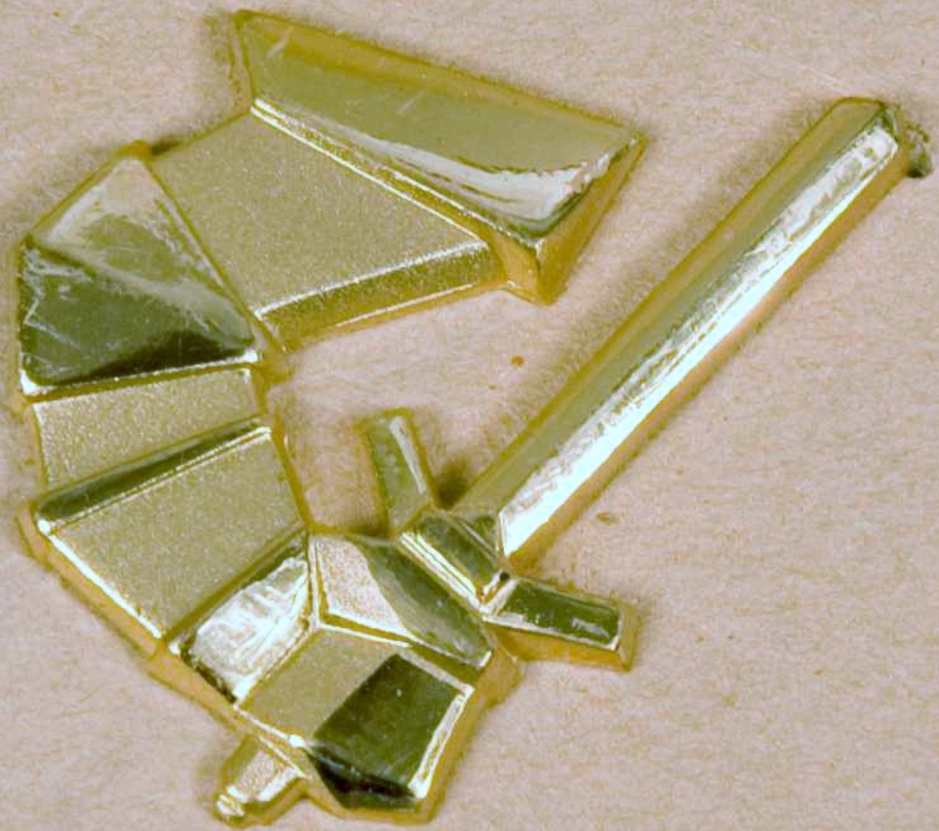
- Branch insignia

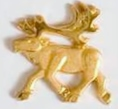
- Unit insignia

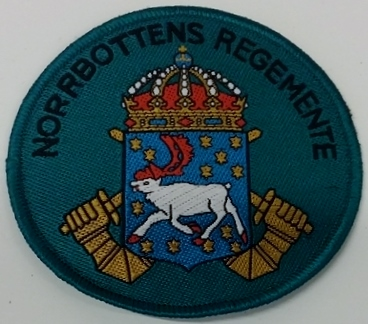
- Shoulder sleeve insignia

The 19th Infantry Regiment, more commonly known as Norrbotten Regiment (Swedish: Norrbottens regemente), designation I 19, is a Swedish Army arctic armoured, light infantry and commando regiment that traces its origins back to the 19th century. The regiment's soldiers were originally recruited from the province of Norrbotten, and it is currently garrisoned in Boden, Norrbotten. The regiment has the responsibility for training two armoured and one special recon battalion, as well as number of Arctic light infantry battalions from the home guard as well as running the army's winter unit.

As of 2018, the Norrbotten Regiment employs 489 professional officers, 402 full-time soldiers, 512 part-time soldiers, 116 civilians and 683 reserve officers.

== History ==
The regiment was created in 1841 when Västerbotten Field Jäger Regiment was split into two corps units of battalion size, one of them being Norrbotten Field Jäger Corps. The unit was upgraded to regimental size and renamed Norrbotten Regiment in 1892. The regiment had its training grounds at various places in Norrbotten, but was eventually garrisoned in Boden in 1907. A ski battalion was created in 1910, and in 1943 this ski battalion was split off from the regiment, later becoming The Army Ranger School and in 1975 Lapland Ranger Regiment.

The regiment merged with the Norrbotten Armoured Battalion (P 5) in 1975 to form Norrbotten Regiment with Norrbotten Armoured Battalion, designated I 19/P 5. For a short time in the 1990s, the unit was then merged with the wartime-organised Norrbotten Brigade, and designated MekB 19. In 2000, the unit was reorganised once again, and was redesignated back to its old designation I 19 despite being an armoured regiment, the name was also changed back to Norrbotten Regiment.

== Organisation ==
1841

- Life company
- Piteå Company
- Kalix Company
- Råneå Company

2000

- Norrbotten Armoured Battalion
- Norrland Artillery Battalion
- Norrland Engineer Battalion
- Norrland Air Defence Battalion
- Norrland Signal Battalion

2007

- Norrbotten Armoured Battalion
- Army Ranger Battalion
- Lappland Ranger Group
- Norrbotten Group
- Västerbotten Group
- Field Ranger Group
- West Norrland Group
- Försvarsmaktens vinterenhet (Armed Forces Winter Unit)

The current organisation of the regiment includes:

- Regimental Headquarters, in Boden
- 3rd Brigade Staff
- Norrbotten Armoured Battalion
- Army Ranger Battalion, in Arvidsjaur
- Swedish Armed Forces Winter Unit

== Heraldry and traditions ==
=== Colours, standards and guidons ===
The Norrbotten Regiment presents one regimental colour, three battalion colours and two battalion standards:

==== Colour of Norrbotten Regiment ====
On 31 August 1974, the regiment was presented with a new colour by His Majesty the King Gustaf VI Adolf in connection with the 350th anniversary of the regiment. When the Norrbotten Armoured Battalion (P 5) was amalgamated with the regiment, its standard was carried to the side of the regimental colour. The standard is carried again by the Norrbotten Armoured Battalion since 1 July 2000.

A new colour was presented to the regiment in Boden by His Majesty the King Carl XVI Gustaf on 27 August 2001. The colour is drawn by Kristina Holmgård-Åkerberg and embroidered by machine and hand in insertion technique by Maj-Britt Salander/company Blå Kusten. Blazon: "On blue cloth powdered with yellow estoiles, the provincial badge of Västerbotten; a white reindeer at speed, armed and langued red. On a white border at the upper side of the colour, battle honours (Landskrona 1677, Düna 1701, Kliszow 1702, Fraustadt 1706, Malatitze 1708, Strömstad 1717) in blue and close to the staff the provincial badge of Lappland; a red savage with green garlands on head and around loins, clutching a yellow club on right shoulder (a legacy from the former Lappland Brigade, NB 20).

A new colour was presented to the regiment in Boden by His Majesty the King Carl XVI Gustaf on 7 September 2019. The colour is drawn by Henrik Dahlström, heraldic artist and graphic designer at the State Herald at the National Archives of Sweden. The colour was made by Friends of Handicraft in Stockholm, which is a subcontractor to the Swedish Army Museum. Pre- and post-work as well as embroidery work were done by Viola Edin and Anna Eriksson at company Konstbrodöserna. The wild man in red (I 20's coat of arms) that was to the left of the battle honours in the old colour has been removed, as the Västerbotten Group (Västerbottensgruppen), that carry those traditions, from 2020 belongs to Northern Military Region with the Västerbotten Group in Umeå.

==== Colour of Norrland Artillery Battalion ====
The colour is drawn by Kristina Holmgård-Åkerberg and embroidered by machine in insertion technique by Sofie Thorburn. The colour was presented to the battalion in Kristinehamn by His Majesty the King Carl XVI Gustaf on 15 April 2002. The colour may be used according to the decisions of CO I 19. Blazon: "On blue cloth in the centre the lesser coat of arms of Sweden, three yellow crowns placed two and one. In the first corner the town badge of Boden; a white wall with a gatetower embattled (the original name of the battalion was Boden Artillery Regiment, A 8), in the second corner two crossed yellow gunbarrels of older pattern, in the third corner the provincial badge of Västerbotten, a white reindeer at speed, armed red (a legacy from the former Norrbotten Artillery Corps, A 5) and in the fourth corner the provincial badge of Jämtland, a white elk passant, attacked on its back by a rising falcon and in the front by a rampant dog, both yellow; all animals armed red (a legacy from the former Norrland Artillery Regiment, A 4)."

==== Colour of Norrland Engineer Battalion ====
The colour is drawn by Kristina Holmgård-Åkerberg and embroidered by machine and hand (the badge) in insertion technique by the company Libraria. The colour was presented to the then Norrland Engineer Battalion in Boden by His Majesty the King Carl XVI Gustaf on 27 August 2001. The colour may be used according to the decisions of CO I 19. Blazon: "On blue cloth in the centre the lesser coat of arms of Sweden, three yellow crowns placed two and one. In the first corner a mullet with a cluster of rays, all in yellow. In the lower part of this the coat of arms of the unit; argent, throughout a wall with a gatetower both embattled gules (the original name of the battalion was Royal Boden Engineers Regiment, Ing 3); on a chief azure three open crowns in fess or (a legacy from the former Svea Engineer Regiment, Ing 1). The shield ensigned with a royal crown proper.

==== Colour of Norrland Signal Battalion ====
The colour is drawn by Brita Grep and embroidered by hand in insertion technique by the company Libraria. The colour was presented to the then Royal Norrland Signal Battalion (S 3) in Boden by His Majesty King Gustaf VI Adolf on 7 July 1961. It was used as regimental colour by S 3 until 1 July 2000. The colour may be used according to the decisions of CO I 19. Blazon: "On blue cloth in the centre the lesser coat of arms of Sweden, three yellow crowns placed two and one. In the first corner a mullet with a cluster of rays, all yellow. In the lower part of this placed upon a cluster of yellow bolts, the provincial coat of arms of Västerbotten; azure powdered with estoiles or, a reindeer at speed argent armed and langued gules. The shield ensigned with a royal crown proper."

==== Standard of Norrland Air Defence Battalion ====
The standard is drawn by Brita Grep and embroidered by hand in insertion technique by the Kedja studio, Heraldica. The standard was presented to the then Royal Luleå Anti-Aircraft Corps (Lv 7) in Luleå by the military commander of the VI Military District, Major General Nils Rosenblad in 1943. It was used as regimental standard by Lv 7 until 1 July 2000. The standard may be used according to the decisions of CO I 19. Blazon: "On blue cloth in the centre the lesser coat of arms of Sweden, three open yellow crowns placed two and one. In the first corner the town badge of Luleå; two white keys, the left inverted (the original name of the battalion was Luleå Anti-Aircraft Corps). In the other corners two winged yellow gunbarrels of older pattern in saltire. Yellow fringe."

==== Standard of Norrbotten Armoured Battalion ====
The standard is drawn by Brita Grep and embroidered by hand in insertion technique by Libraria. The standard was presented to the former Royal Norrbotten Armoured Battalion (P 5) in Boden by His Majesty the King Gustaf VI Adolf on 28 July 1961. It was used as battalion standard until 1975 and then as a traditional standard at I 19 up to 1 July 2000. The standard may be used according to the decisions of CO I 19. Blazon: "On blue cloth powdered with yellow estoiles the provincial badge of Västerbotten; a white reindeer at speed, armed and langued red. Blue fringe."

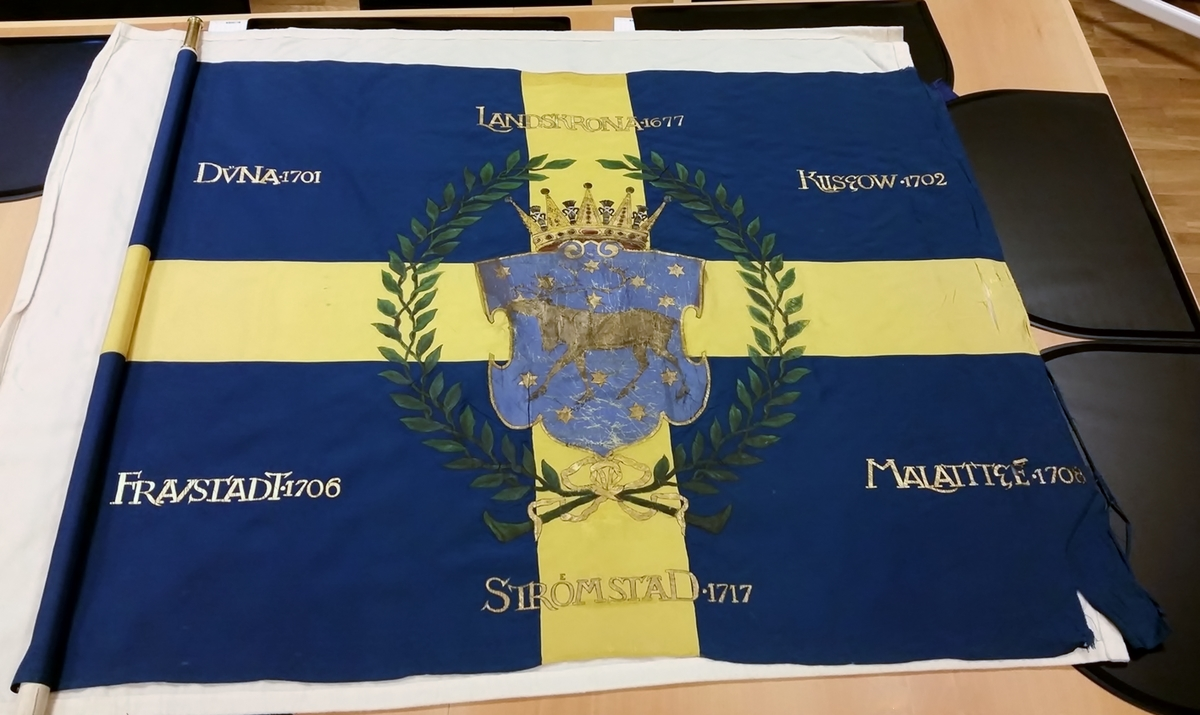
1901 colour of the 2nd Battalion, Norrbotten Regiment.

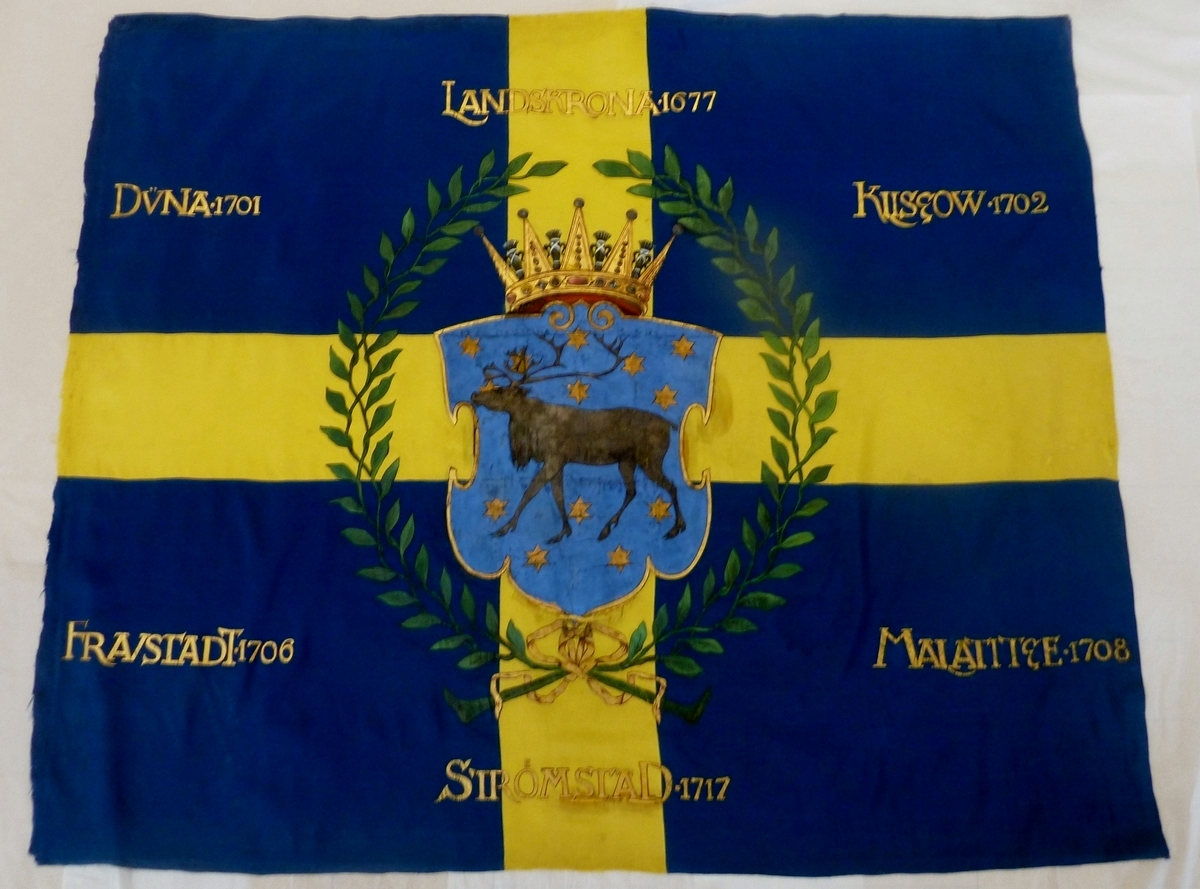
1901 colour of the 3rd Battalion, Norrbotten Regiment.

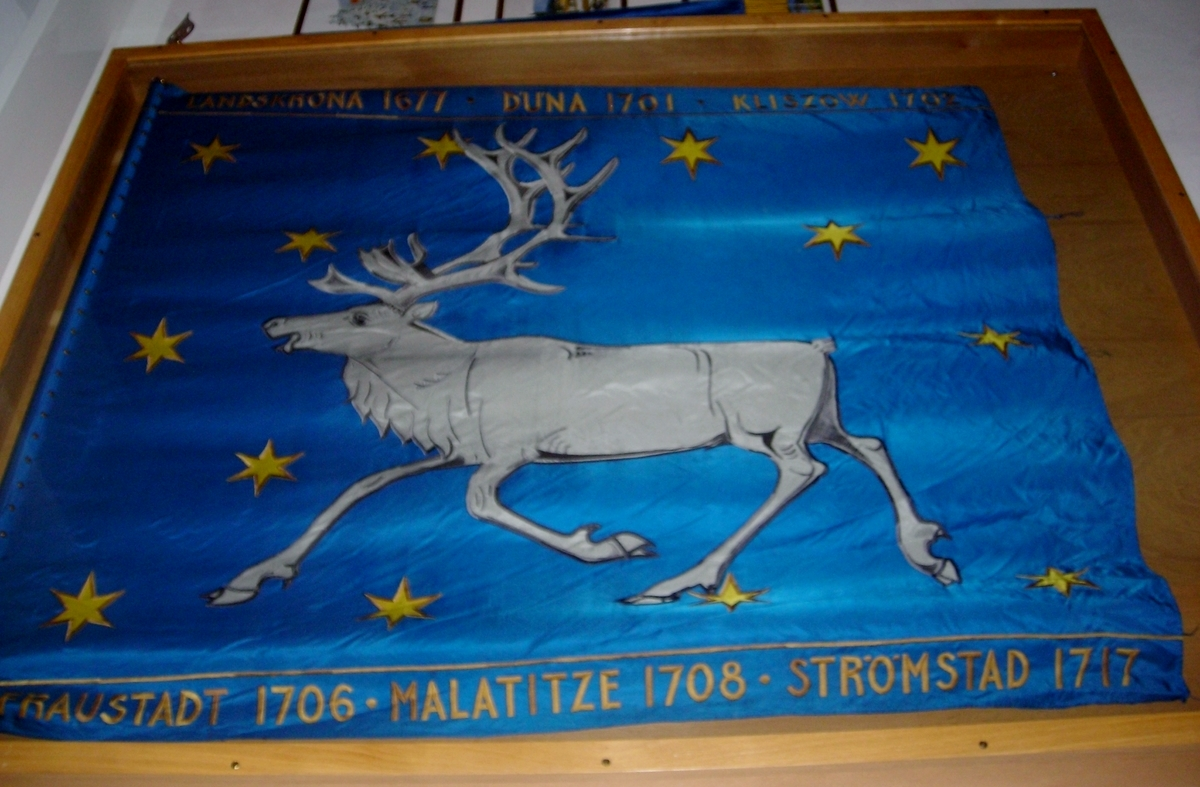
Copy of the 1947 colour of Norrbotten Regiment.

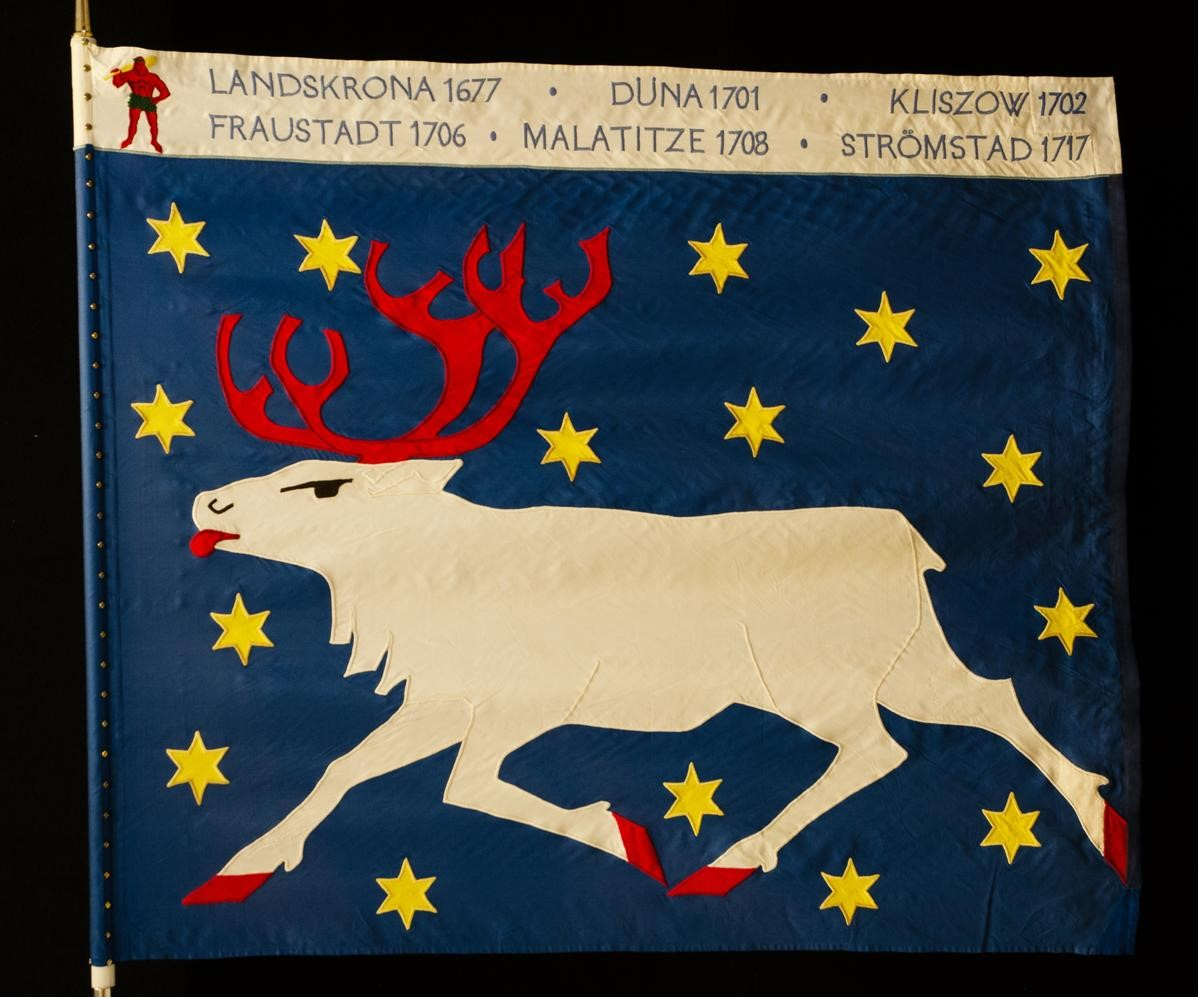
2001 colour, Norrbotten Regiment.

=== Coat of arms ===
The coat of the arms of the Norrbotten Regiment (I 19) 1977–1994. Blazon: "Azure, powdered with estoiles or, the provincial badge of Västerbotten, a reindeer courant argent, armed and langued gules. The shield surmounted two muskets in saltire or." The coat of arms of the Norrbotten Armoured Battalion (P 5) 1957–1975 and the Norrbotten Regiment and Norrbotten Brigade (NMekB 19) 1994–2000. Blazon: "Azure, powdered with estoiles or, the provincial badge of Västerbotten, a reindeer courant argent, armed and langued gules. The shield surmounted two arms in fess, embowed and vambraced, the hands holding swords in saltire, or". The coat of the arms of the Norrbotten Regiment (I 19) since 2000. Blazon: "Azure, powdered with estoiles or, the provincial badge of Västerbotten, a reindeer courant argent, armed gules".

Coat of arms of the Norrbotten Regiment (I 19) 1977–1994.

Coat of the arms of the Norrbotten Armoured Battalion (P 5) 1957–1975 and the Norrbotten Regiment and Norrbotten Brigade (NMekB 19) 1994–2000.

Coat of arms of the Norrbotten Regiment (I 19) 2000–present.

=== Medals ===
In 1967, the Norrbottens regementes (I 19) förtjänstmedalj ("Norrbotten Regiment (I 19) Medal of Merit") in gold/silver/bronze (NorrbregGM/SM/BM) of the 8th size was established. The medal ribbon is of blue moiré with a yellow stripe on the middle followed on each side by a black line and a white stripe.

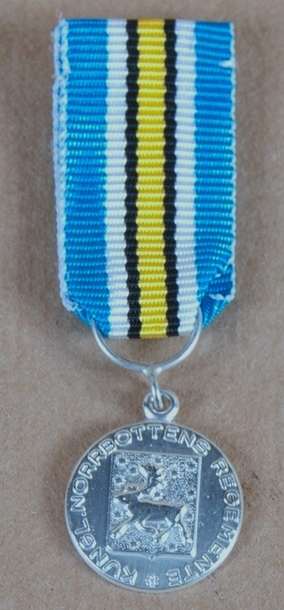
Norrbotten Regiment (I 19) Medal of Merit in silver (miniature medal).

Ribbon bar of the Norrbotten Regiment (I 19) Medal of Merit

=== Other ===
When the Lapland Brigade (Lapplandsbrigaden, NB 20) was disbanded on 31 December 1997, Norrbotten Regiment took over its traditions and colour, which should not be mixed with the colour and traditions of Västerbotten Regiment, which were transferred on 1 July 2000 to the Västerbotten Group (Västerbottensgruppen). In addition to the traditional heritage of the Lapland Brigade, the regiment also has primarily traditional heritage from Norrbotten Regiment with Norrbotten Armoured Battalion (I 19/P 5), Norrbotten Regiment and Norrbotten Brigade (MekB 19), Norrbotten Armoured Battalion (P 5) and Norrland Dragoon Regiment (K 4).

== Commanding officers ==
Regimental commanders active from 1900. For regimental commanders active from 1994 to 2000, see Norrbotten Regiment and Norrbotten Brigade

=== Commanders ===
- 1899–1904: Axel Otto Fredrik von Arbin
- 1904–1907: Colonel Lars Tingsten
- 1907–1908: Constantin Fallenius
- 1908–1911: Carl Greger Leijonhufvud
- 1911–1916: Conrad August Falkenberg
- 1916–1921: Gabriel Hedenberg
- 1921–1924: Erik Nordenskjöld
- 1924–1927: Erik Grafström
- 1928–1934: Colonel Ivar Holmquist
- 1934–1937: Gustaf Adolf Miles Mauritz Hahr
- 1937–1942: Sven Ramström
- 1942–1946: Colonel Nils Björk
- 1946–1947: Colonel Nils Swedlund
- 1947–1951: Lars Petrus Lande
- 1951–1958: Arne G:son Hallström
- 1958–1961: Colonel Karl Gustaf Brandberg
- 1961–1963: Olof Rudqvist
- 1963–1965: Seth Kristian Andrae
- 1965–1966: Colonel Karl Eric Holm
- 1966–1971: Bror Bertil Matteus Jansson
- 1971–1973: Ingemar Grunditz
- 1973–1984: Jan Wickbom
- 1984–1986: Colonel Sven-Åke Jansson
- 1986–1988: Bo Pellnäs
- 1988–1993: Göran Honkamaa
- 1994–2000: See Norrbotten Regiment and Norrbotten Brigade
- 2000–2003: Per Lodin
- 2003–2004: Ola Hansson
- 2004–2006: Frank Westman
- 2006–2010: Jan Mörtberg
- 2010–2014: Olof Granander
- 2014–2017: Mikael Frisell
- 2018–2018: Ulf Siverstedt
- 2018–2021: Jonny Lindfors
- 2021–2025: Nils Johansson
- 2025–present: Mats Ludvig

=== Deputy commanders ===
- 1973–1976: Ulf Ling-Vannérus

== Names, designations and locations ==
| Name | Translation | From | | To |
|---|---|---|---|---|
| Kungl. Norrbottens fältjägarkår | Royal Norrbotten Ranger Corps | 1841-??-?? | – | 1892-12-11 |
| Kungl. Norrbottens regemente | Royal Norrbotten Regiment | 1892-12-12 | – | 1974-12-31 |
| Norrbottens regemente | Norrbotten Regiment | 1975-01-01 | – | 1975-06-30 |
| Norrbottens regemente med Norrbottens pansarbataljon | Norrbotten Regiment with Norrbotten Armoured Battalion | 1975-07-01 | – | 1994-06-30 |
| Norrbottens regemente | Norrbotten Regiment | 2000-07-01 | – | |
| Designation | | From | | To |
| No. 19 | | 1841-??-?? | – | 1914-09-30 |
| I 19 | | 1914-10-01 | – | 1975-06-30 |
| I 19/P 5 | | 1975-07-01 | – | 1994-06-30 |
| I 19 | | 2000-07-01 | – | |
| Location | | From | | To |
| Pitholms hed | | 1841-??-?? | – | 1907-09-30 |
| Näsby hed | | 1841-??-?? | – | 1907-09-30 |
| Notvikens lägerplats | | 1883-05-02 | – | 1907-09-30 |
| Boden garrison | | 1907-10-01 | – | |

== See also ==
- List of Swedish regiments
