= Boden Garrison =

- Bodens garnison
- Boden, Norrbotten in Sweden
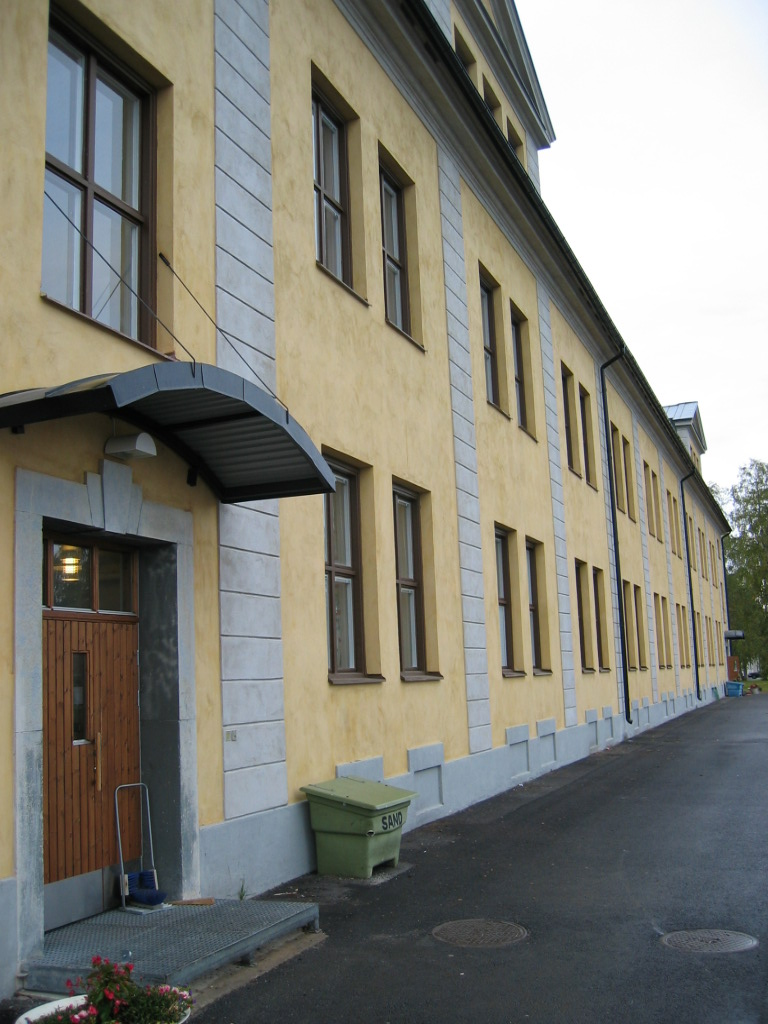
- Barracks housing conscripts of Norrbotten Regiment, part of Boden Garrison.

Site information
- Type: Garrison
- Owner: Swedish Fortifications Agency
- Operator: Swedish Armed Forces

Location
- Boden Garrison shown within Norrbotten county
- Coordinates: 65.83°N 21.69°E

Boden Garrison (Swedish: Bodens garnison) is a major garrison in Sweden, located in and around Boden in Norrbotten County. The garrison has during the 20th century been, and still is, the largest garrison in Sweden, consisting of several units of the Swedish Armed Forces as well as Boden Fortress.

== History ==
Before the decision to construct Boden Fortress, there was no permanently stationed military unit in Boden. The main military presence were the four tenement soldiers of Bodens kompani (Boden Company)—part of Norrbotten Regiment (I 19)—that lived in the locality. To provide men for the fortress, several units were either created in, or moved to the newly built garrison. The first unit garrisoned in Boden was Boden Engineer Corps, and engineering battalion, in 1905 (even though the official move was not made until in 1908). Soon to follow were infantry and artillery units that had wartime stationing in and around the fortress, and other supporting units.

From 1910 and on, the garrison was developed from a pure fortress garrison to a training centre for troops serving in the whole of upper Norrland. More than 60 percent of Norrbotten Regiment were to be used for the field army in case of mobilisation right before the First World War. On 1 January 1914, 709 permanently employed soldiers and officers were stationed in Boden, and 4,710 conscripts were trained in the garrison during the year, this in a locality with a population of 4,952.

During the Second World War, the mission of Norrbotten Regiment changed from manning the fortress to guarding the northern borders, and the infantry unit supposed to protect the fortress was instead Värmland Regiment that would be transported from southwestern Sweden up to Boden in case of mobilisation. A further move from fortress garrison was taken in 1957 when the armoured unit Norrbotten Armoured Battalion was created. The first air unit was stationed in Boden already in 1916, when a small detachment of three aircraft and 29 personnel was moved there from the army air force station in Malmslätt. During the years, further detachments were located in Boden garrison from time to time, but it was not until 1959 that Boden got its own flying unit, through the helicopter unit Arméns helikopterskola.

The massive cutdowns of the Swedish Armed Forces in the 1990s and 2000s saw several old regiments disband, merge, or move, which affected Boden as well. Several independent regiments and battalions stationed in the garrison were reduced in size and merged into Norrbotten Regiment. Even after the cutdowns, Boden Garrison retained the position as the largest garrison in Sweden and the main training centre for conscripts. The garrison houses the only remaining artillery regiment of the armed forces and is the only remaining garrison housing more than one Swedish Army regiment.

Conscripts and personnel of Boden Garrison 1920–2007
Year	Personnel	Conscripts
1920	931	5,047
1930	772	6,191
1939	—	5,669
1940	889	—
1950	981	1,810
1960	768	2,407
1970	899	3,250
1980	1,480	2,000
2006/07	—	1,800

== Units ==
Name	Designation	Type	From	To	Notes
Northern Military Region	MR N	Command	2013-01-01		
Artillery Regiment	A 9	Artillery regiment	2006-01-01		
Norrbottensgruppen	G 63	Command	2000-07-01		
Norrbotten Regiment	I 19	Armoured regiment	2000-07-01		
Norrbotten Armoured Battalion	Pbat/I 19	Armoured battalion	2000-07-01		
Norrland Engineer Company	Ingkomp/I 19	Engineer company	2006-01-01	2011-06-21	
Norrland Artillery Battalion	Artbat/I 19	Artillery battalion	2000-07-01	2005-12-31	
Norrland Engineer Battalion	Ingbat/I 19	Engineer battalion	2000-07-01	2005-12-31	
Norrland Signal Battalion	Signbat/I 19	Communications regiment	2000-07-01	2005-12-31	
Norrland Anti-Aircraft Battalion	Lvbat/I 19	Air defence battalion	2000-07-01	2005-06-30	
Norrlands helikopterskvadron	1. hkpskv	Helicopter squadron	2000-07-01	2005-06-30	
Norrbottens försvarsområde	Fo 63	Command	1998-01-01	2000-06-30	
Norrland Artillery Regiment	A 8	Artillery regiment	1998-01-01	2000-06-30	
Norrlands helikopterbataljon	1. hkpbat	Helicopter battalion	1998-07-01	2000-06-30	
Norrland Engineer Corps	Ing 3	Engineer battalion	1994-07-01	2000-06-30	
Norrland Anti-Aircraft Corps	Lv 7	Air defence battalion	1994-07-01	2000-06-30	
Norrbotten Regiment and Norrbotten Brigade	MekB 19	Mechanised regiment/brigade	1994-10-01	2000-06-30	
Norrland Signal Corps	S 3	Communications regiment	1994-07-01	2000-06-30	
Norrbottens arméflygbataljon	AF 1	Helicopter battalion	1980-01-01	1998-06-30	
Bodens försvarsområde	Fo 63	Command	1994-07-01	1997-12-31	
Boden Artillery Regiment	A 8	Artillery regiment	1994-07-01	1997-12-31	
Luleå Anti-Aircraft Regiment	Lv 7	Air defence regiment	1992-05-01	1994-06-30	
Norrland Signal Regiment	S 3	Communications regiment	1987-07-01	1994-06-30	
Norrbotten Regiment and Norrbotten Armoured Battalion	I 19/P 5	Infantry/armoured battalion	1975-07-01	1994-06-30	
Boden Artillery Regiment	A 8/Fo 63	Artillery regiment	1975-07-01	1994-06-30	
Boden Engineer Regiment	Ing 3	Engineer regiment	1975-07-01	1994-06-30	
Norrland Signal Battalion	S 3	Communications battalion	1957-04-01	1987-06-30	
Arméns helikopterskola	HkpS	Helicopter school	1959-11-01	1979-12-31	
Norrbotten Armoured Battalion	P 5	Armoured battalion	1957-04-01	1975-06-30	
Bodens försvarsområde	Fo 63	Command	1942-10-01	1975-06-30	
Boden Engineer Corps	Ing 3	Engineer battalion	1937-07-01	1975-06-30	
Boden Artillery Regiment	A 8	Artillery regiment	1919-09-10	1975-06-30	
Norrbotten Regiment	I 19	Infantry regiment	1907-10-01	1975-06-30	
Signal Battalion in Boden	S 3	Communications battalion	1955-12-07	1957-03-31	
Signal Battalion in Boden	S 1 B	Communications battalion	1954-07-01	1955-12-06	
Signal Regiment's Company in Boden	S 1 B	Communications company	1942-12-04	1954-06-30	
Norrbotten Artillery Corps	A 5	Artillery battalion	1928-01-01	1951-06-30	
Tredje intendenturkompaniet	Int 3	Support company	1928-01-01	1950-12-31	
Boden Signal Company	S 1 B	Communications company	1937-07-01	1942-12-03	
Boden Engineer Corps	Ing 4	Engineer battalion	1905-04-01	1937-06-30	
Intendenturkompaniet i Boden	Int 3	Support company	1915-10-29	1927-12-31	
III. division/Norrland Artillery Regiment	A 4 B	Artillery battalion	1910-04-01	1927-12-31	
Field Telegraph Corps' Detachment in Boden	Ing 4 det	Communications detachment	1915-01-01	1925-10-31	
Boden Artillery Battalion	A 8 B	Artillery battalion	1912-11-01	1919-09-09	
2nd Battalion/Boden-Karlsborg Artillery Regiment	A 8 B	Artillery battalion	1906-10-24	1912-10-31	

== Commanders ==
As the garrison only became an actual organisation in the armed forces in 1975, there was no official garrison commander until then, however the commandants of Boden Fortress had extended powers over the military units stationed in the garrison. The position Commander Boden Garrison (Chef Bodens garnison) has since been occupied by:

Name	From	To
Sven Skeppstedt	1975-07-01	1980-03-31
Reinhold Lahti	1980-04-01	1983-03-31
Thure Wadenholt	1983-04-01	1992-12-31
Göran Honkamaa	1993-01-01	1999-09-30
Ulf Nordlander	1999-10-01	2000-06-30
Per Lodin	2000	2003
Ola Hansson	2003	2004
Frank Westman	2004	2006
Jan Mörtberg	2006	2010
Olof Granander	2010	
