= Norrbotten Artillery Corps =

- Norrbottens artillerikår
- Active: 1928–1951
- Country: Sweden
- Allegiance: Swedish Armed Forces
- Branch: Swedish Army
- Type: Artillery
- Size: Corps
- Part of: Upper Norrland Troops (1928–1942); VI Military District (1942–1951)
- Garrison/HQ: Boden
- Patron: Saint Barbara
- Colors: Dark red
- March: "Artilleri V" (Ström) (Note: The march was inherited from Uppland Artillery Regiment. In 1952, the march was taken over by the Bergslagen Artillery Regiment, and in 2000 by the Artillery Regiment.)
- Anniversaries: 4 December (Note: 4 December is saint day of Saint Barbara.)

Insignia
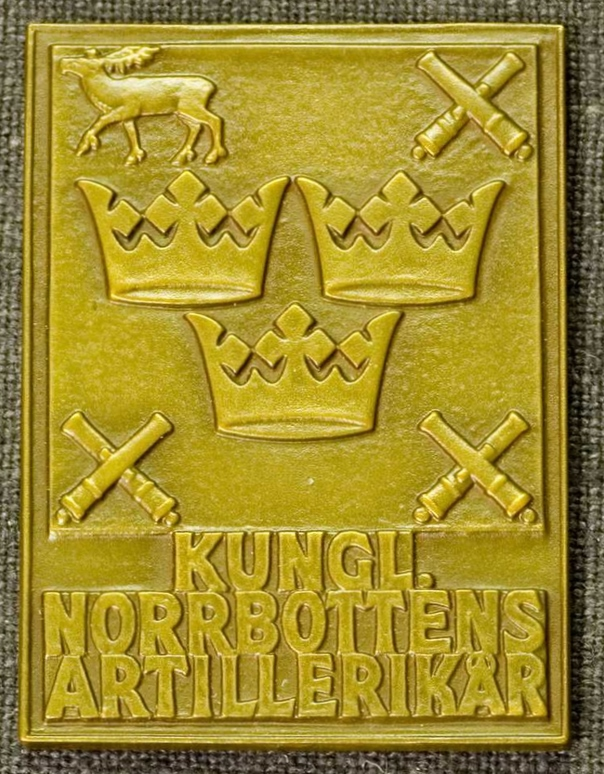
- Commemorative plaquette

Norrbotten Artillery Corps (Swedish: Norrbottens artillerikår), designation A 5, was a Swedish Army artillery unit which operated between 1928 and 1951. The unit was based in Boden Garrison in Boden, Sweden.

== History ==
On 1 April 1910, the Norrbotten Artillery Regiment's Detachment in Boden (A 4 B) was raised, and on 6 June 1910, the detachment was placed to Boden. The detachment consisted of III (Artillery) Division of Norrland Artillery Regiment (A 4). Through the Defence Act of 1925, it was decided to separate the division from Norrland Artillery Regiment (A 4), to form an independent unit. On 31 December 1927, the detachment was disbanded, and on 1 January 1928, the Norrbotten Artillery Corps (A 5) was raised as a horse field artillery corps.

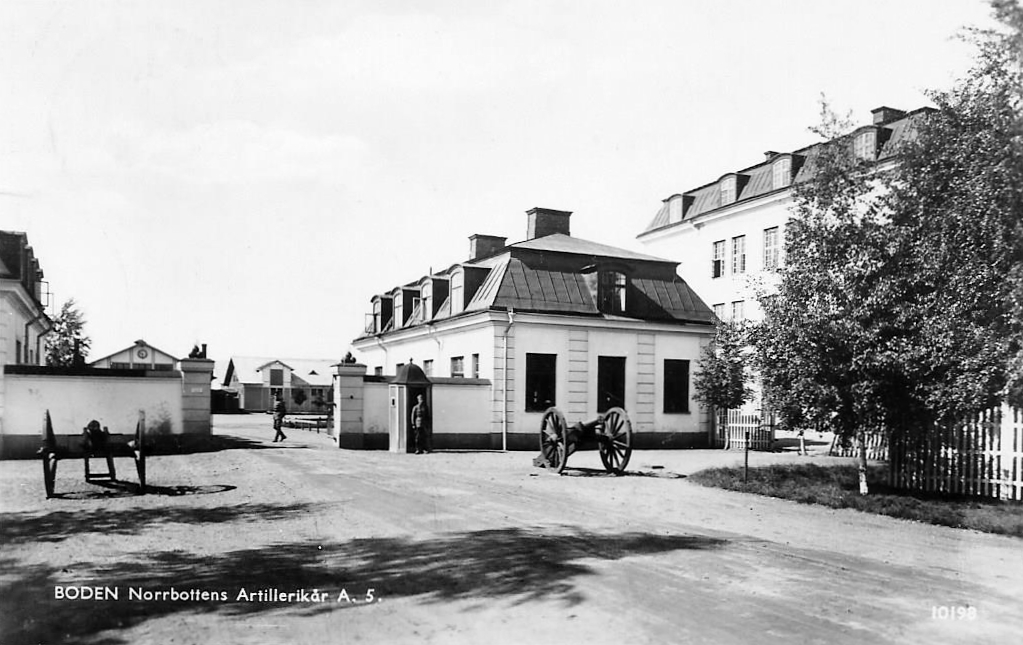
Guardhouse of the Norrbotten Artillery Corps, in 1928.

After World War II, the idea was that the Swedish defense would be disarmed. Prior to the Defence Act of 1948, it appeared in the 1945 report of the Defence Committee, that it proposed, among other things, that Norrbotten Artillery Corps (A 5) would be amalgamated with Boden Artillery Regiment (A 8). Instead of a cooling down of the security policy situation in Europe after the war, a new security policy was initiated through the Cold War, which can be said to be initiated by the 1948 Czechoslovak coup d'état. This prompted the Minister of Defence to instead advocate a strengthening of the defence. In December 1947, the Defence Committee's proposal fell and instead it was decided on a reinforcement. However, the Riksdag adopted the Defence Committee's proposal, which in practice meant that Norrbotten Artillery Corps was amalgamated into Boden Artillery Regiment.

In 1951, the Swedish government proposed to the Riksdag a restriction of the Swedish Army's peace organization, which meant that Norrbotten Artillery Corps (A 5), the Scanian Cavalry Regiment (Skånska kavalleriregementet, K 5), the Göta Train Regiment in Norea (Göta trängregementes kompani i Nora, T 2 N) and the Öresund Naval District (Öresunds marindistrikt, MDÖ) would be disbanded. The government's proposal was adopted by the Riksdag, and thus the Norrbotten Artillery Corps would be disbanded as a separate peace unit during the financial year 1951/1952, so that during the same financial year, it would be amalgamated into Boden Artillery Regiment. On 28 April 1951, a disbandment ceremony for the corps was held, which was disbanded officially on 30 June 1951. However, the artillery division remained at the eastern barracks on Sveavägen until 1954, when it was also geographically transferred to Boden's Artillery Regiment at Åbergsleden.

== Barracks and training areas ==
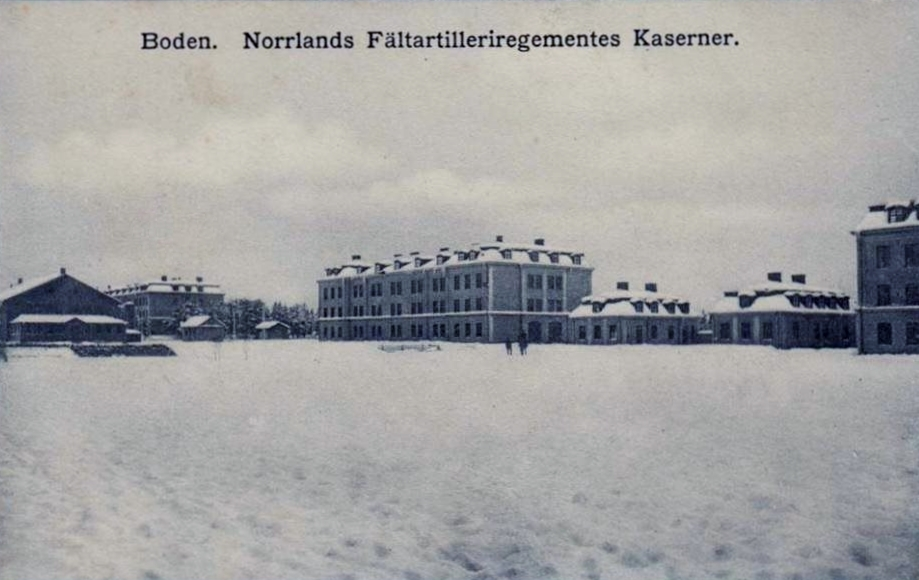
Barracks of the Norrbotten Artillery Corps. Picture from 1910s.

The Norrland Artillery Regiment's Detachment was placed in the barracks area along Sveavägen, which was originally planned for the Norrbotten Cavalry Corps (Norrbottens kavallerikår, K 9). During the years 1928–1940, the barracks area was shared with the 3rd Squadron of Norrland Dragoon Regiment (K 4), which were located in the western barracks. On 19 July 1940, the barracks were taken over by Boden Signal Company (S 1 B), which were located there until 31 October 1945. After the disbandment of the corps, and when the artillery division left the area, the barracks area was taken over entirely by the Signal Battalion in Boden (S 3). From 31 August 2005, the Artillery Regiment (A 9) is located in the barracks area.

== Heraldry and traditions ==
=== Colours, standards and guidons ===
On 16 June 1, 1938, His Majesty the King Gustaf V presented a standard Norrbotten Artillery Corps. From 1 July 1951, the traditions and the standard of the corps were carried on and by the Boden Artillery Regiment (A 8). From 1 July 2000, the standard and traditions were passed on to the Norrland Artillery Battalion (Artbat/I 19). Since 1 January 2006, there is no unit specifically for the unit's standard or traditions.

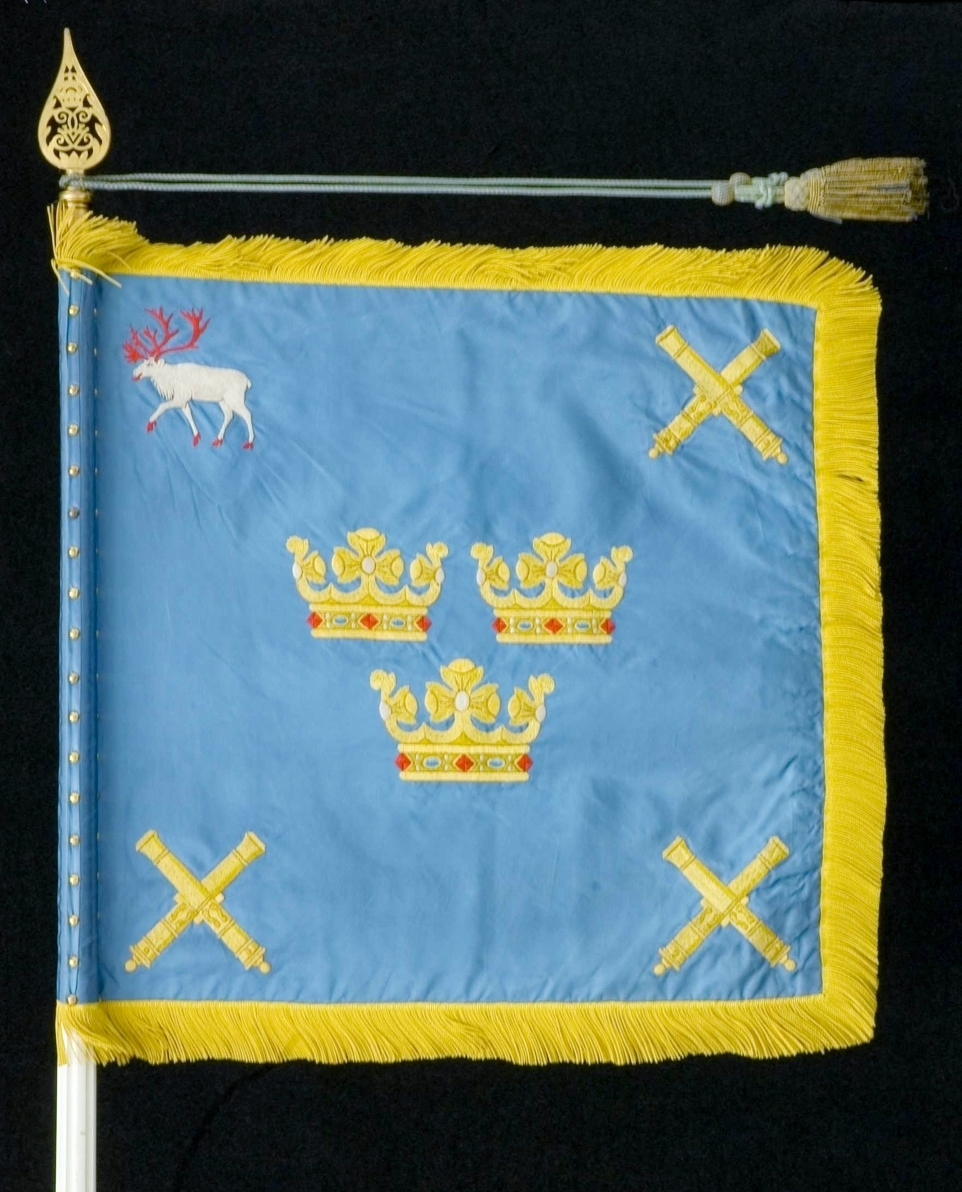
Standard of the Norrbotten Artillery Corps (A 5)

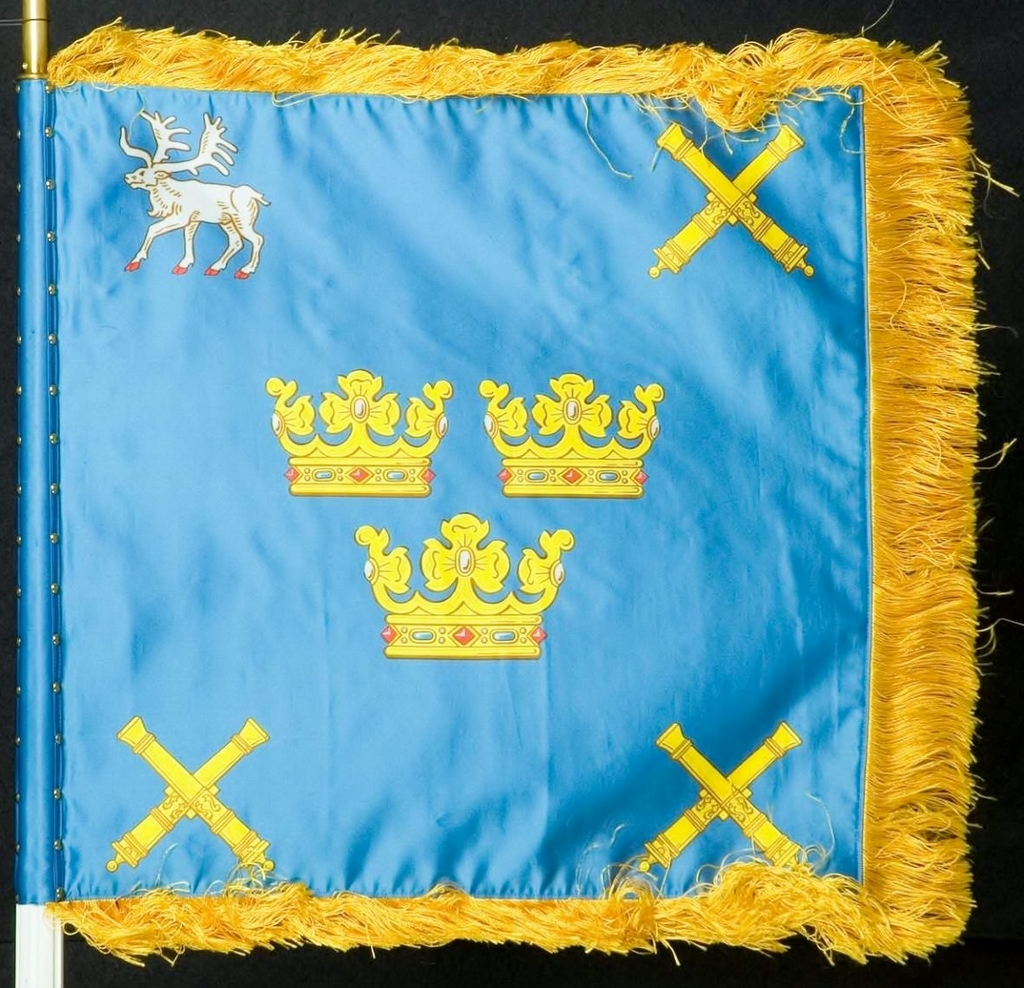
Guard standard of the Norrbotten Artillery Corps (A 5)

=== Other ===
When the corps was raised on 1 January 1928, it took over the designation from the disbanded Uppland Artillery Regiment (A 5). The corps also took over the regimental march, "Artillery V", also known as "Artillerimarsch" (G. Ström) and the color of the regiment, dark red. When the corps was disbanded and amalgamated into Boden Artillery Regiment (A 8), the Bergslagen Artillery Regiment (A 9) took over march of Norrbotten Artillery Corps. It was adopted on 1 July 2000 by the Artillery Regiment (A 9).

== Commanding officers ==
Commanding officers from 1928 to 1951.

- 1928–1931: Per Falk
- 1931–1937: Samuel Åkerhielm
- 1937–1940: August O. L. Rehnberg
- 1940–1942: Sven Salander
- 1942–1943: Fernando Odenrick
- 1943–1946: Stig Tarras-Wahlberg
- 1946–1951: Gösta Jörlin

== Names, designations and locations ==
Name	Translation	From		To
Kungl. Norrlands artilleriregementes detachement i Boden	Royal Norrbotten Artillery Regiment's Detachment in Boden	1910-04-10	–	1927-12-31
Kungl. Norrbottens artillerikår	Royal Norrbotten Artillery Corps	1928-01-01	–	1951-06-30
Designation		From		To
A 4 B		1910-04-01	–	1927-12-31
A 5		1928-01-01	–	1951-06-30
Location		From		To
Boden Garrison		1910-06-06	–	1951-06-30

== See also ==
- List of Swedish artillery regiments
