= Battle of Strömstad =

Battle of the Great Northern War

- Part of the Great Northern War
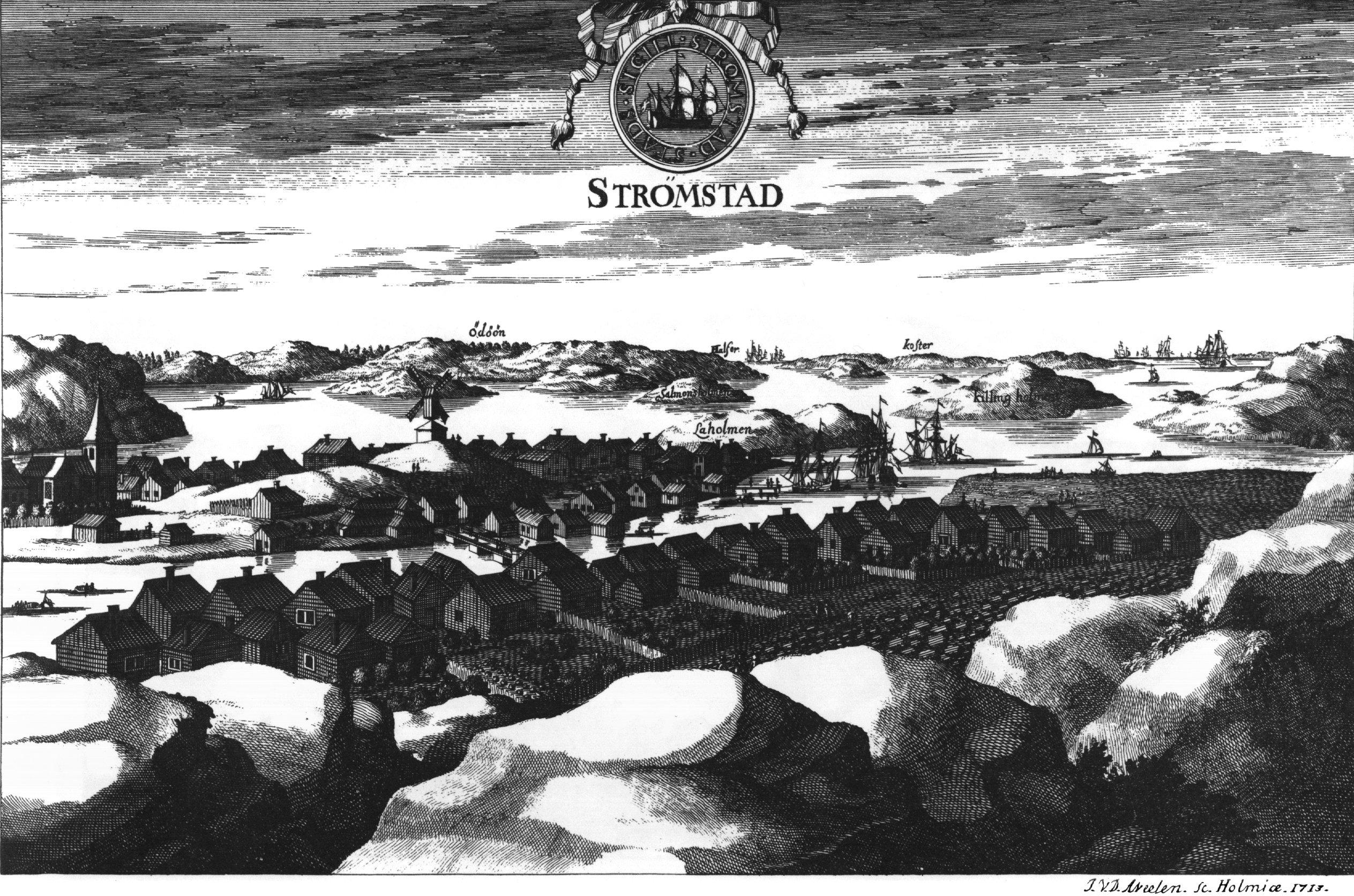
- Strömstad in the beginning of the 18th century
Date	8 July 1717 (O.S.); 19 July 1717 (N.S.)
Location	Strömstad, Sweden 58°56′N 11°11′E
Result	Swedish victory

Belligerents
Swedish Empire	Denmark–Norway

Commanders and leaders
Johan Giertta	Peder Tordenskjold

Strength
1,800 men	Around 4,000 men 3 ships of the line 2 prams 9 galleys 20 landing craft

Casualties and losses
19 killed 173 wounded	96 killed 246 wounded

The Battle of Strömstad took place on 19 July 1717 (N.S.) at Strömstad during the Great Northern War. The Swedish army of about 1,800 men under the command of Johan Giertta defeated the Danish fleet of several larger vessels and perhaps 4,000 men under Peder Tordenskjold. Peter tried to destroy the stocks of supplies Sweden had gathered for the upcoming invasion of Norway. In the battle about 200 Swedes were either dead or wounded and about 350 Norwegians.

== Battle ==
On the night of 19 July, the Norwegian ships were thrown towards Strömstad harbor, where they anchored up at 4 o'clock in the morning and began shelling the harbor fortifications. The liner ships concentrated on Laholmen and the barges on the other batteries. After a few hours of artillery preparation, six galleries were sent in to disembark on Laholmen. However, the defense was not defeated and only two galleys managed to be placed on the beach, where they could be damaged by Swedish infantry. Tordenskjold himself was wounded in the leg and the Norwegians were forced to withdraw with a loss of 350 men. The Swedish losses should have been considerably smaller.

== Aftermath ==
The Swedes managed to defend their connecting lines for the army's operations in Norway. After the two unsuccessful attacks on Gothenburg and Strömstad in 1717, Tordenskjold was deprived of command of the Danish navy in the Kattegat for 1718 and subjected to the Schoutby night Rosenpalm.

The successful defense of Gothenburg and Strömstad again strengthened the Swedes' confidence after the previous defeats. The Danish North Sea Squadron henceforth remained more in the shadows and limited its operations to purely defensive companies. Swedish ships could soon go undisturbed between Gothenburg and Strömstad, at least if they had coverage.
