= Karl Engelbrektson =

Swedish Army officer

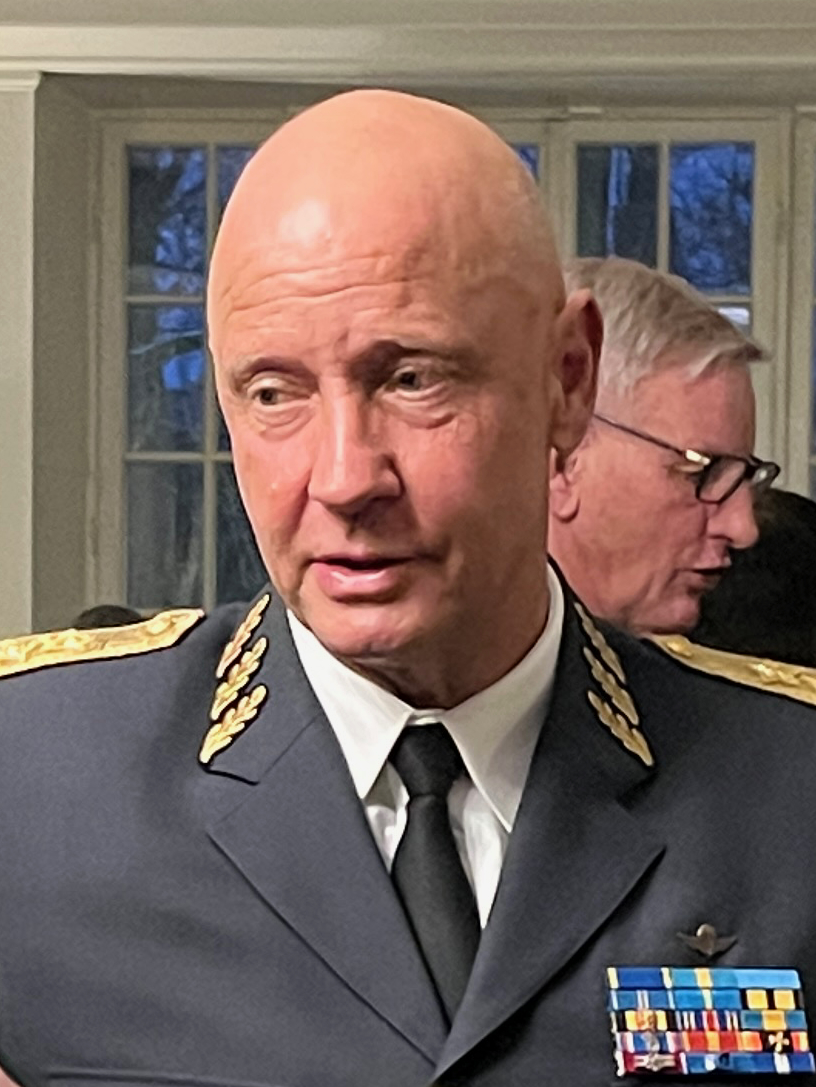
- Engelbrektson in 2023.
- Born: Karl Lorentz Engelbrekt Engelbrektson; 2 February 1962 (age 64); Falkenberg, Sweden
- Military career
- Allegiance: Sweden
- Branch: Swedish Army
- Service years: 1981–2023
- Rank: Major General
- Units: Bohuslän Regiment (1981-91); Värmland Regiment (1991-96)
- Commands: Nordic Battlegroup; Assistant Chief of Armed Forces Training & Procurement; Chief of Army
- Conflicts: 2004 unrest in Kosovo

Major General Karl Lorentz Engelbrekt Engelbrektson (born 12 February 1962) is a retired Swedish Army officer. He completed the Advanced Course at the Swedish Armed Forces Staff College in 1988 and later joined the Värmland Regiment, where he rose to the rank of major. He furthered his education at the Swedish National Defence College and worked on arms control issues at the Ministry of Defence.

Engelbrektson organized a joint training section within the Swedish Armed Forces Headquarters from 1998 to 1999 and attended the Geneva Centre for Security Policy. He held various leadership positions, including deputy brigade commander and commander of the 9th Swedish battalion in Kosovo. He also served in the German EU Force Headquarters.

In 2005, he became the Force Commander of the Nordic Battlegroup and held several important roles in military education and leadership. He served as Chief of Army from June 2016 to June 2023 before retiring in June 2023, succeeded by Major General Jonny Lindfors.

== Early life ==
Engelbrektson was born on 12 February 1962 in Falkenberg, Sweden, the son of Olle Engelbrektson and his wife Anneli. He grew up in Hunnebostrand. Engelbrektson attended Gullmarsskolan in Lysekil Municipality from 1979 to 1981 and then did his military service at Bohuslän Regiment (I 17) in 1981. Engelbrektson attended the Swedish Infantry Officers' College from 1982 to 1984 when he was commissioned as an officer with the rank of second lieutenant.

== Career ==
After becoming an officer, he returned to his old regiment. In 1985 his left hand was severely injured in an accident involving explosives. He passed the Advanced Course at the Swedish Armed Forces Staff College from 1987 to 1988 and in connection with the disbandment of Bohuslän Regiment in 1991, Engelbrektson transferred to Värmland Regiment (I 2) where he later was promoted to major. Engelbrektson passed the Staff Course at the Swedish National Defence College from 1991 to 1992 and attended the same college from 1994 to 1996. He then served at the Swedish Military Intelligence and Security Service and then the Ministry of Defence with arms control issues and became the first desk officer for European Union (EU) military co-operation.

From 1998 to 1999, Engelbrektson organized a new joint training section within the Swedish Armed Forces Headquarters. He attended the Geneva Centre for Security Policy focusing on International Relations and Conflict Management from 1999 to 2000. He was then tasked to organize and lead a new international manning section within the Swedish Armed Forces Headquarters. In 2001, Engelbrektson was appointed deputy brigade commander of Gotland Regiment (P 18) and from December 2003 until June 2004 he was commander of the 9th Swedish battalion (KS09), part of Kosovo Force (KFOR), in Kosovo, where he experienced the mid-March fights in Čaglavica. He also served as deputy commander in the German EU Force Headquarters (FHQ) in Ulm, Germany. In June 2004, he was appointed acting commanding officer of Gotland Military District (MDG), a position he held until January 2005 when he was appointed Force Commander of the Nordic Battlegroup (NBG). Engelbrektson left that position in July 2008.

During this time, he also passed the Senior Course in National Security at the Swedish National Defence College from 2004 to 2006. From 2009 to 2010, Engelbrektson did the Strategic Leadership and International Relations Course at the Royal College of Defence Studies in United Kingdom and from January 2010 until August 2010 he served as Military Advisor, European Union and NATO Policy at the Ministry of Defence in Stockholm. From September 2010 he served as Sweden's Military Representative to the EU and NATO in the Permanent Representation of Sweden to the European Union. From 2013 to 2014, Engelbrektson was chairman of the NATO Connecting Forces Initiative, Task Force; negotiating new partnerships on behalf of seven nations in view of the 2014 Wales summit. Engelbrektson served as Assistant Chief of Armed Forces Training & Procurement from 2014 to 2016 before being appointed Chief of Army starting from 1 June 2016. His appointment was prolonged from 1 January 2021 to 28 February 2023. On 1 January 2023, his appointment was prolonged again to 30 June 2023. He was succeeded by Major General Jonny Lindfors on 18 June 2023. Engelbrektson was placed at the disposal of the Chief of the Defence Staff from 18 June to 30 June 2023 when he retired.

== Personal life ==
Engelbrektson is married to Sofi and they have two children.

== Dates of rank ==
- 1984 – Second lieutenant
- 19?? – Lieutenant
- 19?? – Captain
- 1998 – Major
- 2000 – Lieutenant colonel
- 2003 – Colonel
- 2006 – Brigadier general
- 2014 – Major general

== Awards and decorations ==
=== Swedish ===
- (Sweden) For Zealous and Devoted Service of the Realm
- (Sweden) Swedish Armed Forces Conscript Medal
- (Sweden) Swedish Armed Forces International Service Medal
- (Sweden) Älvsborg Group Medal of Merit (Älvsborgsgruppens förtjänstmedalj)
- (Sweden) Home Guard Silver Medal
- (Sweden) Värmland Regiment and Värmland Brigade Commemorative Medal (Värmlands regementes och Värmlandsbrigadens minnesmedalj, VärmlregbrigMSM)
- (Sweden) Eastern Army Division Commemorative Medal (Östra arméfördelningens minnesmedalj, ÖFördSMM)
- (Sweden) Gotland Regiment Commemorative Medal (Gotlands regementes minnesmedalj, GotlregMSM)
- (Sweden) Swedish Federation for Voluntary Defence Education and Training Merit Badge (2017)
- (Sweden) Land Warfare Centre Medal of Merit in gold (Markstridsskolans förtjänstmedalj i guld) (March 2023)

=== Foreign ===
- (France) Commander of the Ordre national du Mérite (14 June 2022)
- (France) Officer of the Ordre national du Mérite (January 2012)
- (United States) Commander of the Legion of Merit (19 December 2022)
- (Germany) Badge of Honour of the Bundeswehr, Cross of Honour in gold (15 November 2022)
- NATO Medal for Kosovo (2004)
- (Finland) Finnish Military Medal of Merit (2 September 2021)

== Honours ==
- Member of the Royal Swedish Academy of War Sciences (2006)
- Senior Fellow of New Westminster College, New Westminster, Canada (2013)
- Member of the Swedish Institute for International Affairs (2015)
- Grand Master of the Order of Innocence (Innocenceorden) (14 April 2016)

Military offices
Preceded by ?	Sweden's Military Representative to the EU and NATO; 2010–2013	Succeeded by Odd Werin
Preceded by Bengt Svensson	Assistant Chief of Armed Forces Training & Procurement; 2014–2016	Succeeded by Anders Callert
Preceded by Anders Brännström	Chief of Army; 2016–2023	Succeeded by Jonny Lindfors
