= Anders Callert =

Swedish Major General (born 1965)

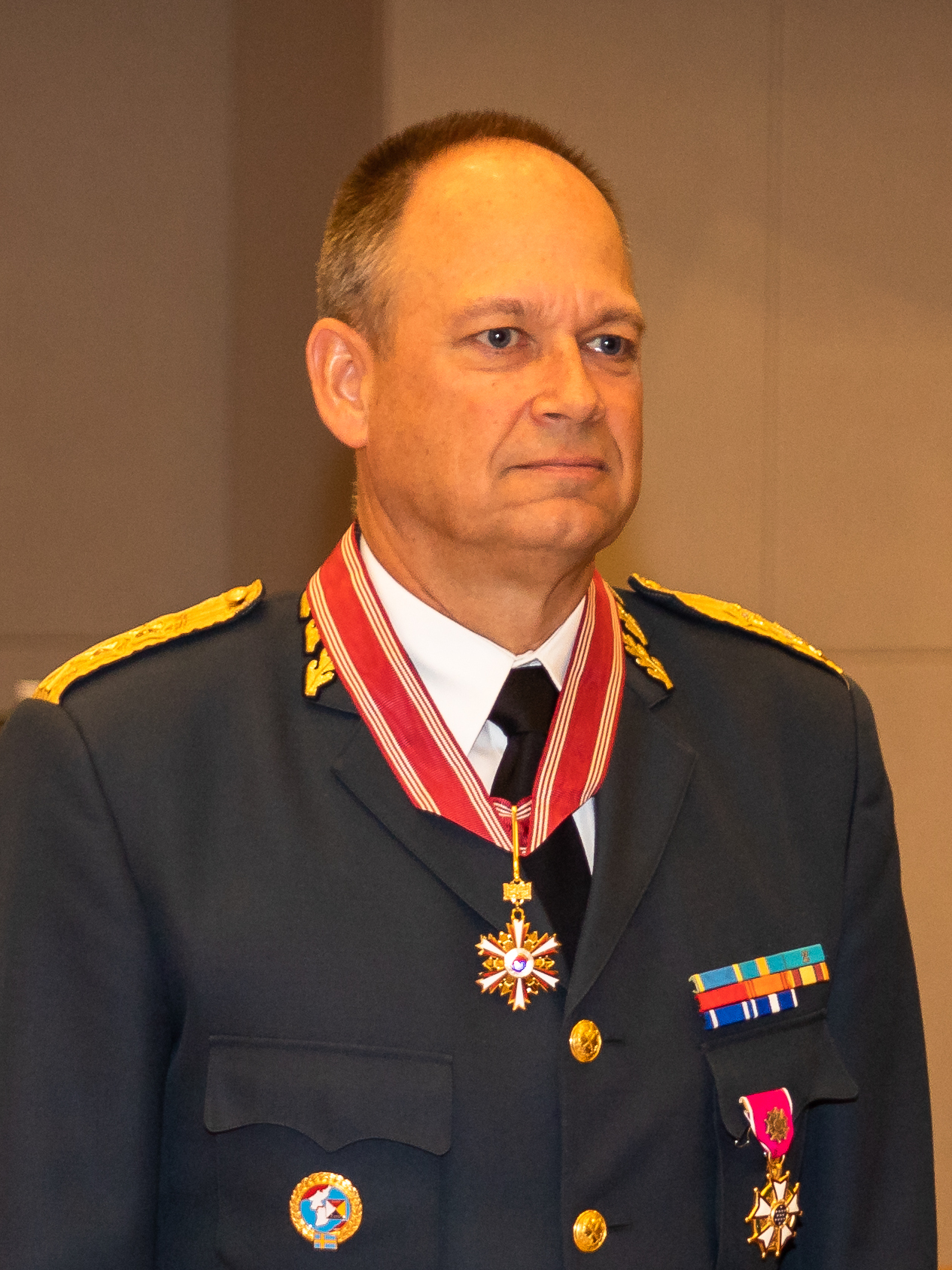
- Born: Anders Bertil Callert; 10 May 1965 (age 61); Österhaninge, Sweden
- Military career
- Allegiance: Sweden
- Branch: Swedish Army
- Service years: 1988–present
- Rank: Major General
- Commands: Norrland Artillery Battalion; Artillery Combat School; Artillery Regiment; Assistant Chief of Armed Forces Training & Procurement; NNSC; Deputy Vice-Chancellor, Defence University
- Conflicts: Post-Bosnian War; Post-Kosovo War

Major General Anders Bertil Callert (born 10 May 1965) is a Swedish Army officer. Callert served as Assistant Chief of Armed Forces Training & Procurement from 2016 to 2021. He currently serves as Deputy Vice-Chancellor of the Swedish Defence University.

== Early life ==
Callert was born on 10 May 1965 in Österhaninge Parish, Haninge Municipality, Sweden. He attended a 4-year Technical Program at Falu Gymnasium in Falun between 1981 and 1985, with a specialization in telecommunications. Callert then attended the Field Artillery Officers Course at the Swedish Artillery Officer School (Artilleriets officershögskola, ArtOHS) in Kristinehamn from 1986 to 1988 when he was commissioned as an officer with the rank of second lieutenant and was assigned to Norrland Artillery Regiment.

== Career ==
Callert served in Norrland Artillery Regiment for about ten years. He was promoted to captain in 1992 and major in 1996. During this time, Callert attended the General Course at Military Academy Karlberg in Stockholm from 1989 to 1990, the Higher Course at the Artillery and Engineering College in Stockholm from 1992 to 1992 and the General Course, tactical course for the Army at the Swedish Armed Forces Staff College in Stockholm from 1995 to 1996. From August 1996 to April 1997, Callert served as Deputy Section Chief of S3, in the Swedish battalion (SWEBAT, BA07) headquarters, part of the Stabilisation Force in Bosnia and Herzegovina (SFOR), a NATO-led multinational peacekeeping force deployed to Bosnia and Herzegovina after the Bosnian War.

Callert attended the Advanced Command Program at the Swedish Armed Forces Staff College from 1998 to 2000, with profiling in protection and countermeasures. He then served in Kosovo from October 2000 to May 2001 as a staff officer J7 in the Swedish contingent KS03. There he served as lieutenant colonel in a multinational NATO staff at the Kosovo Force (KFOR) headquarters in Kosovo. He then served as Army Tactical Command as a staff officer from June 2001 to December 2002, responsible för indirect fire. From January 2003 to March 2004, Callert served as a staff Officer responsible for indirect fire at Swedish Armed Forces Headquarters in Stockholm. After being promoted to lieutenant colonel, he served from 2004 to 2005 as commander of Norrland Artillery Battalion, from 2006 to 2008 as commanding officer of the Artillery Combat School (Artilleriets stridsskola, ArtSS) and from 2007 to 2008 also deputy regimental commander of the Artillery Regiment. Thereafter, Callert served from 2008 to 2010 as head of the Analysis and Follow-up Section in the Joint Forces Command at the Swedish Armed Forces Headquarters in Stockholm.

In 2010, he was promoted to colonel and served as regimental commander of the Artillery Regiment from 2010 to 2014. From 1 February 2014, he served in the Implementation Department (Genomförandeavdelningen) of Training & Procurement Staff at the Headquarters, for a period in 2014 as deputy head and from 2014 to 2016 as head. Callert was promoted to brigadier general in 2016 and from 1 June 2016, he served as Assistant Chief of Armed Forces Training & Procurement in the Training & Procurement Staff at the Headquarters. He was promoted to major general in 2017.

Callert assumed the position of head of the Swedish delegation to the Neutral Nations Supervisory Commission in Korea on 1 June 2021. On 23 October 2023, Callert assumed the position of Deputy Vice-Chancellor of the Swedish Defence University.

== Dates of rank ==
- 1988 – Second lieutenant
- 19?? – Lieutenant
- 1992 – Captain
- 1996 – Major
- 2004 – Lieutenant colonel
- 2010 – Colonel
- 2016 – Brigadier general
- 2017 – Major general

== Awards and decorations ==
=== Swedish ===
- (Sweden) For Zealous and Devoted Service of the Realm
- (Sweden) Swedish Armed Forces Conscript Medal
- (Sweden) Swedish Armed Forces International Service Medal
- (Sweden) Artillery Regiment Medal of Merit
- (Sweden) Norrland Artillery Regiment (A 4) Commemorative Medal (Norrlands artilleriregementes (A 4) minnesmedalj, NorrlartregSMM)
- (Sweden) Norrland Artillery Regiment (A 8) Commemorative Medal (Norrlands artilleriregementes (A 8) minnesmedalj, NorrlartregSMM)
- (Sweden) Norrland Artillery Battalion Commemorative Medal (Norrlands artilleribataljons minnesmedalj, NorrlMSM)

=== Foreign ===
- (South Korea) 3rd Class of the Order of National Security Merit, Cheonsu Medal (1 June 2023)
- (United States) Officer of the Legion of Merit (1 June 2023)
- (South Korea) Korean Service Medal (1 June 2023)
- NATO Medal for the former Yugoslavia (1996)
- NATO Medal for Kosovo x 2

Military offices
Preceded by Karl Engelbrektson	Assistant Chief of Armed Forces Training & Procurement; 2016–2021	Succeeded by Jonny Lindfors
Preceded by Lars-Olof Corneliusson	Head of Swedish Delegation to NNSC; 2021–2023	Succeeded by Lena Persson Herlitz
Preceded by Anders Persson	Deputy Vice-Chancellor of the Swedish Defence University; 2023–present	Succeeded by Incumbent
