= General Svensson =

General Svensson may refer to:

- Antero Svensson (1892–1946), Finnish Army major general
- Bengt Svensson (born 1958), Swedish Army major general
- Johan Svensson (Swedish Air Force officer) (born 1962), Swedish Air Force lieutenant general
