= Ulf Ling-Vannérus =

Swedish officer and fencer

Ulf Ling-Vannerus
- Born: Ulf Ragnar Ling-Vannerus; 26 May 1929 (age 97); Uddevalla, Sweden
- Military career
- Allegiance: Sweden
- Branch: Swedish Army
- Service years: 1950–1989
- Rank: Senior Colonel
- Commands: Värmland Regiment; Värmland Defence District; Swedrelief

Ulf Ling-Vannérus
Personal information
- Born: 26 May 1929 (age 97) Uddevalla, Sweden

Sport
- Sport: Fencing

Ulf Ragnar Ling-Vannerus (born 26 May 1929) is a Swedish officer and fencer. He competed in the team épée event at the 1960 Summer Olympics.

== Early life ==
Ling-Vannerus was born on 26 May 1929 in Uddevalla, Sweden, the son of colonel Herbert Ling-Vannerus and his wife Margit (née Gemzell). He passed studentexamen in 1947.

== Career ==
Ling-Vannérus was commissioned as an officer in the Swedish cavalry in 1950. He attended the Royal Swedish Army Staff College from 1958 to 1960 and became captain in the General Staff Corps in 1962. He was head of the Planning Office in the Tactics Department in the Army Staff in 1962 and served as a teacher at the Swedish Armed Forces Staff College from 1964 to 1966. Ling-Vannérus was promoted to ryttmästare in the cavalry in 1966 and served as company commander in the Swedish UN battalion in Cyprus, part of the United Nations Peacekeeping Force in Cyprus, from 1966 to 1967.

Back in Sweden, he served as head of ground operations at the staff of the Western Military District from 1967 to 1971 and as head of Section 1 in the staff of the Upper Norrland Military District from 1971 to 1973. He studied at the Swedish National Defence College in 1972. He served as deputy commander of Norrbotten Regiment from 1973 to 1976 and as defence attaché in Washington, D.C. and Ottawa from 1976 to 1980. He then served as colonel and deputy commander of Värmland Regiment in 1980 and senior colonel and commander of the same regiment and of Värmland Defence District (Värmlands försvarsområde, Fo 52) from 1980 to 1989. Ling-Vannérus was then head of the Swedish special unit for disaster relief (Swedrelief) from 1990 to 1996.

== Personal life ==
In 1957, Ling-Vannérus married Margareta Hallin (born 1935), the daughter of Herbert Hallin and Greta (née Molinder).

== Dates of rank ==
- 1950 – Second lieutenant
- 19?? – Lieutenant
- 1962 – Captain
- 1966 – Ryttmästare
- 19?? – Major
- 19?? – Lieutenant colonel
- 19?? – Colonel
- 1980 – Senior colonel

== Awards and decorations ==
- Legion of Merit

== Bibliography ==
- Ling-Vannerus, Ulf (1999). I katastrofens spår: SWEDRELIEF 1978-1996 [In the wake of the disaster: SWEDRELIEF 1978-1996] (in Swedish). Stockholm: Probus. ISBN 9187184591. SELIBR 7762942.
