= Värmland Brigade =

Inactive Swedish Army formation

- Värmlandsbrigaden
- Active: 1949–2000
- Country: Sweden
- Branch: Swedish Army
- Part of: Värmland Regiment (1949–1994); Milo M (1994–2000)
- Garrison/HQ: Kristinehamn Garrison
- Mottos: Cum Deo et victricibus armis ("With God and victorious arms")
- March: "Pepitamarsch" (Note: Composed by Carl Neumann. The march was adopted in 1994 and established on 13 June 1996.)
- Battle honours: Fredriksodde (1657); Tåget över Bält (1658); Lund (1677); Landskrona (1678); Narva (1700); Düna (1701); Kliszow (1702); Fraustadt (1706); Malatitze (1708); Gadebusch (1712)

Insignia
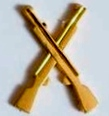
- Branch insignia

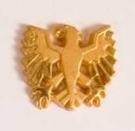
- Unit insignia

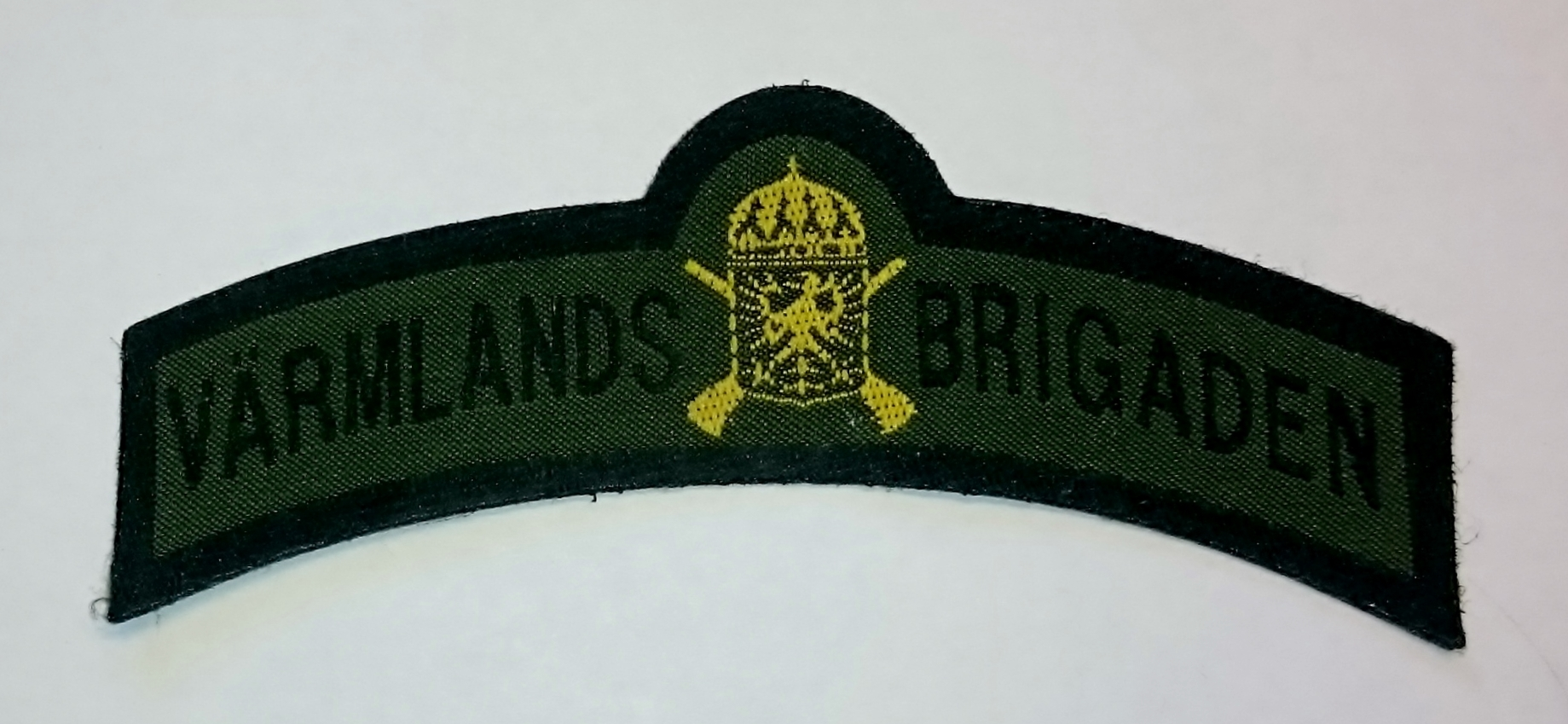
- Unit tab

The Värmland Brigade (Swedish: Värmlandsbrigaden), also known as the 2nd Infantry Brigade (IB 2), was an infantry brigade of the Swedish Army based in Värmland County. It served between 1949 and 2000. It was headquartered in Kristinehamn Garrison.

== History ==
The brigade was set up between 1949 and 1951. The brigade, together with the Värmland Regiment (I 2) was disbanded on 30 June 2000. The brigade's last commander was Colonel Björn Tomtlund.

== Order of battle ==
=== Infantry battalions ===
- 1st Örnbataljonen (Eagle Battalion)
- 2nd Vargbataljonen (Wolf Battalion)
- 3rd Djerfbataljonen (Wolverine Battalion)
- 4th Grenadjärbataljonen (Grenadier Battalion)

== Heraldry and traditions ==
The Värmland Brigade shared heraldry and traditions with the Värmland Regiment.

=== Coat of arms ===
The coat of the arms of the Värmland Brigade (IB 2) 1994–2000 which also was used by Värmland Regiment (I 2/Fo 52) 1977–1994. Blazon: "Argent, the provincial badge of Värmland, an eagle azure, wings elevated and displayed, armed and langued gules. The shield surmounted two muskets in saltire, or".

=== Medals ===
In 2000, the Värmlands regementes (I 2) och Värmlandsbrigadens (IB 2) minnesmedalj ("Värmland Regiment (I 2) and Värmland Brigade (IB 2) Commemorative Medal") in gold with black enamel (VärmlregbrigSMM) of the 8th size was established. The medal ribbon is of yellow moiré with broad black edges and two thinly placed red stripes on the middle. An eagle of gold is attached to the ribbon.

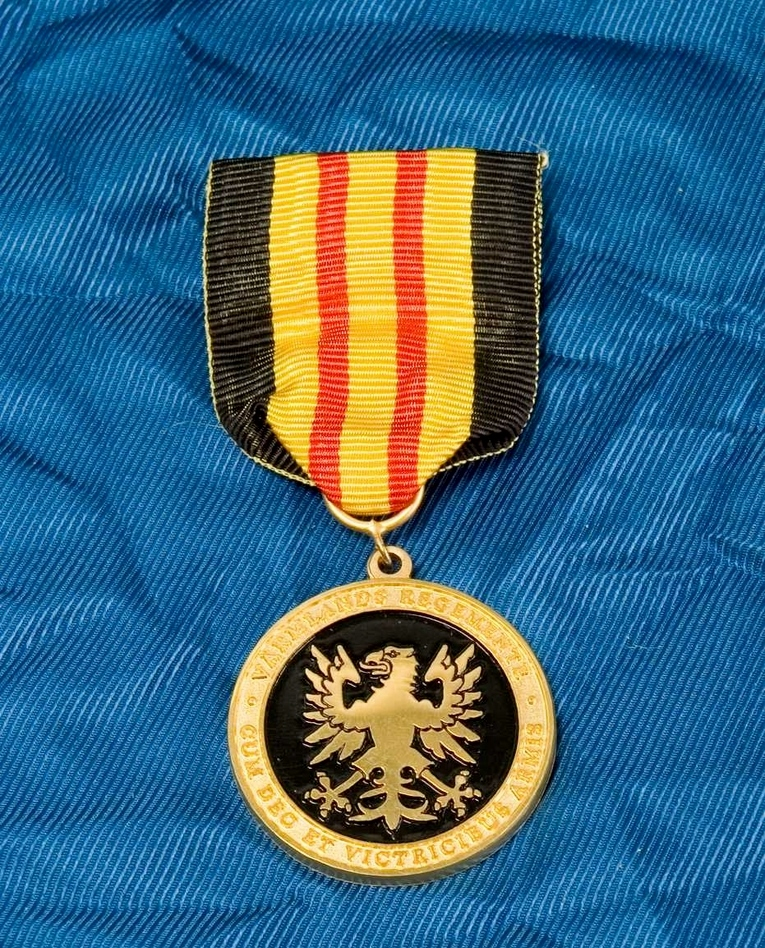
The Värmland Regiment (I 2) and Värmland Brigade (IB 2) Commemorative Medal

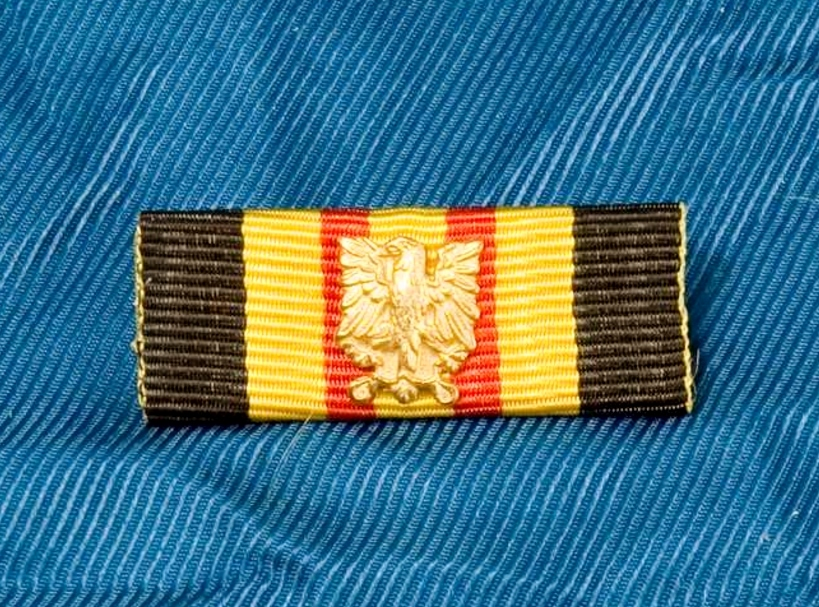
Ribbon bar of the Värmland Regiment (I 2) and Värmland Brigade (IB 2) Commemorative Medal

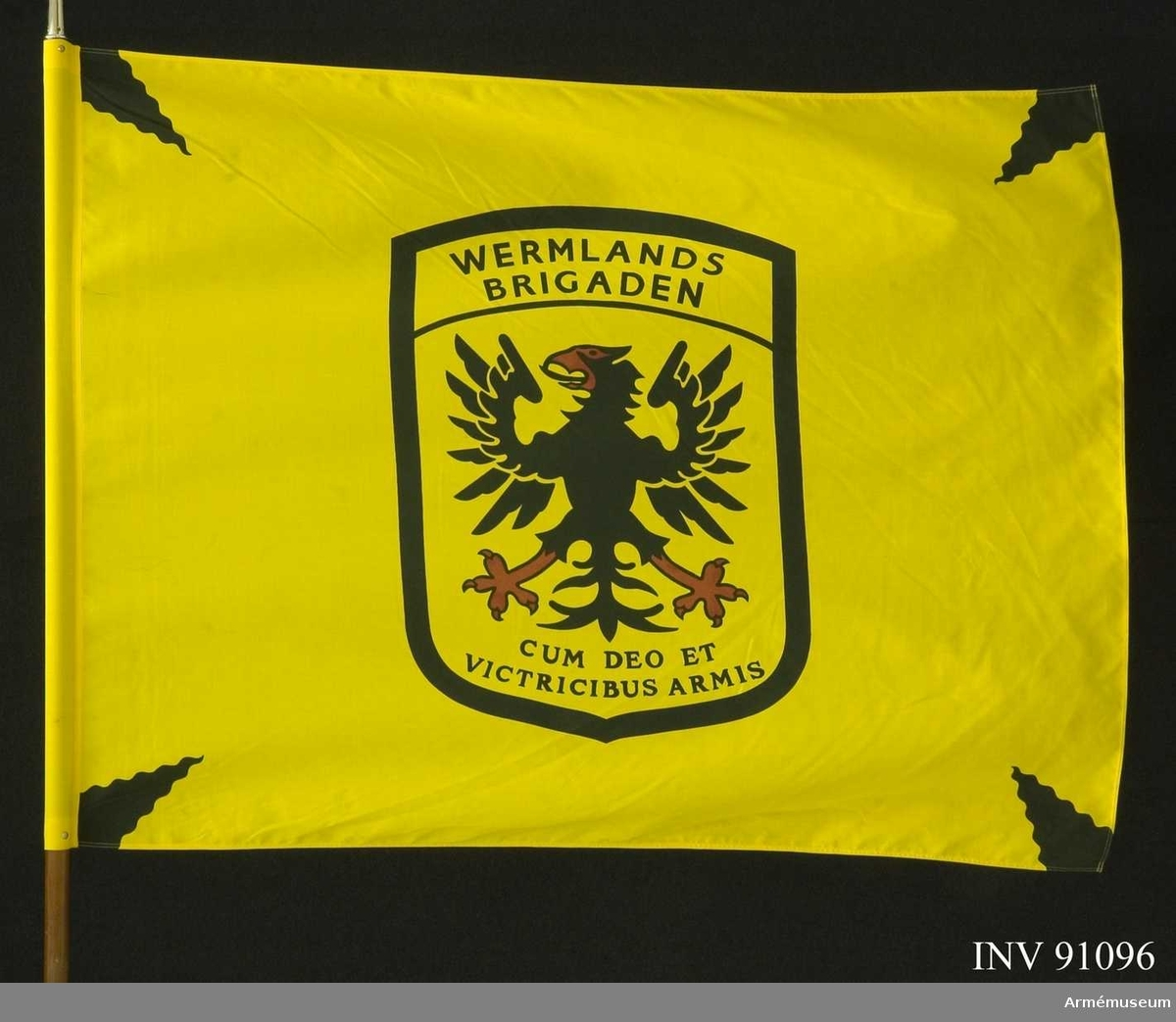
Colour of the Värmland Brigade.

== Commanding officers ==
Brigade commander from 1949 to 2000. During the years 1949–1994, the brigade commander was also acting commanding officer of Värmland Regiment.

- 1949–1980: ?
- 1980–1983: Lieutenant Colonel Jan Hage
- 1983–1988: Colonel Lennart Bergqvist
- 1988–1993: Colonel Ingvar S Klang
- 1993–1996: Tommy W Johansson
- 1997–2000: Björn Tomtlund

== Attributes ==
Name	Translation	From		To
Värmlandsbrigaden	Värmland Brigade	1949-10-01	–	2000-06-30
Designation		From		To
IB 2		1949-10-01	–	2000-06-30
Location		From		To
Karlstad Garrison		1949-10-01	–	1994-06-30
Kristinehamn Garrison		1994-07-01	–	2000-06-30

== See also ==
- Värmland Regiment
- List of Swedish Army brigades

== Sources ==
- Braunstein, Christian (2003). Sveriges arméförband under 1900-talet. Skrift / Statens försvarshistoriska museer, 1101-7023; 5 (in Swedish). Stockholm: Statens försvarshistoriska museer. ISBN 91-971584-4-5. SELIBR 8902928.
- Braunstein, Christian (2006). Heraldiska vapen inom det svenska försvaret [Heraldry of the Swedish Armed Forces] (PDF). Skrift / Statens försvarshistoriska museer, 1101-7023; 9 (in Swedish). Stockholm: Statens försvarshistoriska museer. ISBN 91-971584-9-6. SELIBR 10099224. Archived from the original (PDF) on 25 November 2018.
- Braunstein, Christian (2007). Utmärkelsetecken på militära uniformer [Decorations on Swedish military uniforms] (PDF). Skrift / Statens försvarshistoriska museer, 1101-7023; 12 (in Swedish). Stockholm: Statens försvarshistoriska museer. ISBN 978-91-976220-2-8. SELIBR 10423295. Archived from the original (PDF) on 19 August 2021.
- Kjellander, Rune (2003). Sveriges regementschefer 1700-2000: chefsbiografier och förbandsöversikter (in Swedish). Stockholm: Probus. ISBN 91-87184-74-5. SELIBR 8981272.
- Sandberg, Bo (2007). Försvarets marscher och signaler förr och nu: marscher antagna av svenska militära förband, skolor och staber samt igenkännings-, tjänstgörings- och exercissignaler (in Swedish) (New ed.). Stockholm: Militärmusiksamfundet med Svenskt marscharkiv. ISBN 978-91-631-8699-8. SELIBR 10413065.
