= Carl Otto Nordensvan =

Swedish general and military writer

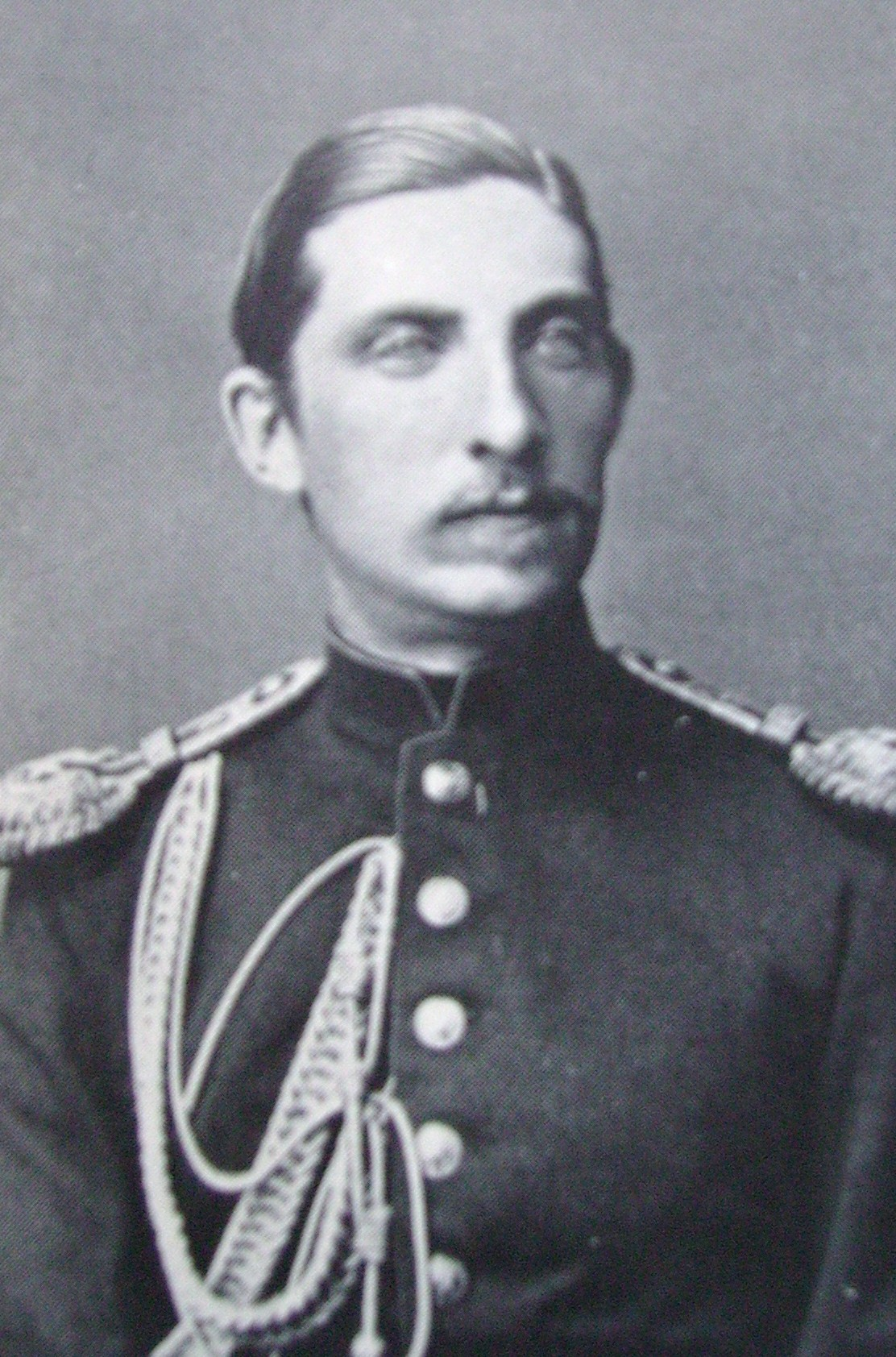
- Born: April 7, 1851; Stockholm, Sweden
- Died: March 30, 1924 (aged 72); Stockholm, Sweden
- Military career
- Allegiance: Sweden
- Branch: Swedish Army
- Service years: 1868–1911
- Rank: Major general
- Commands: Army Staff College; Värmland Regiment

Carl Otto Nordensvan (7 April 1851 – 30 March 1924) was a Swedish general and military writer. He published 24 books dealing with aspects of Swedish military history and related topics. He additionally wrote many articles for the specialist periodical Krigsvetenskapsakademins tidskrift and the general periodical Nordisk familjebok, and was joint editor of Svensk militär tidskrift.

== Publications ==
- Handbok för svenska arméns befäl 2 volumes, 1879-1880 (edited with Wilhelm Ernst von Krusenstjerna) )
- Öfversigt af Rysslands härorganisation (1879)
- Taktiska uppgifter för hemarbete (1884)
- En vandring öfver slagfälten i Sachsen (1886)
- Värnplikten och inskrifningsväsendet (1887)
- Vapenslagens stridssätt (1891)
- Kriget och krigsinrättningarna (1893)
- Studier öfver Mainfälttåget 1866 (1894)
- Fransk-tyska kriget 1870-1871 (1895)
- Krigarlif (1896), illustrerad
- Finska kriget 1808-1809 (1898)
- Nittonde århundradets militära tilldragelser (2 vols., 1899-1900)
- Värmlands regementes historia (ledare af arbetet 1903; ny upplaga av del II 1911), illustrated
- Svenska armén år 1908 (1906), ett kontroversiellt inlägg i debatten om hur armén borde organiseras efter unionsupplösningen
- Krigföringen i dess olika former (1907)
- 1808. Synpunkter och betraktelser (1908)
- Krigsmakten i Sverige 1860-1910 (1911)
- Svenska armén sådan den är och sådan den kunde vara (1911)
- Utkast till organisation af svenska armén (1912), fortsättning av den föregående, som byggde på Einar af Wirséns Den svenska folkhären
- Nordisk familjebok (1913) selected articles
- Finlands dödskamp (1913)
- Det stora världskriget, with Valdemar Langlet, (8 volumes, 1914-1919)
- Karl XII (1918), on Karl XII
- Världskriget 1914-18 (1922) on World War I
- August den starke (1923)
- På väg till Sveriges stormaktsvälde (1924)
