= Assistant Chief of Armed Forces Training & Procurement =

- Förbandsproduktionschefen
- Swedish Armed Forces
- Abbreviation: C PROD FPE/C FÖRBPROD
- Reports to: Chief of Armed Forces Training & Procurement
- Seat: Swedish Armed Forces Headquarters, Lidingövägen 24, Stockholm
- Term length: No fixed term
- Constituting instrument: FFS 2016:2; FIB 2020:5
- Formation: 2005
- First holder: Major General Jan Salestrand
- Final holder: Brigadier General Jonny Lindfors
- Abolished: 2022
- Unofficial names: Chefen för förbandsproduktion

The Assistant Chief of Armed Forces Training & Procurement (Swedish: Förbandsproduktionschefen, C PROD FPE/C FÖRBPROD, sometimes as Chefen för förbandsproduktion) or Chief of Training (Swedish: Utbildningschef) was a two-star role within the Training & Procurement Staff in the Swedish Armed Forces Headquarters, responsible for the Swedish military academies and Swedish Armed Forces Human Resources Center. The Assistant Chief of Armed Forces Training & Procurement reported to the Chief of Armed Forces Training & Procurement.

== Organisation ==
The Assistant Chief of Armed Forces Training & Procurement was also the Chief of Training (Utbildningschef).

The Assistant Chief of Armed Forces Training & Procurement together with the Chief of Army, Chief of Navy and Chief of Air Force as well as the Chief of Management System (Ledningssystemchefen, LSC), Chief of Defence Logistics, (Resursproduktionschefen, C PROD RPE) and the Chief of Home Guard reported to the Chief of Armed Forces Training & Procurement.

The following units reported to the Assistant Chief of Armed Forces Training & Procurement: the Swedish Armed Forces Human Resources Center (Försvarsmaktens HR-centrum, FM HRC), Military Academy Karlberg and Military Academy Halmstad (Militärhögskolan Halmstad, MHS H).

== Assistant Chiefs of Armed Forces Training & Procurement ==
No.	Portrait	Chief of Defence Staff	Took office	Left office	Time in office	Defence branch	Prime Minister	Ref.
1	Jan Salestrand	Major general Jan Salestrand (born 1954)	2005	2007	1–2 years	Air Force	Göran Persson; Fredrik Reinfeldt	
2	Göran Mårtensson	Brigadier general Göran Mårtensson (born 1960)	2007	2009	1–2 years	Army	Fredrik Reinfeldt	
3	Gunnar Karlson	Major general Gunnar Karlson (born 1960)	2009	4 June 2012	2–3 years	Army	Fredrik Reinfeldt	
4	Bengt Svensson	Major general Bengt Svensson (born 1958)	4 June 2012	12 October 2014	1–2 years	Army	Fredrik Reinfeldt	
5	Karl Engelbrektson	Major general Karl Engelbrektson (born 1962)	13 October 2014	30 May 2016	1 year, 230 days	Army	Stefan Löfven	
6	Anders Callert	Major general (Note: Callert was brigadier general when taking office on 1 June 2016 and was promoted to major general on 26 January 2017.); Anders Callert (born 1965)	1 June 2016	2021	4–5 years	Army	Stefan Löfven	
7	Jonny Lindfors	Brigadier general Jonny Lindfors (born 1975)	16 March 2021	31 December 2022	1 year, 290 days	Army	Stefan Löfven	
