= Värmland Regiment =

Swedish Army infantry regiment

Coordinates: 59°23′16″N 13°29′24″E

- Värmlands regemente
- Active: 1812–2000
- Country: Sweden
- Allegiance: Swedish Armed Forces
- Branch: Swedish Army
- Type: Infantry
- Size: Regiment
- Part of: 3rd Military District (1833–1893); 3rd Army Division (1893–1901); IV Army Division (1902–1927); Western Army Division (1928–1936); III Army Division (1937–1942); V Military District (1942–1966); Bergslagen Military District (1966–1991); Middle Military District (1991–2000)
- Garrison/HQ: Karlstad, Kristinehamn
- Motto(s): Cum Deo et victricibus armis (Note: The motto appeared on one of the regiment's colours from 1658. It was later used by the 19th Home Guard Battalion.) ("With God and victorious arms")
- Colors: Yellow and black
- March: "Pepitamarsch" (Neumann) (Note: The march was adopted in the late 1800s, was established in 1953 by Army Order 33/1953. The march was used by the Värmland Brigade from 1994 to 2000 and by the Värmland Group from 2000 to 2004.)
- Battle honours: Fredriksodde (1657), Tåget över Bält (1658), Lund (1677), Landskrona (1678), Narva (1700), Düna (1701), Kliszow (1702), Fraustadt (1706), Malatitze (1708), Gadebusch (1712)

Insignia
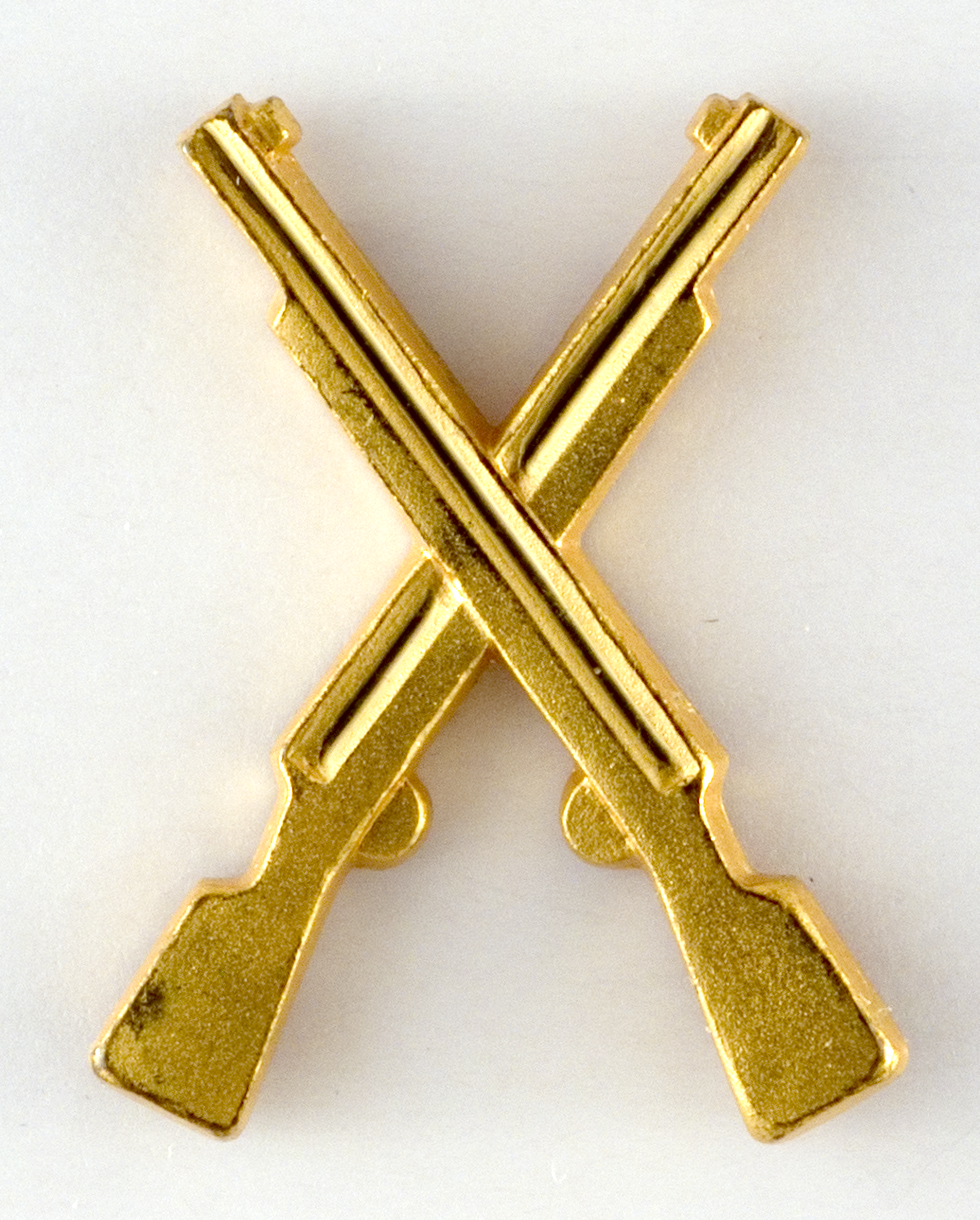
- Branch insignia m/60

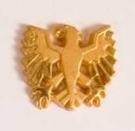
- Unit insignia m/60

The Värmland Regiment (Swedish: Värmlands regemente), designations I 22, I 2 and I 2/Fo 52, was a Swedish Army infantry regiment that traces its origins back to the 16th century. The regiment's soldiers were originally recruited from the province of Värmland, where the unit was later garrisoned. The unit was disbanded as a result of the disarmament policies set forward in the Defence Act of 2000.

== History ==
The regiment has its origins in fänikor (companies) raised in Värmland in the 16th century. These units—along with fänikor from the nearby province of Närke—were organised into Närke-Värmland Regiment, which was split into two new regiments in 1812, one being Värmland Regiment, the other being Närke Regiment. The regiment was given the designation I 22 (22nd Infantry Regiment) in a general order in 1816. The designation was changed to I 2 (2nd Infantry Regiment) in 1939. In 1973, the regiment gained the new designation I 2/Fo 52 as a consequence of a merge with the local defence district Fo 52. Värmland Regiment was garrisoned in Karlstad from 1913 moved to Kristinehamn in 1994 before being disbanded in 2000.

== Campaigns ==
- The Campaign against Norway (1814)

== Organisation ==
1812

- Livkompaniet
- Kils kompani
- Jösse kompani
- Älvdals kompani
- Grums kompani
- Nordmarks kompani
- Näs kompani
- Gillbergs kompani

== Heraldry and traditions ==
=== Colours, standards and guidons ===
After the regiment was raised in 1812, it was presented with on life colour and five battalion colours of the 1814 model. On 12 July 1849, the regiment was presented with two new colours for the 1st Battalion and the 2nd Battalion. The presenting was made by King Oscar I. In 1913 the colour was restored and one more battle honour was added. A new colour was presented to the regiment at the Artillery Yard in Stockholm by the commanding officer of the Middle Military District, major general Kjell Koserius on 13 May 2000. It was used as regimental colour by I 2/Fo 52 until 1 July 2000. From 1994, the colour was carried by both the regiment and the brigade. From 1 July 2000, the colour was carried by the Värmland Group (Värmlandsgruppen), and from 1 July 2005 by the Örebro-Värmland Group ( Örebro-Värmlandsgruppen).

The colour is drawn by Kristina Holmgård-Åkerberg and embroidered by machine in insertion technique by the company Libraria. Blazon: "On yellow cloth the provincial badge of Värmland; a black eagle, wings elevated and displayed, armed red. On a black border at the upper side of the colour, battle honours Fredriksodde 1657, Tåget över Bält 1658, Lund 1677, Landskrona 1678, Narva 1700, Düna 1701, Kliszow 1702, Fraustadt 1706, Malatitze 1708, Gadebusch 1712 in yellow".

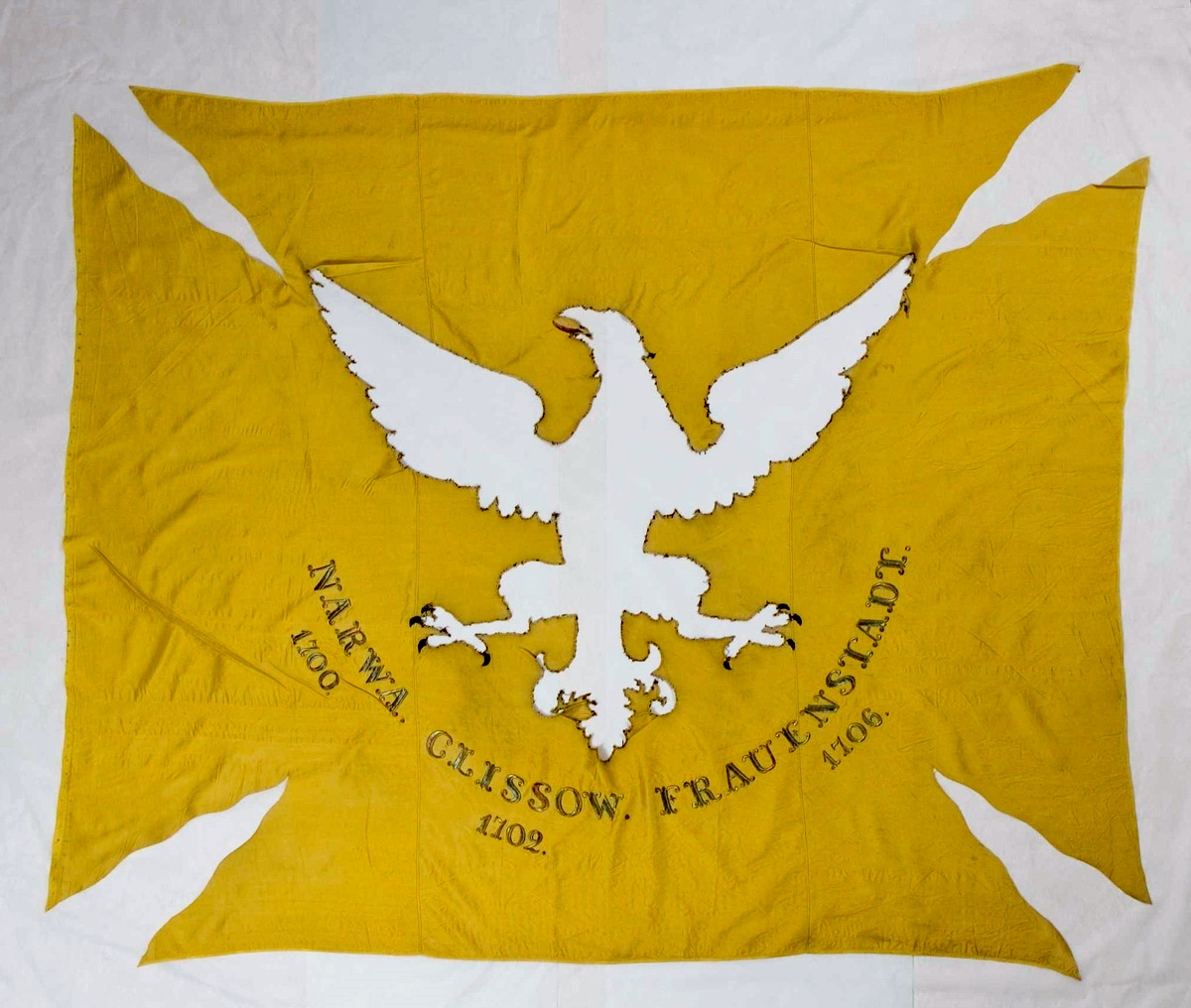
1849 colour of Värmland Regiment.

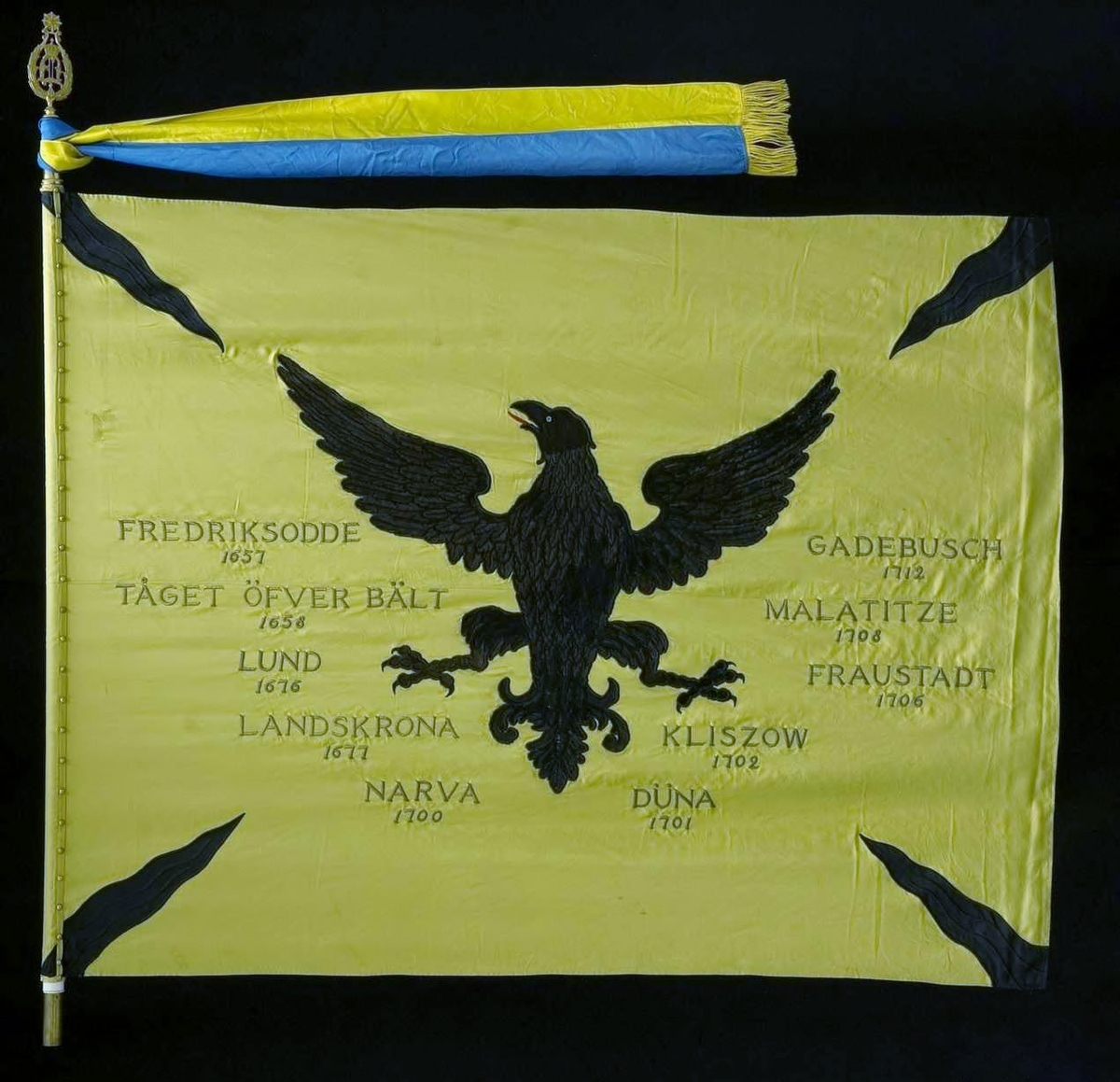
1912 colour of Värmland Regiment.

=== Coat of arms ===
The coat of the arms of the Värmland Regiment (I 2/Fo 52) 1977–1994 and the Värmland Brigade (IB 2) 1994–2000. Blazon: "Argent, the provincial badge of Värmland, an eagle azure, wings elevated and displayed, armed and langued gules. The shield surmounted two muskets in saltire, or". The coat of the arms of the Värmland Regiment (I 2/Fo 52) 1994–2000 and the Värmland Group (Värmlandsgruppen) 2000–2004. Blazon: "Argent, the provincial badge of Värmland, an eagle wings elevated and displayed azure, armed and langued gules. The shield surmounted two swords in saltire, or".

Coat of arms of the Värmland Regiment (I 2/Fo 52) 1977–1994 and the Värmland Brigade (IB 2) 1994–2000.

Coat of the arms of the Värmland Regiment (I 2/Fo 52) 1994–2000 and the Värmland Group (Värmlandsgruppen) 2000–2004.

=== Medals ===
In 1941, the Värmlands regementes (I 2) guldmedalj för framstående idrottsprestationer ("Värmland Regiment (I 2) gold medal for distinguished sport achievements") (VärmlregidrGM) of the 8th size was established. The medal ribbon divided in yellow and black moiré.

In 1994, the Värmlands regementes förtjänsttecken ("Värmland Regiment Medal of Merit") in gold (VärmlregGFt) was established.

In 2000, the Värmlands regementes (I 2) och Värmlandsbrigadens (IB 2) minnesmedalj ("Värmland Regiment (I 2) and Värmland Brigade (IB 2) Commemorative Medal") in gold with black enamel (VärmlregbrigSMM) of the 8th size was established. The medal ribbon is of yellow moiré with broad black edges and two thinly placed red stripes on the middle. An eagle of gold is attached to the ribbon.

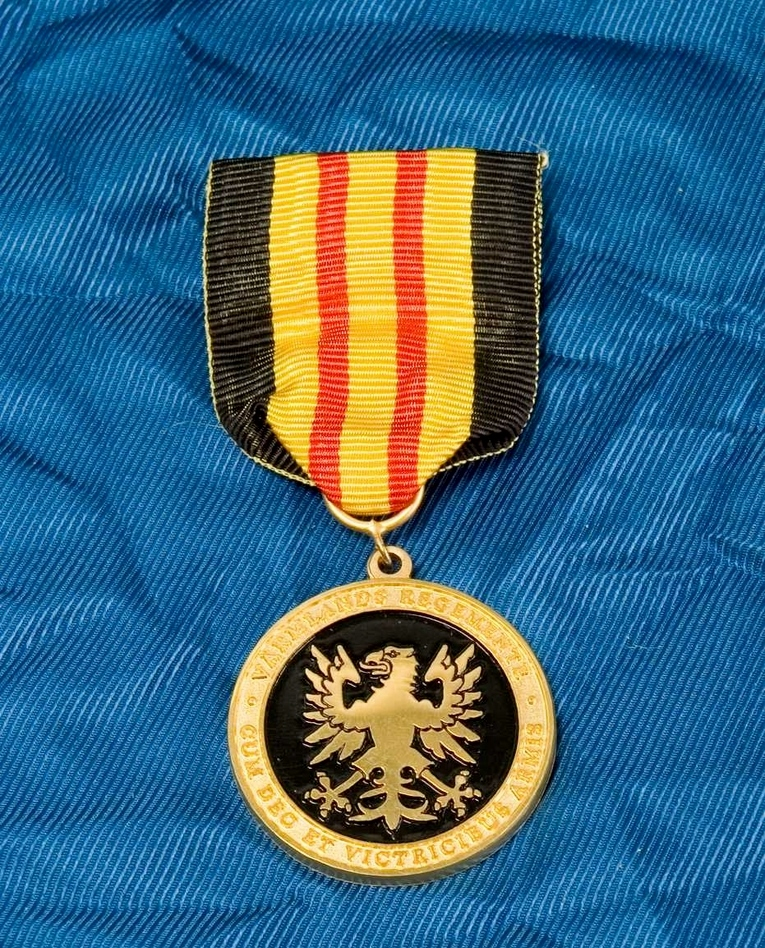
The Värmland Regiment (I 2) and Värmland Brigade (IB 2) Commemorative Medal

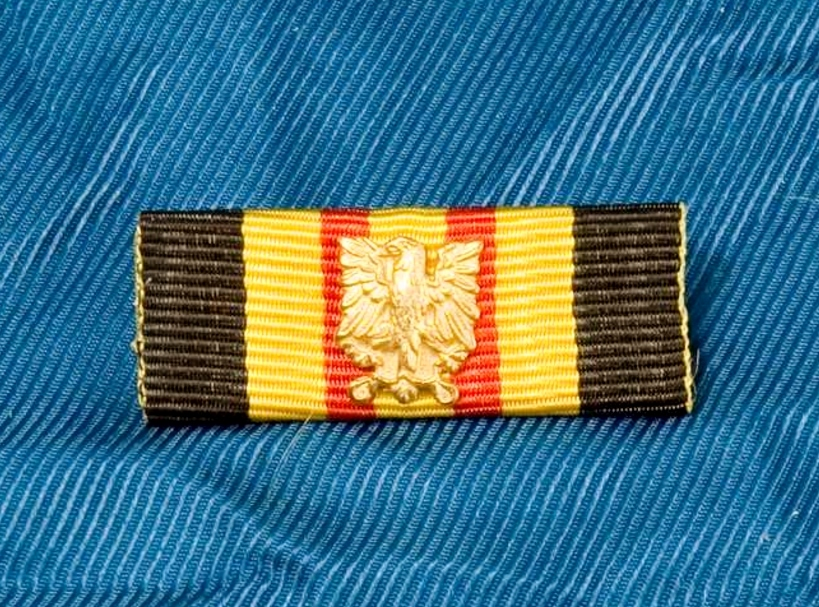
Ribbon bar of the Värmland Regiment (I 2) and Värmland Brigade (IB 2) Commemorative Medal

== Commanding officers ==
Regimental commanders active at the regiment during the years 1812–2000.

=== Commanders ===
- 1812–1840: Carl Cederström
- 1840–1856: O A Malmborg
- 1856–1859: O A Brunecrona
- 1859–1864: J H Rosensvärd
- 1864–1877: A L T Wijkander
- 1877–1881: J H Lemke
- 1881–1892: Helmer Falk
- 1892–1900: Ernst August Winroth
- 1901–1911: Colonel Carl Otto Nordensvan
- 1911–1917: Arvid Emil Uggla
- 1918–1927: Axel Gustaf Adolf Leijonhufvud
- 1928–1935: Claës Axel Klingenstierna
- 1935–1939: Thord Rickard Evers
- 1939–1951: Fredrik Grevillius
- 1951–1953: Colonel Regner Leuhusen
- 1953–1961: Sven Holmberg
- 1961–1969: Carl Gustav Henrik Gideon Linnell
- 1969–1980: Senior colonel Per Sune Wallin
- 1980–1989: Senior colonel Ulf Ling-Vannérus
- 1989–1994: Dan Albin Snell
- 1994–2000: Yngve Johansson
- 2000–2000: Björn Tomtlund

=== Deputy commanders ===
- 1979–1980: Colonel Krister Larsson (acting)
- 1980–1980: Colonel Ulf Ling-Vannerus
- 1980–1981: Colonel Lennart Frick
- 1981–1983: Colonel Ingvar Rittsél

== Names, designations and locations ==
Name	Translation	From		To
Kungl Värmlands regemente	Royal Värmland Regiment	1812-06-08	–	1974-12-31
Värmlands regemente	Värmland Regiment	1975-01-01	–	2000-06-30
Avvecklingsorganisation	Decommissioning Organisation	2000-07-01	–	2001-03-31
Designation		From		To
№ 22		1816-10-01	–	1914-09-30
I 22		1915-10-01	–	1939-09-30
I 2		1939-10-01	–	1973-06-30
I 2/Fo 52		1973-07-01	–	2000-06-30
Location		From		To
Kristinehamn		1684	–	1817
Varpnäs mo		1817	–	1834
Trossnäs fält		1834	–	1913
Karlstad Garrison		1913-10-01	–	1994-06-30
Kristinehamn Garrison		1994-07-01	–	2001-03-31

== See also ==
- List of Swedish infantry regiments
