= Battle of Nabe =

Battle between Swedish and Danish forces

- Part of the Dano-Swedish War (1657–1658)
Date	3 October, 1657
Location	Nabe, Agger
Result	Swedish victory

Belligerents
(yes) Swedish Empire	Denmark–Norway

Commanders and leaders
(Swedish Empire) Böddeker	(Denmark–Norway) Niels Lykke (POW) (Denmark–Norway) Friedrich Ziegler (POW)

Units involved
(Swedish Empire) Three cavalry regiments	(Denmark–Norway) Nabe redoubt

Strength
500–700 cavalry	900 peasants 150 cavalry

Casualties and losses
Unknown	60–800 killed Everyone else captured

The Battle of Nabe was fought between Danish and Swedish forces at Nabe on October 3 1657. The Swedes attacked the Danish redoubt and successfully captured both Danish commanders and crushed the popular resistance in Jutland as a consequence of the battle.

== Background ==
In October, during the ongoing Siege of Fredriksodde, Carl Gustaf Wrangel was forced to conserve his supplies. He therefore sent three cavalry regiments, amounting to some 500–700 horse under Generalmajor Böddeker, towards northern Jutland, in order to both subjugate it and to gather food and fodder for the Swedish horses.

== Battle ==
On 3 October, the cavalry under Böddeker encountered a Danish redoubt at Nabe in Agger defended by 150 Danish cavalry and around 1,500–2,000 peasant levies, respectively under the Lieutenant Colonels Niels Lykke and Friedrich Ziegler. At the time, Lykke was off visiting relatives, and Ziegler was drunk and possibly also away from the redoubt, while the peasants were unenthusiastic about battle. As a consequence, some 600 peasants deserted immediately before the Swedish attack.

This reduced the Danish strength to, at most, around 150 cavalry and 900 peasants. In the ensuing short but intense battle, the Swedes under Böddeker killed many peasants and soon also managed to capture both Lykke and Ziegler, along with the rest. Many of the peasants fled north, closely pursued by the Swedes who ruthlessly killed anyone they caught up with.

The exact number of dead is unknown, with some figures stating 80 cavalry and 200 peasants dead, although contemporary church records indicate no more than around 60 killed. Other sources claim 800 peasants were killed in the fighting.

Böddeker believed that the peasants needed to be taught a lesson. However, the captured peasants were quickly released to return home, carrying with them a strict warning to lay down their weapons and instead go back to their labor.

== Aftermath ==
As a consequence of the battle, all popular resistance against the Swedes that still remained in Jutland was shattered, and the Jutland peasants henceforth took no active part in the war.

=== Legacy ===
On the 300th anniversary of the battle, a memorial stone was erected at the battlefield. It was placed in a location where the fleeing Danes and pursuing Swedes must have passed.

== Works cited ==
- Isacsson, Claes-Göran (2015). Karl X Gustavs krig: Fälttågen i Polen, Tyskland, Baltikum, Danmark och Sverige 1655-1660 [Wars of Charles X Gustav: The campaigns in Poland, Germany, the Baltics, Denmark and Sweden 1655-1660] (in Swedish). Historiska Media. p. 148. ISBN 9789175450117.
- Sundberg, Ulf (2010). Sveriges krig 1630-1814 [Sweden's wars 1630–1814] (in Swedish). Svenskt militärhistoriskt bibliotek. ISBN 9789185789634.
- Essen, Michael Fredholm von (2023). Charles X's Wars: Volume 3 - The Danish Wars, 1657-1660. Helion & Company. p. 166. ISBN 9781915113603.
