= Jonny Lindfors =

Swedish army general (born 1975)

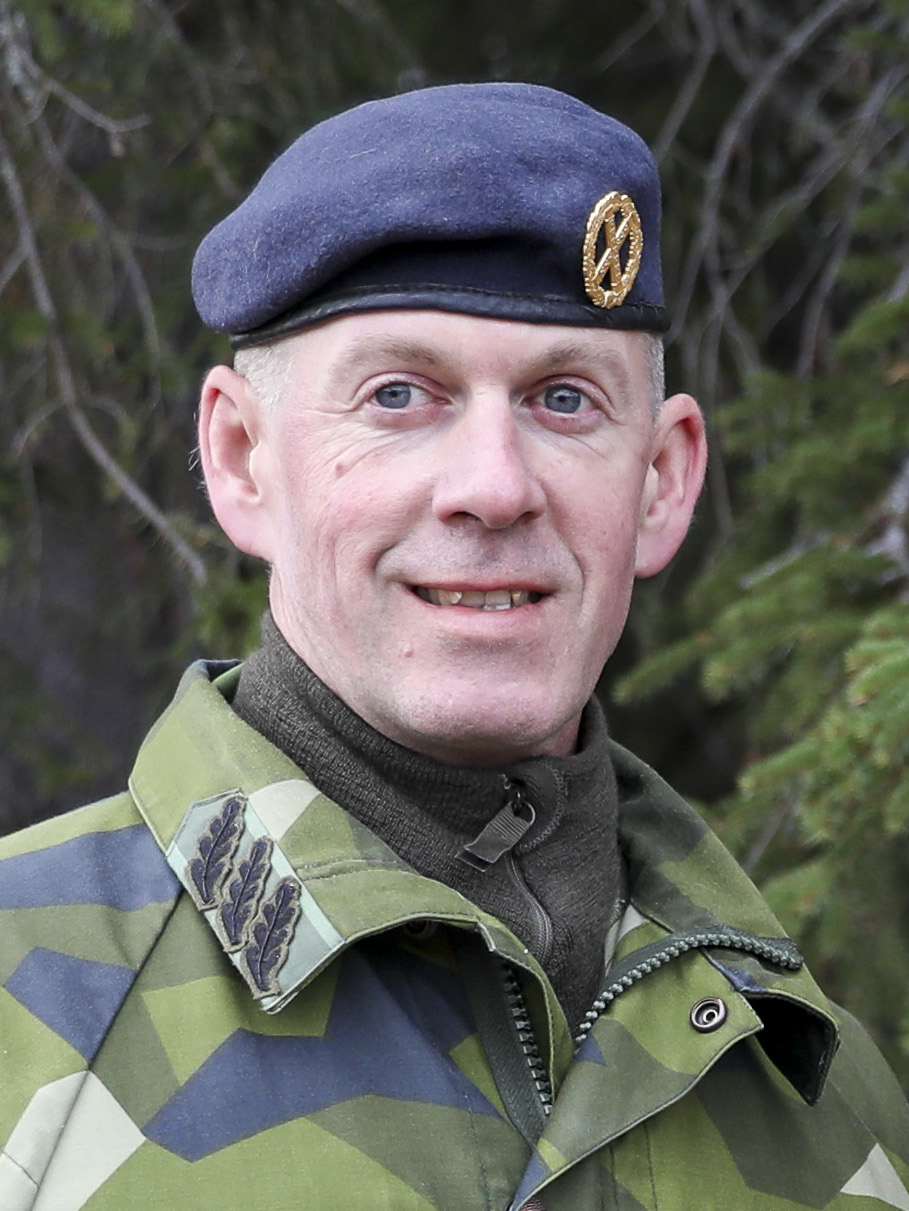
- Lindfors in 2023
- Born: Dan Jonny Mattias Lindfors; 25 February 1975 (age 51); Jukkasjärvi, Sweden
- Military career
- Allegiance: Sweden
- Branch: Swedish Army
- Service years: 1998–present
- Rank: Lieutenant general
- Commands: King's Guard Battalion; Norrbotten Regiment; Assistant Chief of Armed Forces Training & Procurement; Chief of Army
- Conflicts: Post-Kosovo War; War in Afghanistan

Lieutenant General Dan Jonny Mattias Lindfors (born 25 February 1975) is a Swedish Army officer who was commissioned in 1998. He has served in operational and command positions in Sweden and abroad, including deployments to Kosovo and Afghanistan. He has held several senior roles at Swedish Armed Forces Headquarters and commanded the Norrbotten Regiment. In 2021, he was promoted to brigadier general and appointed Assistant Chief of Armed Forces Training & Procurement. In June 2023, he became Chief of the Swedish Army and was promoted to major general. Since July 2026, he has served as Sweden's Military Representative to the EU and NATO in Brussels, with the rank of lieutenant general.

== Early life ==
Lindfors was born on 25 February 1975 in Jukkasjärvi Parish in Jukkasjärvi, Norrbotten County, Sweden. He grew up in Kiruna in a family of miners. Lindfors wanted to be a fire engineer, sports teacher or architect as a youngster. He chose the military after his mandatory military service in Västernorrland Regiment (I 21) in Sollefteå.

== Career ==
Lindfors was commissioned as an officer in 1998 and was assigned a second lieutenant to Västerbotten Regiment (I 20) in Umeå but was transferred to Lapland Ranger Regiment (I 22) in Kiruna in connection with the Defence Act of 1997 which meant that I 20 was disbanded. He served in the Kosovo Force (KFOR) in Kosovo in 2001 and during the early 2010s, Lindfors served as major and commander of the 14th Military Police Company in the Life Guards in Kungsängen. He served in Afghanistan in 2011. Lindfors has undergone higher staff training at the Swedish National Defence College, has a master's degree in military science, and has attended the Danish Defence Chief's Security Policy Course. Lindfors served in the Training & Procurement Staff at the Swedish Armed Forces Headquarters in Stockholm and in the role was responsible for the planning of the war units' organization and growth until 1 October 2016 when he, as a lieutenant colonel, took up the post as commander of the King's Guard Battalion (Livbataljonen) in the Life Guards. He left this post on 5 June 2017.

Lindfors then attended the United States Army War College in Carlisle, Pennsylvania, United States for a year. On his return home in 2018, he was promoted to colonel and appointed commander of the Norrbotten Regiment from 1 October 2018. He was then at the disposal of the Chief of Armed Forces Training & Procurement at the Swedish Armed Forces Headquarters from 18 January 2021. He was promoted in 2021 to brigadier general and was appointed Assistant Chief of Armed Forces Training & Procurement in the Training & Procurement Staff in the Swedish Armed Forces Headquarters from 16 March 2021. As Assistant Chief of Armed Forces Training & Procurement, his task was to distribute both resources and assignments to military branches and units. Since 1 January 2023, Lindfors is at the disposal of the Chief of the Defence Staff. Lindfors succeeded Major General Karl Engelbrektson as Chief of Army on 18 June 2023. At the same time, he was promoted to major general. 48 years old when he took office, he is the youngest person to hold the post of army chief in Sweden.

On 1 July 2026, he succeeded Vice Admiral Jonas Haggren as Swedish Military Representative to the EU and NATO in Brussels.

== Personal life ==
Lindfors is married and has two children.

== Dates of rank ==
- 1998 – Second lieutenant
- ???? – Lieutenant
- ???? – Captain
- ???? – Major
- ???? – Lieutenant colonel
- 2018 – Colonel
- 16 March 2021 – Brigadier general
- 18 June 2023 – Major general
- 1 July 2026 – Lieutenant general

== Awards and decorations ==
=== Swedish ===
- (Sweden) Swedish Armed Forces Conscript Medal
- (Sweden) Swedish Armed Forces International Service Medal
- (Sweden) Norrbotten Regiment Medal of Merit
- (Sweden) Swedish Reserve Officers Federation Merit Badge (Förbundet Sveriges Reservofficerares förtjänsttecken)
- (Sweden) Lapland Ranger Regiment Commemorative Medal

=== Foreign ===
- (Netherlands) Cross for the Four Day Marches
- NATO Medal for Kosovo
- NATO Non-Article 5 medal for ISAF

== Honours ==
- Member of the Royal Swedish Academy of War Sciences (2022)

Military offices
Preceded by Anders Callert	Assistant Chief of Armed Forces Training & Procurement; 2021–2023	Succeeded by None
Preceded by Karl Engelbrektson	Chief of Army; 2023–2026	Succeeded by Johan Pekkari
Preceded by Jonas Haggren	Sweden's Military Representative to the EU and NATO; 2026–present	Succeeded by Incumbent
