= Nordic Battlegroup =

- Coat of arms
- Active: 2008–present
- Country: Sweden; Finland; Norway; Estonia; Ireland; Latvia; Lithuania
- Allegiance: European Union
- Branch: EU Battlegroups
- Role: Multi (Sea, Air and Land)
- Size: 2500
- Part of: EU Battle Group
- Garrison/HQ: Enköping, Sweden (can change to other participating countries)
- Mottos: Ad omnia paratus ("Prepared for anything")
- Colors: Blue, silver and gold

Commanders
- Current commander: Brig-Gen Stefan Andersson

The Nordic Battlegroup (NBG) is one of eighteen European Union battlegroups. It consists of around 2,500 soldiers including officers, with manpower contributed from the seven participating Northern European countries, Sweden, Finland, Norway, Ireland, Estonia, Latvia, and Lithuania. The military strategic command of the force is done in cooperation with any of the suitable five Operation Headquarters framework nations at the time for deployment. Before 2022, Denmark opted out of the Common Security and Defence Policy of the EU, hence all battlegroups. Norway has negotiated an opt-in to participate, even though it is not an EU member state. Sweden, Finland and Norway have planned to form a joint battlegroup.

== Alert periods ==
=== 2008 ===
The unit was ready for operations between January 2008 and June 2008.

=== 2011 ===
The battle group second alert period was between 1 January and 30 June 2011. This had been planned by a core of staff officers since January 2009. On the 31st of August 2009 the "Key Nucleus" of the Force Headquarters arrived in Enköping in order to establish a functional staff. During autumn 2009 the main focus has been education and internal processes. Spring 2010 was used for planning, case study and exercise Combined Joint Staff Exercise CJSE 10. Autumn 2010 is an intense exercise period with Illuminated Summer 10, Initial Effort 10 and Joint Action 10. 1 January the Nordic Battlegroup is on standby to be deployed within 10 days. All personnel shall be at their operating bases within 48 hours after the decision to launch an operation is taken.

Participating countries

== Order of battle ==
The unit uses a modular organisation with a mechanised infantry battalion at its core. For NBG 2008 it was the 41. Rapid Reaction Battalion from Skaraborgs regemente and for NBG 2011 it was the 192. Core Battalion Norrbottens regemente (I19). During 2011 a framework existed for the integration of additional resources. These resources ranged from artillery, air defence, and intelligence to additional logistical support. Additional support in the form of air, naval and special forces assets would be allocated based on the operational tasks the unit was expected to perform.

== Coat of arms ==
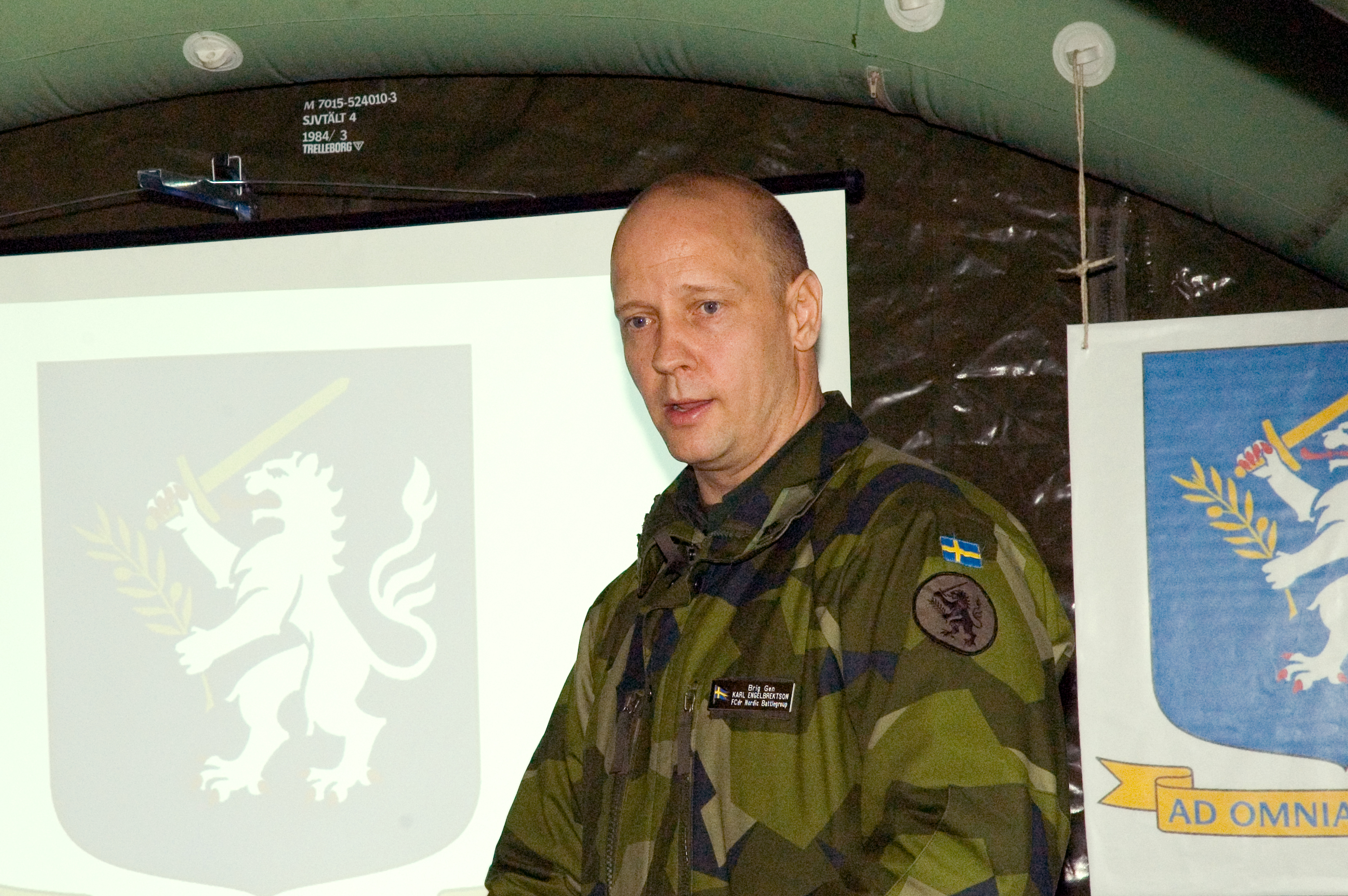
Commander Karl Engelbrektson next to coats of arms of the Nordic Battlegroup on 15 March 2007

Command sign

The unit's coat of arms, registered in 2008, is a blue escutcheon displaying a silver lion with red tongue and claws, holding in his right forepaw a sword and in his left an olive branch, both of gold. The motto is Ad omnia paratus (Latin: Prepared for anything). The lion is a national symbol common to the constituent countries of the Nordic Battlegroup except Ireland, and the sword and olive branch signify the ambition to impose peace — with or without the use of violence.

The Nordic Battlegroup's coat of arms was originally designed to incorporate heraldic elements and colours from all member nations, including "a lion that did not look Finnish, Norwegian, Estonian or Swedish."

In 2007, commander Karl Engelbrektson decided that the lion's penis had to be removed. Contrary to initial media reports that the decision was taken following complaints from female soldiers, Engelbrektsson revealed in a February 2008 interview with Sveriges Radio that it was he who made the decision, based on the 2000 United Nations Security Council Resolution 1325 on women, peace, and security. Since civilian women are often sexually assaulted in the war zones of the world, the commander did not consider the depiction of a penis appropriate on a uniform worn into battle. The decision was questioned by some Swedish heraldists, with Vladimir Sagerlund asserting that coats of arms containing lions without a penis were historically given to those who had betrayed the Swedish Crown. The state heraldist Henrik Klackenberg complained that his heraldry unit should have been consulted before making such change, but did not intend to take legal action.

In an unusual move, the Swedish Armed Forces Heraldry Council authorised the Nordic Battlegroup commander's use of a command sign. This consisted of a bunting divided into fields of blue, gold and blue with a Roman numeral V in the gold field, since the unit would be the fifth mobilized combat unit of the European Union.

== Force ==
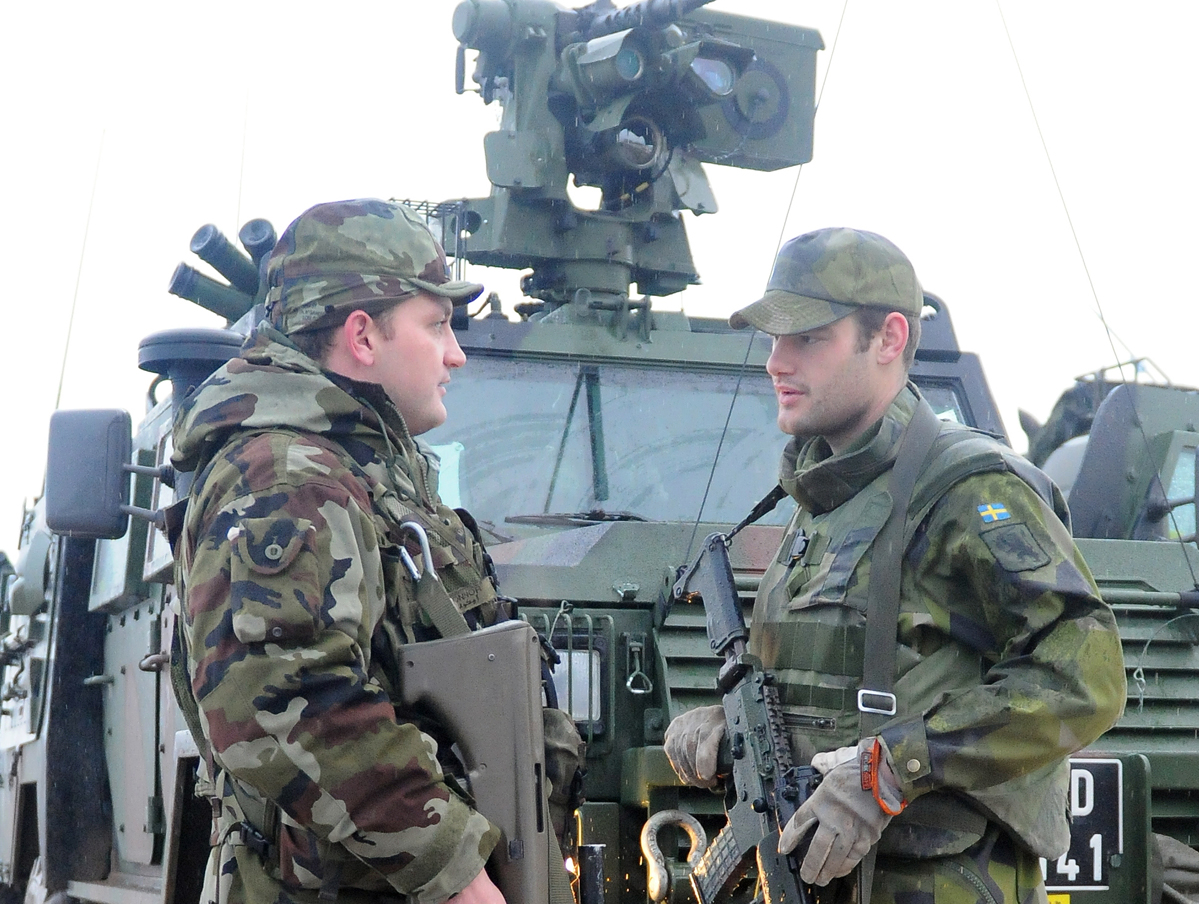
Soldiers of the Irish and Swedish militaries wielding a Steyr AUG and an Ak 5, respectively

As of December 2014, the Nordic Battlegroup consisted of around 2,500 officers and soldiers:

- Sweden: 1900
- Finland: 60
- Ireland: 170
- Estonia: 50
- Latvia: 150
- Lithuania: 50
- Norway: 50

== Equipment ==
=== Vehicles ===
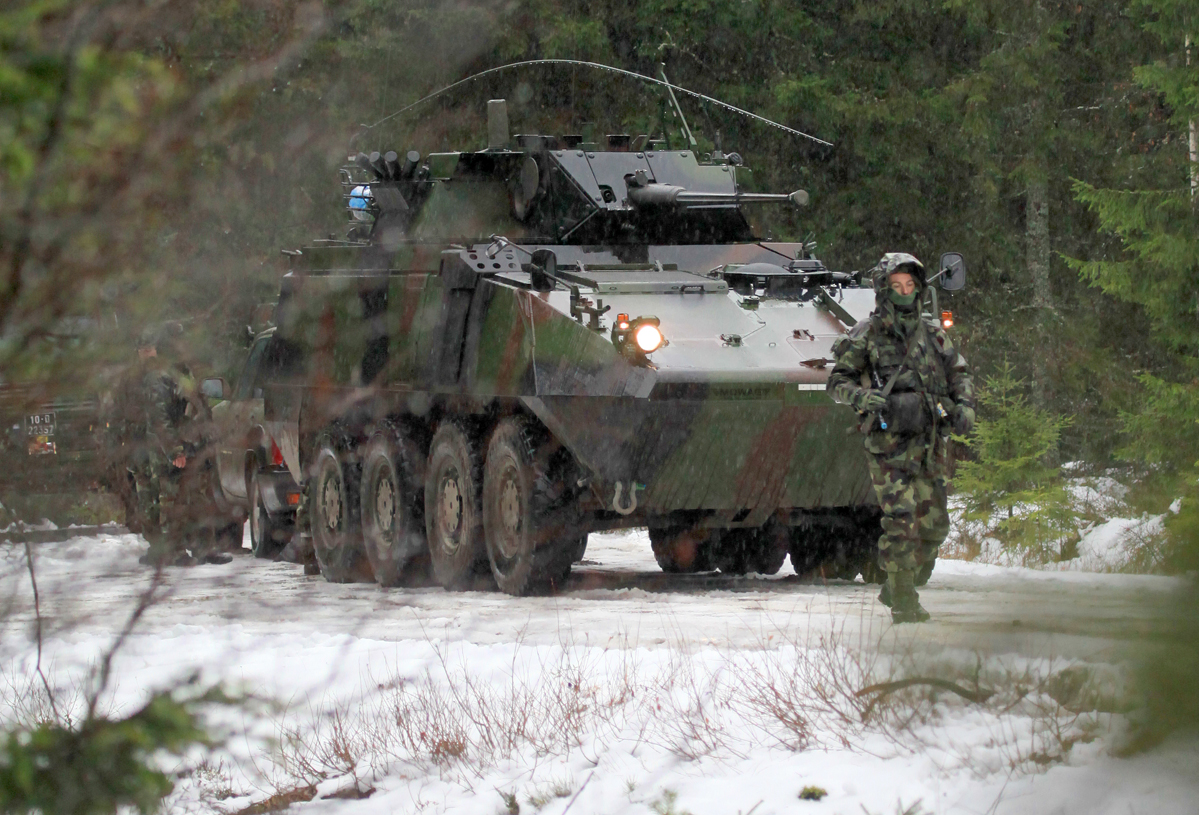
Irish Mowag Piranha IIIH

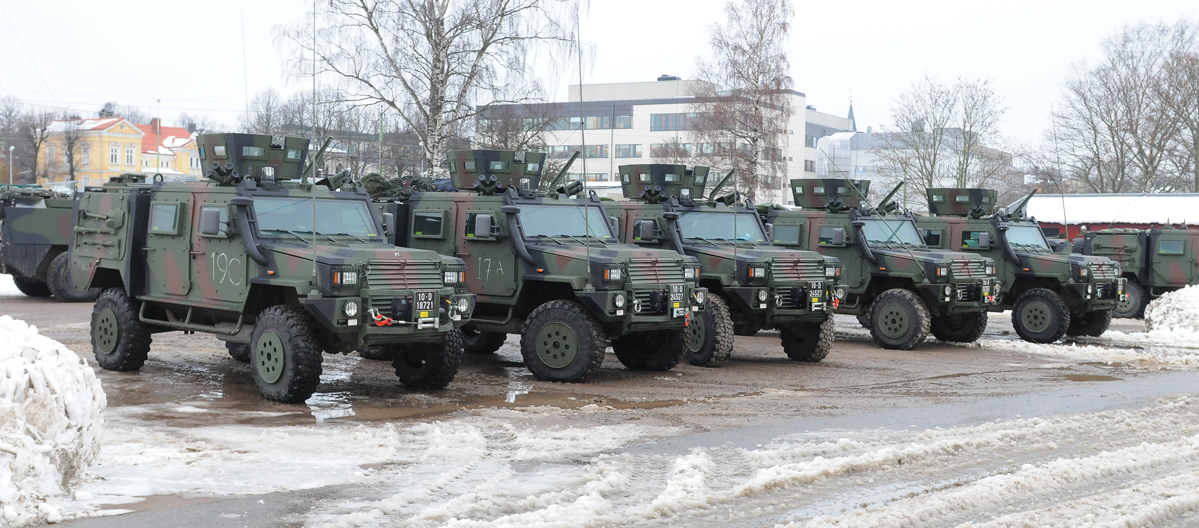
RG Outrider the Irish Defence Forces, a variant of the RG 32

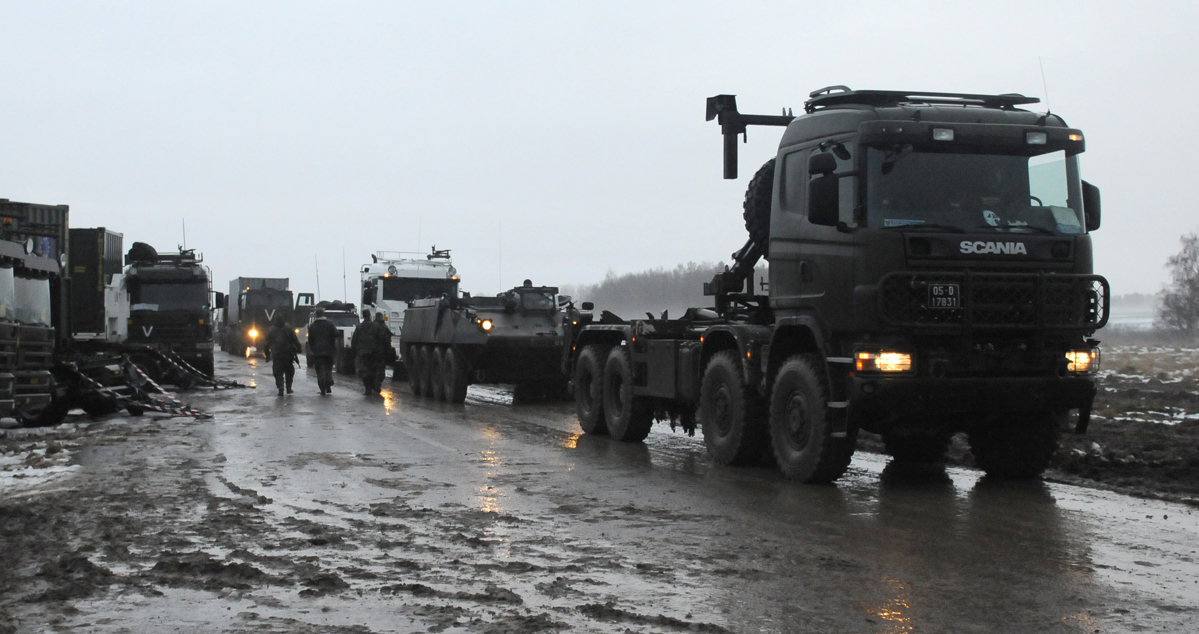
Scania P124CB 8x8 DROPS of the Irish Defence Forces

- Mowag Piranha (Armoured personnel carrier) Ireland
- Bandvagn 309 (Personnel carrier 309) Sweden
- RG 32 Galten (High Mobility Wheeled Vehicle) Sweden
- RG Outrider (Armoured personnel carrier) Ireland (also known as the RG-32M Light Tactical Armoured Vehicle)
- XA-203 SISU (Armoured Personnel carrier) Finland
- Mercedes-Benz G-Class (Softskin jeep) Finland
- XA-180 (Armoured Personnel carrier) Sweden, Finland, Estonia (XA-180EST)
- Strf 9040 / CV90 (Infantry Fighting Vehicle) Sweden (Only NBG08)
- Patria AMV Finland
- Scania P124CB 8x8 DROPS (Demountable Rack Offload and Pickup System) Ireland

=== Helicopters ===
- AgustaWestland AW109 (HKP 15)
- Mil Mi-17
- Sikorsky UH-60 Black Hawk

=== Aircraft ===
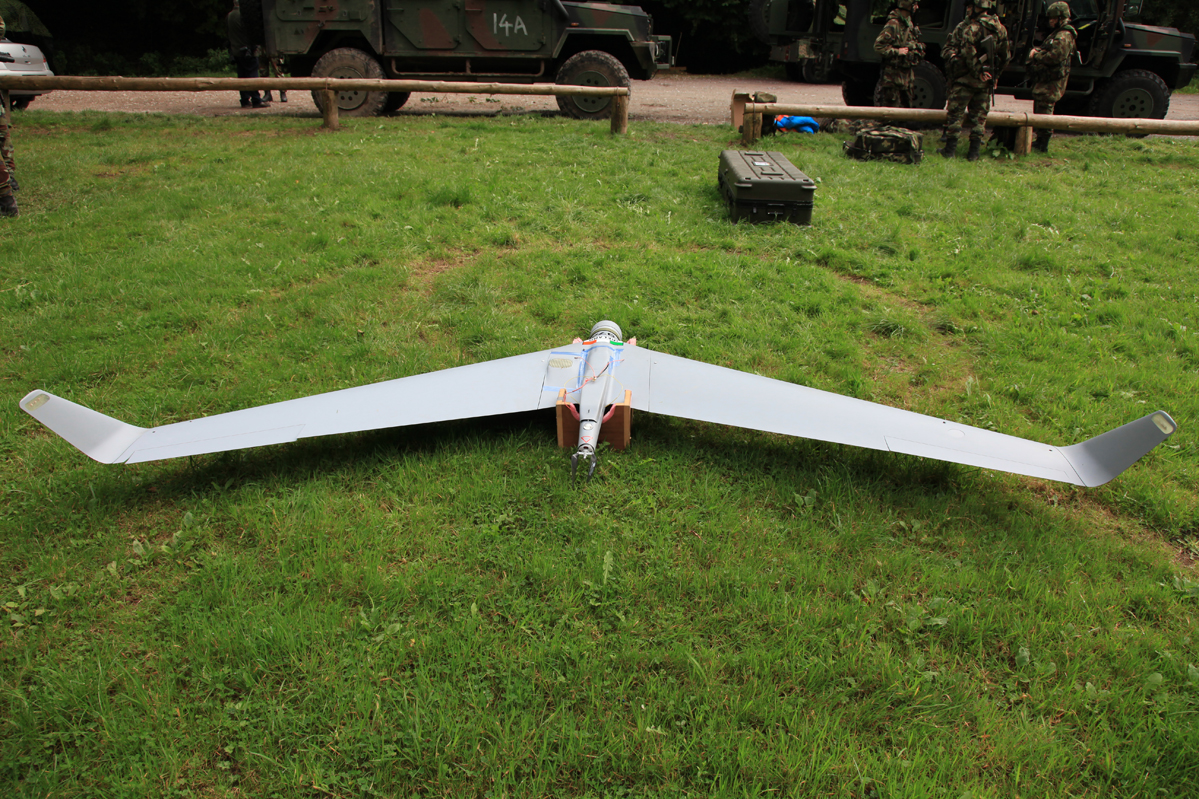
Aeronautics Orbiter UAV of the Irish Defence Forces

- JAS 39 Gripen - (Fighter aircraft)
- C-130 Hercules - (Military transport aircraft)
- F/A-18 Hornet - (Fighter aircraft)
- Aeronautics Orbiter UAV - (Unmanned aerial vehicle)

=== Small arms ===
- Ak 5 - assault rifle
- Rk 95 TP - assault rifle
- Steyr AUG - assault rifle
- HK416 - assault rifle
- Accuracy International Arctic Warfare - sniper rifle
- Sako TRG-42 - Multi-purpose sniper rifle
- Ksp 58 - general purpose machine gun
- Ksp 90 - light machine gun (SAW)
- PKM - Light machine gun
- Bofors AT4 - light anti-tank weapon
- NLAW - Smart anti-tank weapon
- Glock 17 - Pistol
- Glock 19 - Pistol
- MP5 - Sub-machine gun
- MP7 - Sub-machine gun

== Evaluation ==
On October 29, 2010 the findings of an official audit by the Swedish National Audit Office was published which concluded there were fundamental weaknesses in the organization's logistics capabilities, internal cooperation and personnel supply. According to the National Auditor, Jan Landahl, the Nordic Battlegroup also suffered from inadequate control over expenditures and reporting from the Government to the Riksdag was also unsatisfactory. The audit office's report found that twice as many Swedish soldiers were assigned to the Battlegroup compared to what the 2004 mandate had assigned, and the costs to the State was in the multiples of what the Riksdag had been told.

Previous Swedish Armed Force chief General Sverker Göranson advocated for a Nordic Battalion Force to be more narrowly focused on local defense.
