= Bengt Svensson =

Swedish Army officer (born 1958)

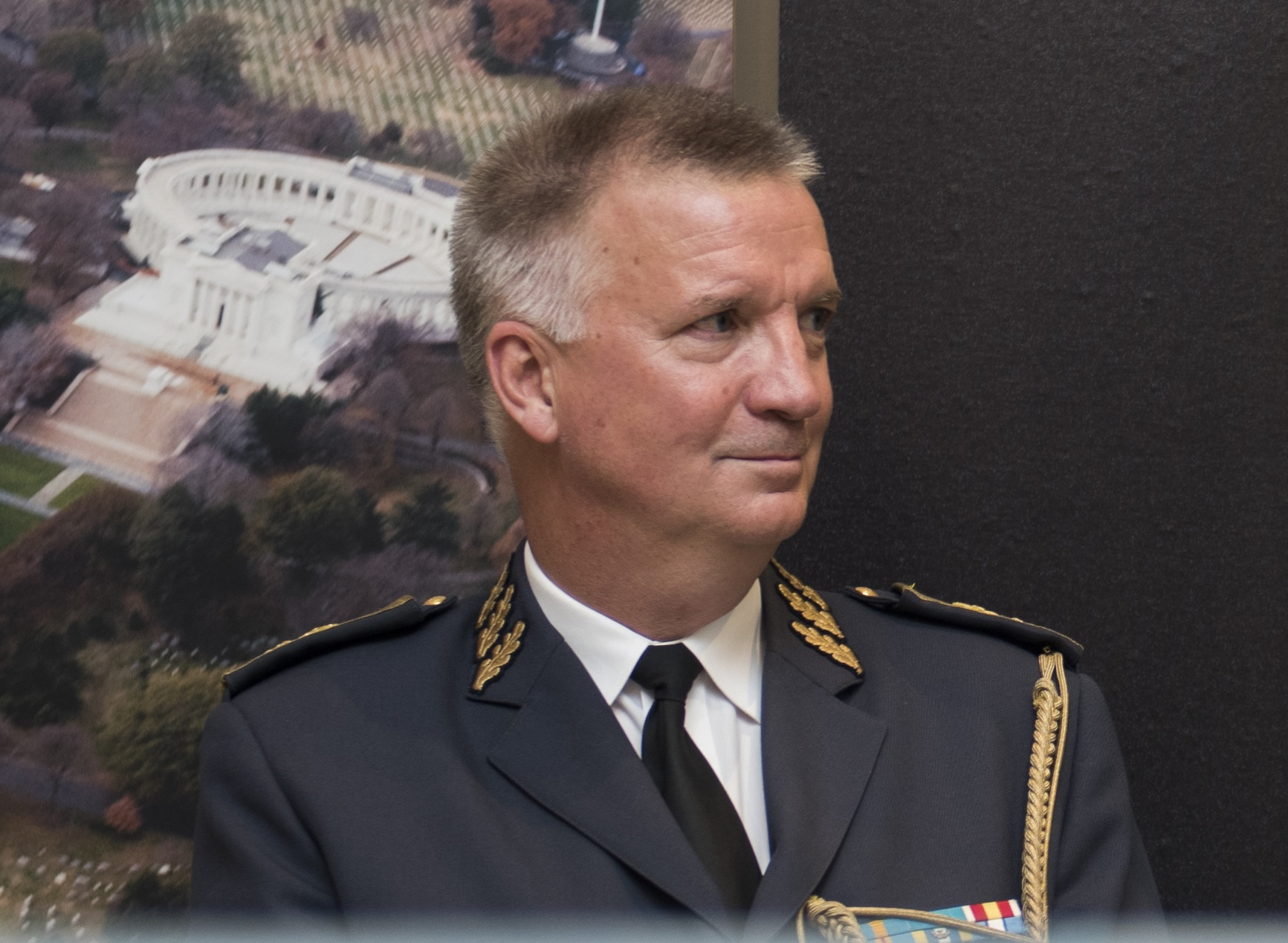
- Born: Bengt Allan Svensson; 24 February 1958 (age 68); Karlskrona, Sweden
- Military career
- Allegiance: Sweden
- Branch: Swedish Army
- Service years: 1982–2020
- Rank: Major General
- Units: LV 4 (1982–92); UNFICYP (1986); UNPROFOR (1995); Lv 6 (1998–00)
- Commands: CO Army Dept., PROD; Assistant Chief of Armed Forces Training & Procurement
- Conflicts: Cyprus dispute Yugoslav Wars

Major General Bengt Allan Svensson (born 24 February 1958) is a retired Swedish Army officer. Svensson served as Assistant Chief of Armed Forces Training & Procurement from 2012 to 2014.

== Career ==
Svensson was born on 24 February 1958 in Karlskrona, Sweden. He graduated from the Military Academy Karlberg in 1982 and was commissioned as an officer and assigned to the Scanian Anti-Aircraft Regiment in Ystad with the rank of fänrik. He was promoted to captain in 1983 and attended the Artillery and Engineering College in Stockholm from 1984 to 1985. He then served as platoon leader in Cyprus within the Swedish contingent of United Nations Peacekeeping Force in Cyprus (UNFICYP) in 1986. Svensson served as platoon leader in the Scanian Anti-Aircraft Regiment from 1986 to 1988 and attended the Tactical Course at the Swedish National Defence College from 1988 to 1989 when he was promoted to major.

Svensson served as second-in-command and company commander in the Scanian Anti-Aircraft Regiment from 1990 to 1992 and attended the Staff Course at the Swedish National Defence College from 1992 to 1994. He was posted as a staff officer in the Swedish Armed Forces Headquarters in Stockholm from 1994 to 1995 and then as a senior liaison officer and head of Section 5 in the Swedish battalion, part of United Nations Protection Force (UNPROFOR) in Bosnia and Herzegovina in 1995. From 1995 to 1996, Svensson was again posted as a staff officer in the Swedish Armed Forces Headquarters, and then from 1996 to 1997 as a staff officer in the Plans and Policy Directorate. He attended the United States Army Command and General Staff Officer Course at the United States Army Command and General Staff College from 1997 to 1998, thus obtaining a Master of Military Arts and Sciences (M.M.A.S.) degree from the United States Army Combined Arms Center.

In 1998, Svensson was promoted to lieutenant colonel and was assigned to Göta Anti-Aircraft Corps as battalion commander. After being promoted to colonel in 2000, Svensson served as chief of Combined Arms Section in the Development Department within the Army Tactical Command until 2002 and then as head of Development Department in the Army Tactical Command from 2002 to 2003. During this time, he attended the Integrated PfP-OSCE Course at the NATO Defense College in Rome, Italy in May 2001. From 2003 to 2006, he was posted to the Ministry of Defence's Department for International and Security Affairs as a military expert. From 2006 to 2009, Svensson served as army attaché and assistant defence attaché, at the Swedish Embassy in Washington, D.C. Svensson was promoted to brigadier general in 2009 whereupon from 2009 to 2012 he was head of the Army Department in the Training & Procurement Staff in the Swedish Armed Forces Headquarters. Svensson was promoted to major general in 2012, after which he served as Assistant Chief of Armed Forces Training & Procurement from 2012 to 2014. Between 1 January 2015 and 31 August 2020, he served as military attaché at the Swedish Embassy in Washington, D.C.

== Dates of rank ==
- 1982 – Second lieutenant
- 19?? – Lieutenant
- 1983 – Captain
- 1989 – Major
- 1998 – Lieutenant colonel
- 2000 – Colonel
- 2009 – Brigadier general
- 2012 – Major general

== Awards and decorations ==
=== Swedish ===
- (Sweden) Swedish Armed Forces Conscript Medal
- (Sweden) Swedish Armed Forces International Service Medal
- (Sweden) Scanian Anti-Aircraft Corps Commemorative Medal (Skånska luftvärnskåren minnesmedalj, SkånlvkSMM)
- (Sweden) Dalarna Brigade Medal of Merit (Dalabrigadens förtjänstmedalj, DalabrigDalabrigGM/SM/BM)
- (Sweden) Commemorative Medal of the Nobel Prize to the UN Peacekeeping Forces (Medaljen till minne av Nobels fredspris till FNs fredsbevarande styrkor, NobelFNSMM)

=== Foreign ===
- (United States) Legion of Merit (September 2012)
- United Nations Medal (UNFICYP) (1986)
- United Nations Medal (UNPROFOR) (1995)

== Honours ==
- Member of the Royal Swedish Academy of War Sciences (2005)

Military offices
Preceded by Gunnar Karlson	Assistant Chief of Armed Forces Training & Procurement; 2012–2014	Succeeded by Karl Engelbrektson
