= Österhaninge =

Place in Haninge Municipality, Stockholm County, Sweden

Coordinates: 59°7′32″N 18°10′15″E

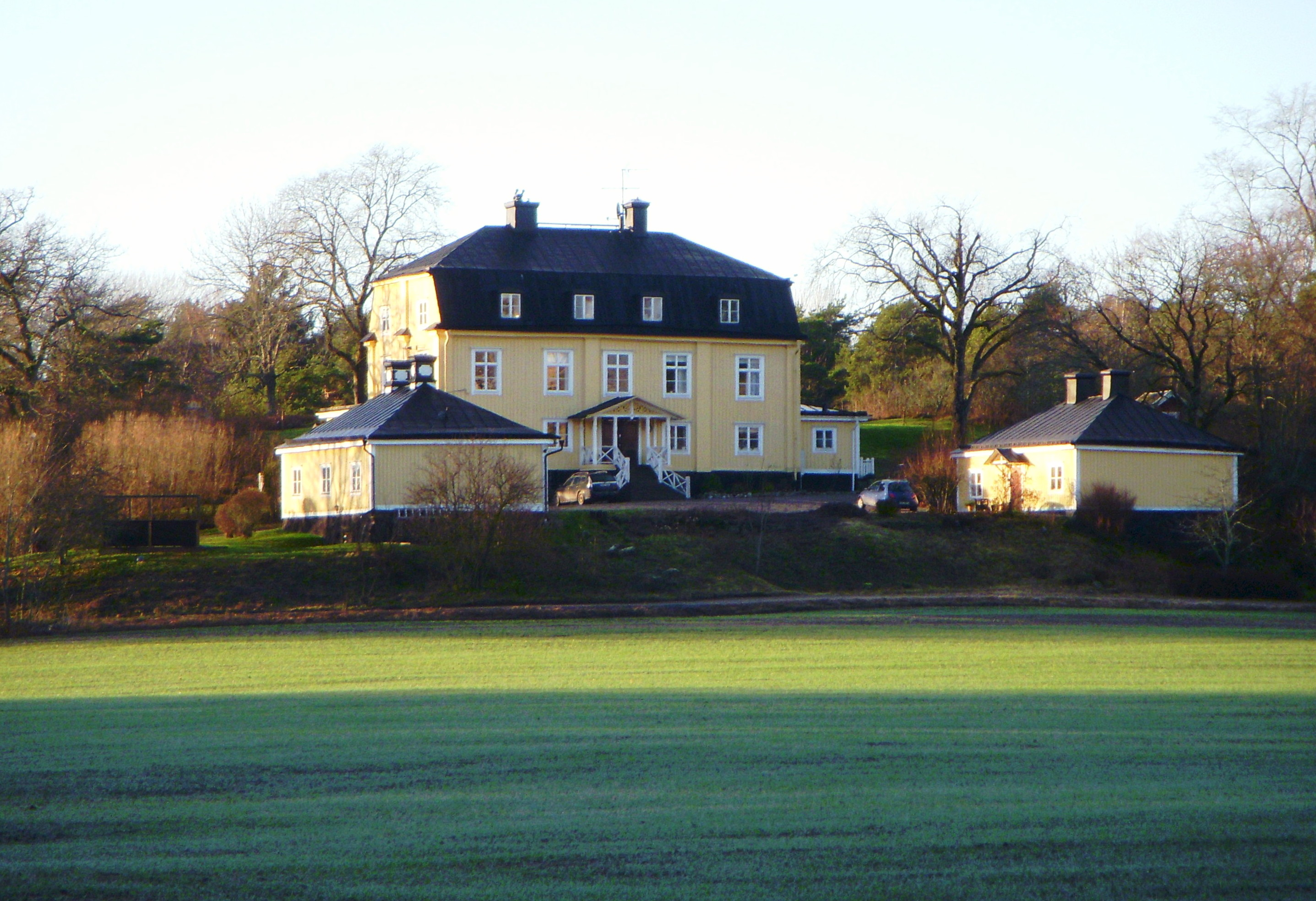
Hässlingeby Manor

Österhaninge (Swedish pronunciation: [œstɛrˈhânːɪŋɛ]) is an urban area located within Haninge Municipality in Stockholm County, Sweden.

It is the birthplace of former Prime Minister of Sweden Fredrik Reinfeldt, black metal frontman and vocalist Dead (Per Yngve Ohlin), and hockey player Kristian Huselius.
