= Siege of Fredriksodde =

1657 Dano-Swedish War siege

- Part of the Dano-Swedish War (1657–1658)
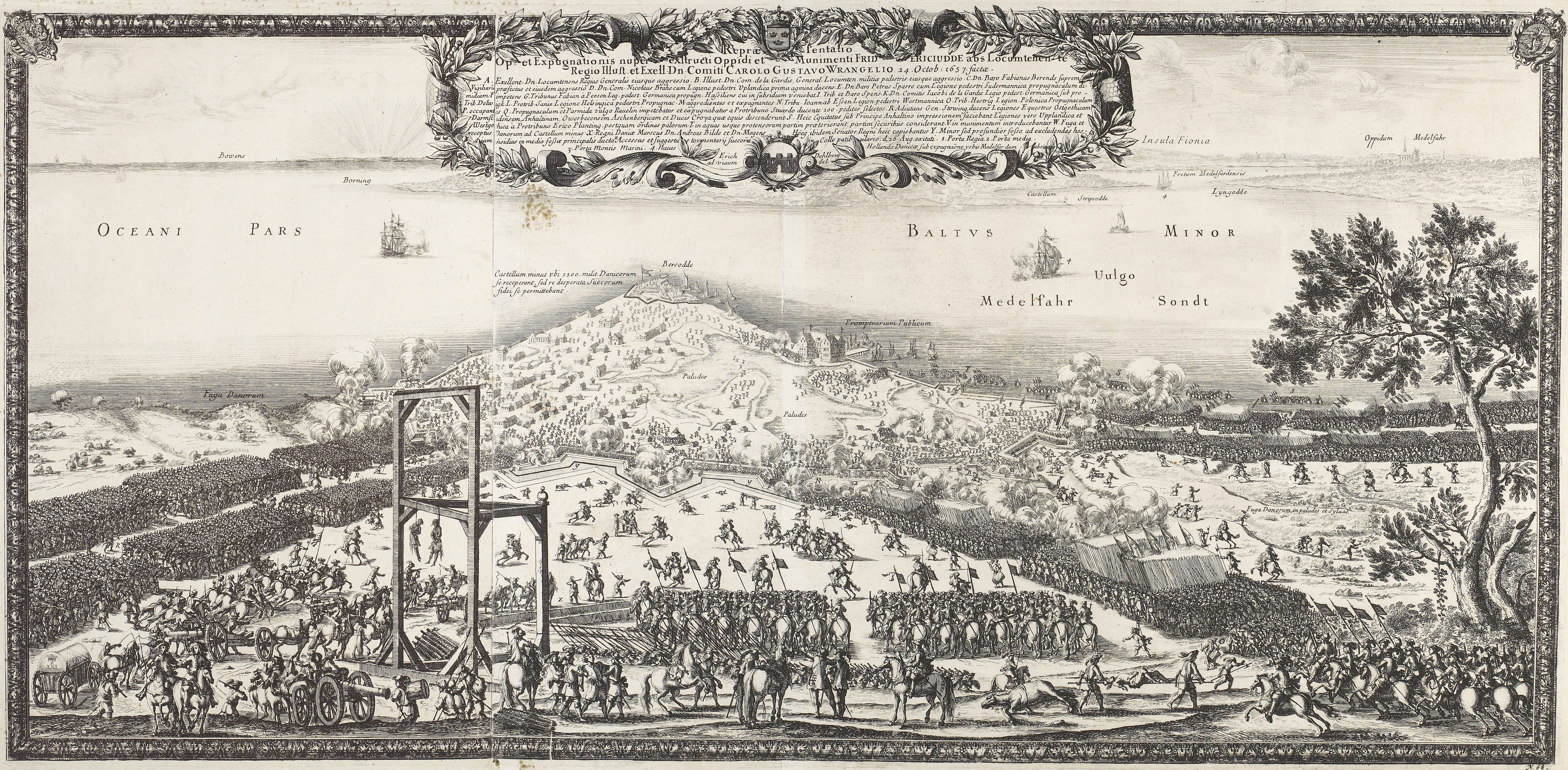
- Engraving of the siege of Fredriksodde by Erik Dahlbergh
| Date | 25 August – 24 October 1657 |
| Location | Fredriksodde (modern day Fredericia), Denmark 55°34′N 9°45′E |
| Result | Swedish victory |
| Territorial changes | Fredriksodde and the rest of Jutland falls into Swedish control |

Belligerents
| (yes) Swedish Empire | Denmark–Norway |

Commanders and leaders
| (yes) Carl Gustaf Wrangel (yes) Erik Dahlbergh (yes) Fabian von Fersen (yes) Jacob Kasimir De la Gardie (yes) Fabian Berendes | Anders Bille (DOW); Eiler Holck (surrendered); Måns Höök (POW); Linderoth †; Poul Beenfeldt |

Units involved
| Uppland Regiment; Hälsinge Regiment; Stenbocks Brigade; Närke-Värmland Regiment; Södermanland Regiment; Västgöta Regiment | Fredriksodde garrison Marshal's life regiment Old Jutish Regiment |

Strength
| At the outset 5,000 soldiers 2,000 cavalry Later; 8,000 men | At the outset 6,000 men Later; 3,000 men |

Casualties and losses
| 56–244 killed 188–195 wounded | 1,000–2,300 killed 2,000 captured 73–80 guns |

The siege of Fredriksodde, also known as the Storming of Fredriksodde (Swedish: Stormningen av Frederiksodde; Danish: Stormen på Frederiksodde) and the conquest of Fredriksodde (Swedish: Erövringen av Fredriksodde), was a successful Swedish siege of the fortress and town of Fredriksodde (modern day Fredericia) in 1657 during the Dano-Swedish War of 1657–1658. The siege and the subsequent capture of the fortress by Swedish forces completed the Swedish conquest of Jutland.

== Background ==
On 17 August, Charles X Gustav ordered Karl Magnus to go northwards to determine exactly how strongly Fredriksodde was defended. According to the king's information, the fortress was garrisoned with 4,000 mustered peasants, of whom only 1,000 had any weapons at all. Johan Gorries Gorgas and Erik Dahlbergh were also instructed to inspect Fredriksodde. From these reports, Charles decided to "unceremoniously" storm the fortress.

== Siege ==
On 25 August, the main Swedish Army arrived at Fredriksodde, and after a council of war, they decided to delay the assault as the defenses were stronger than they anticipated, and in a letter from 27 August, Charles described having seen the fortress and deciding to not "risk our people in a storming". Nils Brahe gives a similar answer who, in a letter he wrote on the same day, reported from "the fort of Fredrichsudd" that "we had intended to storm it as we had done yesterday, but since the place is strong and well-manned, we found it unwise'".

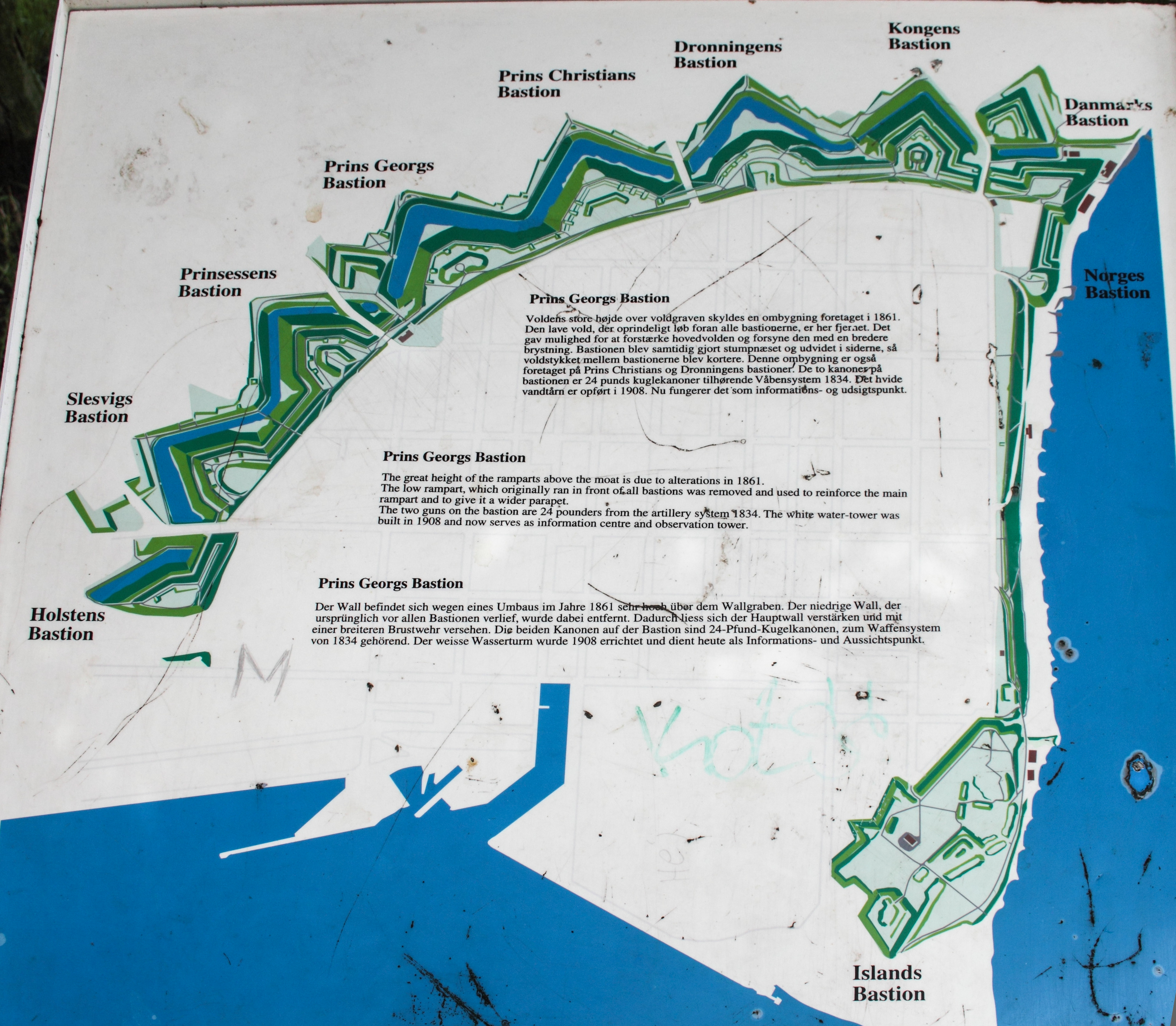
Map of Frederiksodde's bastions

Charles was furious with what he thought were overly casual reports that he had received about the fortress before his arrival. Therefore, he ordered the army to prepare for an assault before the preparations were cancelled. During this, the Danish garrison bombarded the Swedes, which further contributed to the Swedes postponing the assault.

In the beginning, when the Swedish army had recently arrived to Fredriksodde, King Frederick III, along with the Colonels Sehested and Rantzau, attempted a sortie with 400 cavalry but were repelled due to being overwhelmed. At that point, Frederick quickly decided to leave the fortress for the Danish islands. During the following period, more sorties would occur, although they all failed.

On the same day as the attempted sortie, Charles X Gustav arrived to the fortress with the rest of the Swedish army and arranged the regiments around the fortress. After expressing his desire for an immediate assault, Wrangel convinced him to wait until the Danes were weakened. Charles instead put two 12-pounders and four 6-pounder cannons at Galgberget, and by Rackarkulan, he placed four 12-pounders and two 24-pounders.

As soon as the sun rose on the following day, the Swedes began bombarding the fortress. This was met with the Danish fire from inside, consisting of 12 batteries with 23 cannons. The Danish bombardment was effective and the Swedish artillery suffered heavy casualties. After around three hours, the Swedes ended their bombardment.

Due to the heavy losses sustained, Wrangel pulled the army back to Bredstrup. The Swedish camp suffered from freezing and starving while the Danish defenders were somewhat dry and secure behind the walls, as long they had enough supplies. In order to defend their camp, the Swedes established a cavalry guard some two kilometers away from the city, which guarded the way to it.

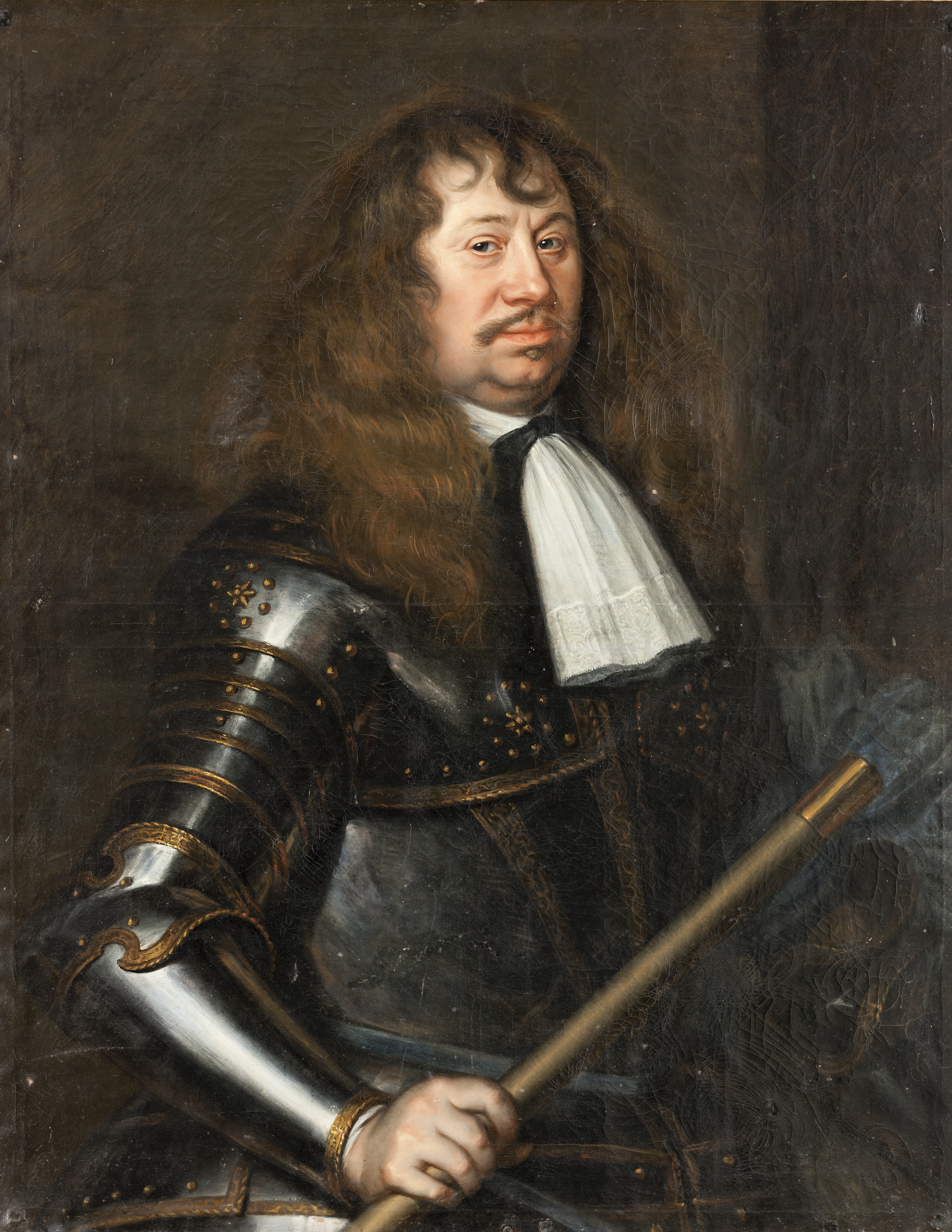
Portrait of Carl Gustaf Wrangel by Matthaeus Merian the Younger

The confidence of the defenders was strengthened when the Swedes became hesitant to storm, especially after they received reports of Charles X Gustav departing to Wismar. Due to this, command was given to Carl Gustaf Wrangel. As a result of the siege, the defenders were completely cut off from the rest of Jutland, but they maintained an important opening to Fyn, from where they received fresh supplies and troops.

The Swedish navy was tasked with cutting communication across the Little Belt in order to prevent reinforcements from reaching Jutland. Charles assumed that it would be possible to capture Fredriksodde after this had been achieved.

In autumn, Wrangel received reinforcements consisting of the 2,500 Swedes who had survived the siege of Kraków. Erik Dahlbergh, along with Lieutenant Colonel Sahnitz and Adjutant general Stöwing were ordered to do reconnaissance on the fortress to see if the Swedes would be able to storm the fortress. According to Dahlbergh, the reconnaissance revealed that there was a weakpoint in the fortress wall in the south-west where the defenses only consisted of three rows of wooden palisades and a low waterline, with no proper moat, which was where the Swedes chose to strike.

On 22 October, three more infantry regiments arrived to the Swedish army under Generalmajor Fabian von Fersen. On the same day, an exchange of prisoners also occurred. On 23 October, a council of war was held by Wrangel and it was at this point that the Swedes decided to attempt a storming of the fortress.

During the siege, the Danish garrison had slowly become weaker. Originally, the garrison consisted of more than 6,000 men. However, many of the Danes had deserted, and in mid-October, almost 500 were sick. On the morning of the Swedish storming, the effective defense of Fredriksodde had shrunk to some 3,000 men. Although this is also contested, with Wrangel himself claiming that the Danish garrison had around 5,000 men, Danish sources claim that it was no larger than 1,000 soldiers, 2,000 armed peasants and 400 burghers.

== Storming ==
As a result of the reconnaissance, Wrangel decided to split the storming into three columns. Wrangel would lead the first, Lieutenant General Jacob Kasimir De la Gardie leading the second, and the third being led by Generalmajor Fabian Berendes.

Illustration of the storming by Erik Dahlbergh

Around one o'clock at night on 24 October, the Swedish army of 8,000 men was assembled for the assault. The Swedes refrained from artillery preparations to surprise the Danes. Instead, 79 artillerymen were to go to the walls with handgrenades to throw at the defenders and clear the path for the assault troops.

At two o'clock, Wrangel arrived and rode along the Swedish line and shouted encouraging words to the officers and soldiers. He bore a bundle of straws on his left arm since it was a common identification mark that all Swedes were supposed to wear to minimize friendly fire. At the end of his speech, Wrangel informed everyone that the warcry during the storming would be "Help Jesus!".

In Eritsö nearby to Fredriksodde, the Swedes filled a house with flammable materials, and when the house was lit on fire, it was their signal to attack. The Swedes moved forward and stood in front of the Danish ramparts after 45 minutes.

=== First column ===
The first Swedish column, led by Carl Gustaf Wrangel, stormed the palisades at Adelns bastion with four infantry regiments along the closeby half bastion, and the Oldenburg bastion. In the lead, 13 carpenters chopped holes in the palisades and after them, 40 men with 150 grenades and 50 soldiers under a major followed. They were ordered to march over the bastion closest to the water. After them, the Uppland Regiment under Colonel Nils Brahe, along with the Hälsinge Regiment led by Colonel Per Larsson Sparre advanced.

Last in the column, Stenbocks Brigade, led by Colonel Spens and a German force under Generalmajor Fabian von Fersen advanced forwards. These brigades had the task of departing from the main column and attacking the Holstein Bastion in order to capture it.

Johan Georg von Anhalt, along with 24 cavalry companies, exploited the shallow surrounding waters of the Little Belt, bypassed the Danish lines. As a result, they managed to enter the city itself and causing panic in the defenders with their resistance quickly falling apart.

=== Second column ===
The second column, commanded by Lieutenant General Jacob Kasimir De la Gardie, attacked the Mittlager port, along with Billes, Prins Georg, Prinsporten, Prinsessan, and Herrarnas bastions. In the front, his German infantry regiment commanded by Lieutenant Colonel Delwig advanced. Behind them, the Södermanland infantry brigade under the command of Lieutenant Colonel Berendt Sahnitz advanced, followed by Johan von Essen's Värmland-Närke infantry brigade. A German and Polish brigade under Colonel Hestrig formed the reserve. When the Swedes reached the ramparts, they were halted before the collapse of the Danish line further south caused the defenders in this section of the rampart to flee.

=== Third column ===
The third column, led by Generalmajor Fabian Berendes, attacked Kongeporten and Dronningens bastions along with a nearby curtain wall. This column consisted of redirected cavalry led by Adjutant general from Berndes regiment, Galles Finnish cavalry, Småland cavalry, Södermanlanders, and five German cavalry regiments. 200 musketeers were sent and provided supporting fire for the Swedes. The Danish resistance was particularly stubborn with the Swedes encountering Marskens Livregemente under Lieutenant Colonel Eiler Holck, however, the defenders here would also give up after the Swedes managed to break through at the southern shore.

Anders Bille, who had been seriously wounded along with any surviving Danish soldiers, retreated into the Berfodde castle at the tip of the cape in order to attempt escaping over to Fyn. Near the Trinitatis Cemetery, pursuing Swedish soldiers killed straggling dragoons from the Marshal's regiment. After two hours of fighting at around seven o'clock, Fredriksodde was under Swedish control. The remaining Danes made a final attempt to evacuate Bille over to Fyn, but their attempt failed.

Continued resistance was futile, the Swedes had at this point captured the entire fortress in exception to the citadel on Bers Odde, which had already been surrounded, with nobody being able to get out. In order to prevent further bloodshed, Wrangel sent Erik Dahlbergh into the citadel in order to convince Bille to surrender. To capitulate a fortress was a crime if there was no good reason to do so, but Bille believed that he had good reasons to capitulate and that nobody would criticize him for doing so.

After half an hour of fighting, Bille finally gave up, and 2,300 unarmed Danes marched out. Bille himself would die of his wounds after a long conversation with Wrangel. Ulfeldt attempted to take part in it but was told off by Bille, since he didn't want to speak with him. After Bille's death, the Närke-Värmland Regiment went into the citadel, plundering it.

== Aftermath ==
The loss of Fredriksodde shocked the Danes, who blamed it on treason. Public anger, fuelled by propagandists who wanted to shift the blame from Frederick III, accused the dead Bille of the disaster and had him sentenced to death posthumously. After the Swedes returned Bille's corpse to Fyn with full honours after the battle, the court interpreted it as proof of Bille's treason. Moreover, two Danes who had served at Fredriksodde, a lieutenant and a corporal respectively, but who were later discovered with the Swedes, were quickly convicted and executed for treason.

Wrangel was satisfied with his "härliga viktorie" (Lovely victory), and the king was very satisfied. As appreciation for his contributions, Wrangel was promoted to Rear Admiral and lawman over Uppland.

The Swedish victory at Fredriksodde completed the Swedish conquest of Jutland, although the Danes still held Fyn.

=== Casualties ===
The exact casualties suffered by both sides is uncertain. Historian Michael Fredholm von Essen estimated the number of Danes killed at 1,000 men, while historian Lars Ericson Wolke estimated it at 1,100 men. Danish historian Ole Dyrn gave an estimate of between 1,100 and 2,300 killed, with historian Peter Englund agreeing with the latter estimate. Another 2,000 Danes were captured.

In addition to these losses, the Danes lost between 33 to 37 standards, and between 73 to 80 guns.

As for Swedish losses, an estimate of 56 men killed was given by historian Claes-Göran Isacson. However, other historians gave an estimate of 75 or 244 killed. As for the number of men wounded, Isacson gave an estimate of 188, and others gave an estimate of 195.

Swedish losses were most likely higher, as many Swedish units had a high number of soldiers who were unfit for duty in the following period.

According to Danish research, the Danish losses were much smaller.

== See also ==
- March Across the Belts – Swedish military campaign
- Battle of Nabe – Battle between Swedish and Danish forces
- Battle of Fredericia – Battle Between Schleswig Holstein and Denmark

== Works cited ==
- Wolke, Lars Ericson (2014). 1658: Tåget över bält [1658: March across the Belts] (in Swedish). Historiska Media. ISBN 9789187031984.
- von Essen, Michael Fredholm (2023). Charles X's Wars: Volume 3 - The Danish Wars, 1657-1660. Helion & Company. ISBN 9781915113603.
- Isacson, Claes-Göran (2015). Karl X Gustavs krig: Fälttågen i Polen, Tyskland, Baltikum, Danmark och Sverige 1655-1660 [Wars of Charles X Gustav: The campaigns in Poland, Germany, the Baltics, Denmark and Sweden 1655-1660] (in Swedish). Historiska Media. ISBN 9789175450117.
- Sundberg, Ulf (2010). Sveriges krig 1630-1814 [Sweden's wars 1630–1814] (in Swedish). Svenskt militärhistoriskt bibliotek. ISBN 9789185789634.
- Englund, Peter (2000). Den oövervinnerlige: om den svenska stormaktstiden och en man i dess mitt [The invincible: about the era of Swedish great power and a man in its midst] (in Swedish). Atlantis. ISBN 9789174869996.
- Dyrn, Ole (2007). "Stormen på Frederiksodde 1657" [Storming of Fredriksodde 1657] (PDF). slaegtsbibliotek.dk (in Danish). Danske Slægtsforskeres Bibliotek.
- Asker, Björn (3 February 2015). Karl X Gustav: En biografi [Charles X Gustav: A biography] (in Swedish). Historiska Media. ISBN 9789187263057.
