= North Scanian Regiment =

Former Swedish military unit

- Norra skånska regementet
- Active: 1963–1994
- Country: Sweden
- Allegiance: Swedish Armed Forces
- Branch: Swedish Army
- Type: Armoured
- Size: Regiment
- Part of: I Military District (1963–1966); Southern Military District (1966–1994)
- Garrison/HQ: Kristianstad
- Nickname: Norringarna
- Mottos: Ära, skyldighet, vilja ("Honor, duty, will")
- Colors: Yellow and red-violet
- March: "På marsch" (Rydberg) (Note: The march was adopted by the North Scanian Infantry Regiment and established in 1953 by Army Order 33/1953. It was used by the North Scanian Regiment from 1963 to 1994, and by the Southern Military District from 1994 to 2000, and by the Southern Military District from 2000 to 2005.)
- Anniversaries: 13 September (Battle of Jutas)

Insignia
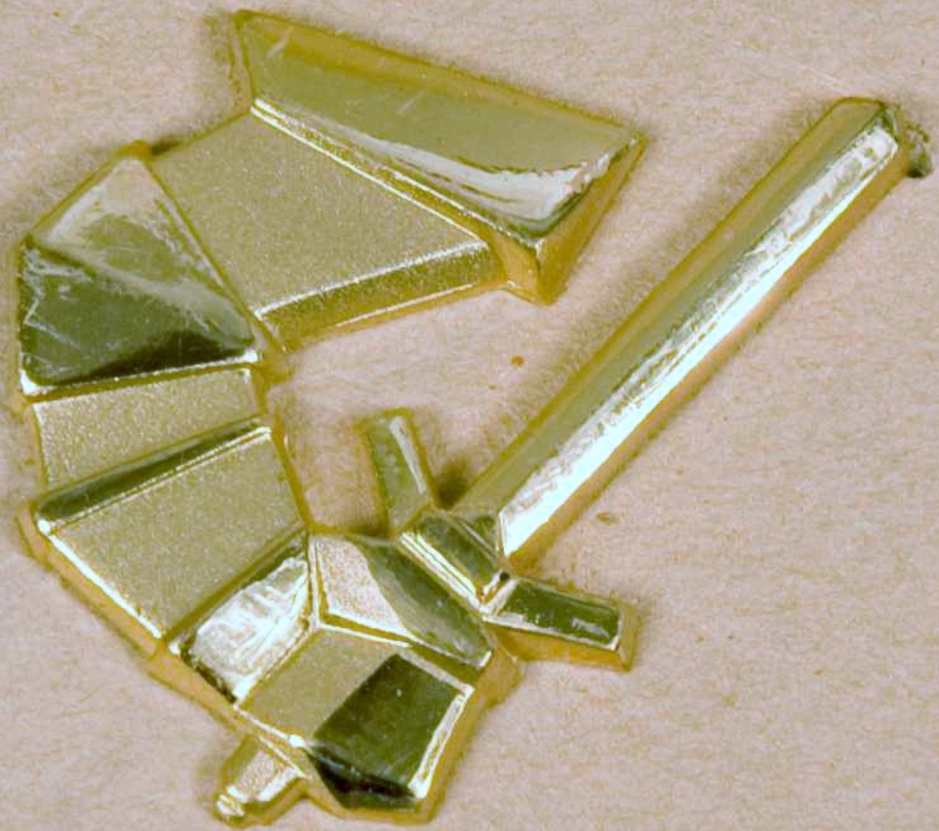
- Branch insignia m/1963

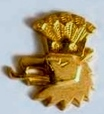
- Unit insignia m/1960

North Scanian Regiment (Swedish: Norra skånska regementet), designation P 6/Fo 14, was a Swedish Army armoured regiment that operated from 1963 to 1994. The unit was based in the Kristianstad Garrison in Kristianstad. The unit was formed in 1963 when North Scanian Infantry Regiment (I 6) was converted from an infantry regiment to and armoured regiment.

== History ==
In connection with the Defence Act of 1958, the Riksdag decided that eight armored brigades with new combat vehicles should be organized within the Swedish Army, a decision that for economic reasons changed in August 1960 to include only seven armored brigades. Which infantry regiment would receive the 7th Brigade was a battle that came to an end between the North Scanian Infantry Regiment (I 6) and Älvsborg Regiment (I 15). Given that the Älvsborg Regiment has since 1949 trained armored infantry for both the Älvsborg Brigade (Älvsborgsbrigaden, PB 5) and the Skaraborg Brigade (PB 9), the regiment should have been closest at hand. However, on 9 January 1962, the Chief of the Army, Lieutenant General Thord Bonde announced that the North Scanian Infantry Regiment would be reorganized into an armored regiment, and that PB 5 should be disbanded as an armored brigade by 1968. That it became the North Scanian Infantry Regiment which was reorganized into an armored regiment was largely due to the Älvsborg Regiment not suitable for combat vehicle training. Thus, the North Scanian Regiment (P 6) was formed on 1 April 1963.

From the beginning, it was intended that the Scanian Brigade (Skånebrigaden, IB 37) at the North Scanian Infantry Regiment should be reorganized into armored brigade and given the designation PB 37, and that a 4th Armoured Brigade in Scania would be designated PB 26. However, the proposal fell due to that the Scanian Brigade's mobilization area was east of Ringsjön, too far from the regiment in Kristianstad. No 4th Armoured Brigade was ever raised, but it was Kristianstad Brigade (IB 26) that was reorganized into the armoured brigade PB 26. The reason why the brigade did not become PB 6 was because that designation was already occupied by the Blue Brigade (PB 6).

The disbandment of the regiment began on 1 July 1992. Between 31 January 1993 and 1 February 1993, the regiment attended its last Royal Guards at Stockholm Palace. On 14 May 1993, a farewell parade was conducted through Kristianstad, which was followed in the same month with the last military discharge. In the summer of 1993, an acknowledgment of the regiment's staff was carried out. On 1 July 1993, only parts of the regiment remained, such as the defence district staff. On 30 June 1994, the North Scanian Regiment was disbanded. And on 1 July 1994, the Scanian Dragoon Regiment (Skånska dragonregementet, P 2) was reorganized from a training regiment to a defence district regiment (försvarsområdesregemente), and was given the overall mobilization responsibility within Kristianstad Defence District (Kristianstads försvarsområde, Fo 14), which was marked with the new name North Scanian Dragoon Regiment (Norra Skånska dragonregementet, P 2/Fo 14).

== Units ==
=== Kristianstad Brigade ===
Kristianstad Brigade (Kristianstadsbrigaden, PB 26) was formed in 1949 as an infantry brigade and originated from the field regiment raised by the Defence Act of 1942. When the infantry regiments were raised as field regiments, the North Scanian Regiment organized two field regiments (war units), the North Scanian Regiment (I 6) and Kristianstad Regiment (I 36). The Defence Act of 1948 introduced brigades throughout the army, which resulted in the army being streamlined into two brigade types, infantry brigades and armoured brigades. However, in the North Scanian Regiment, only one field regiment came to be reorganized into infantry brigade, when Kristianstad Regiment (I 36) was disbanded. At that time, the brigade was the only brigade of the regiment and was named IB 26, and was organized according to the unit types of IB 49, IB 59. In connection with the brigade becoming an armoured brigade in 1963, the new designation was PB 26. The brigade was disbanded together with the regiment on 30 June 1994. The 2nd Mechanized Battalion (2. mekaniserade bataljonen) at the brigade was transferred to the South Scanian Brigade (Södra skånska brigaden, MekB 7) after the disbandment.

=== Swedish Army School of Photography ===
The Swedish Army School of Photography (Arméns fotoskola, FotoS), nicknamed the Ökenfortet ("Desert Fort"), was a school within the army that was formed on 1 April 1957. The school annually trained about 20 photo technicians and 40-50 army photographers. The school's conscripts belonged to a peace-time unit that raised a war-time unit which included photo groups or photo sections. On 30 June 1974, the school was disbanded.

=== Mechanics School ===
The Mechanics School (Mekanikerskolan, MekS) was an army school and part of the unit's technical department. The school was built in Kristianstad in August 1984 and was located in the schoolhouse, or building 130. The school was organized in four educational programs, the Combat Vehicle Program, the Turret Program, the Telephone Program and the Vehicle Program. The Combat Vehicle Program trained conscripts, technical officers and workshop personnel on Stridsvagn 104 and Pansarbandvagn 302. The Turret Program trained conscripts (from P 4, P 6, P 10 and P 18), technical officers and workshop personnel on the weapon systems of Stridsvagn 104, Pansarbandvagn 302 and firearms. The Telephone Program trained conscript mechanics in the entire Southern Military District. The Vehicle Program was located at Wendes Artillery Regiment in Norra Åsum, and trained conscript mechanics (from A 3, I 11, I 12, Ing 2, Lv 4 and P 6) on all types of off-road vehicles.

=== Companies ===
1970s

1. Life Company Villand and Norra Åsbo
2. Östra Göinge and Harjager
3. Västra Göinge and Gärds
4. Södra Åsbo
5. Frosta (disbanded in 1952)
6. Rönnebergs
7. Luggude
8. Onsjö and Frosta
9. Frosta (renamed Frosta Company in 1952 and disbanded in 1967)

1990s

1. Life Company (officer training)
2. Norra Åsbo Company (staff and signals)
3. Västra Göinge Company (student and later weapons training and armoured reconnaissance training)
4. Gärds Company (depot)
5. Not used
6. Rönnebergs Company (tank training)
7. Luggude Company (mechanised infantry)
8. Onsjö Company (logistics)

== Barracks and training areas ==
=== Barracks ===
In the early 1920s, a new barracks establishment was erected in Kristianstad. The establishment was erected after the 1901 Defence Reform's building program after the Barracks Building Committee's (Kasernbyggnadsnämnden) second series of type establishments for the infantry. The regiment moved into the barracks area in October 1920, and ceremony was held on 18 May 1923. After the regiment was reorganized into an armored unit, several new buildings were erected in connection with the barracks area. A total of 130 buildings were built. When the regiment was disbanded, the entire area was sold in 1993 to the National Swedish Board of Public Building (Byggnadsstyrelsen), and in 1994 the area was completely abandoned. Since 1995, Kristianstad University has been housed within the former barracks area.

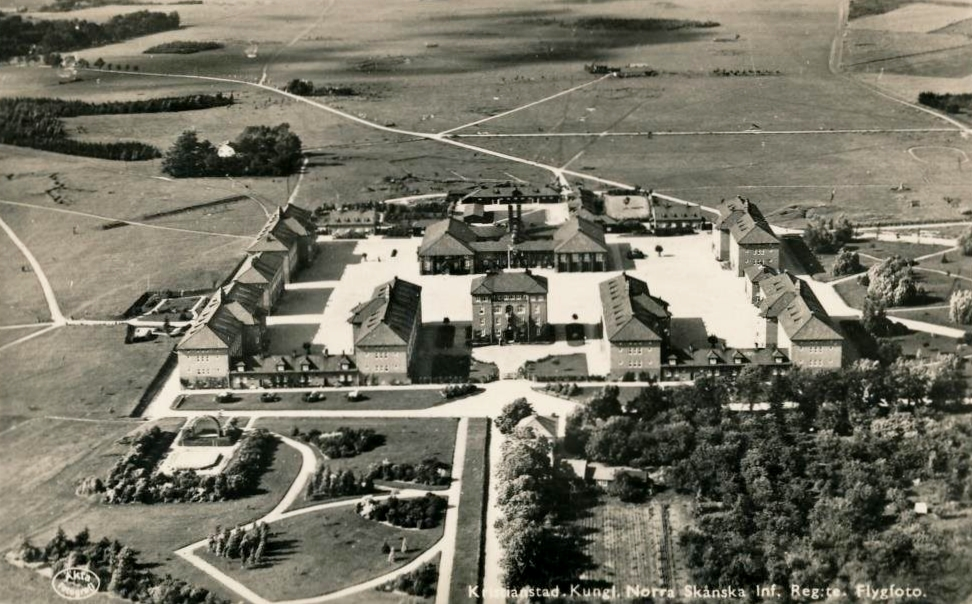
View of the regiment's barracks in Näsby.

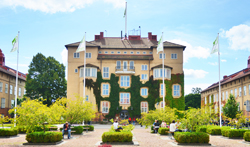
The former chancellery building of the regiment.

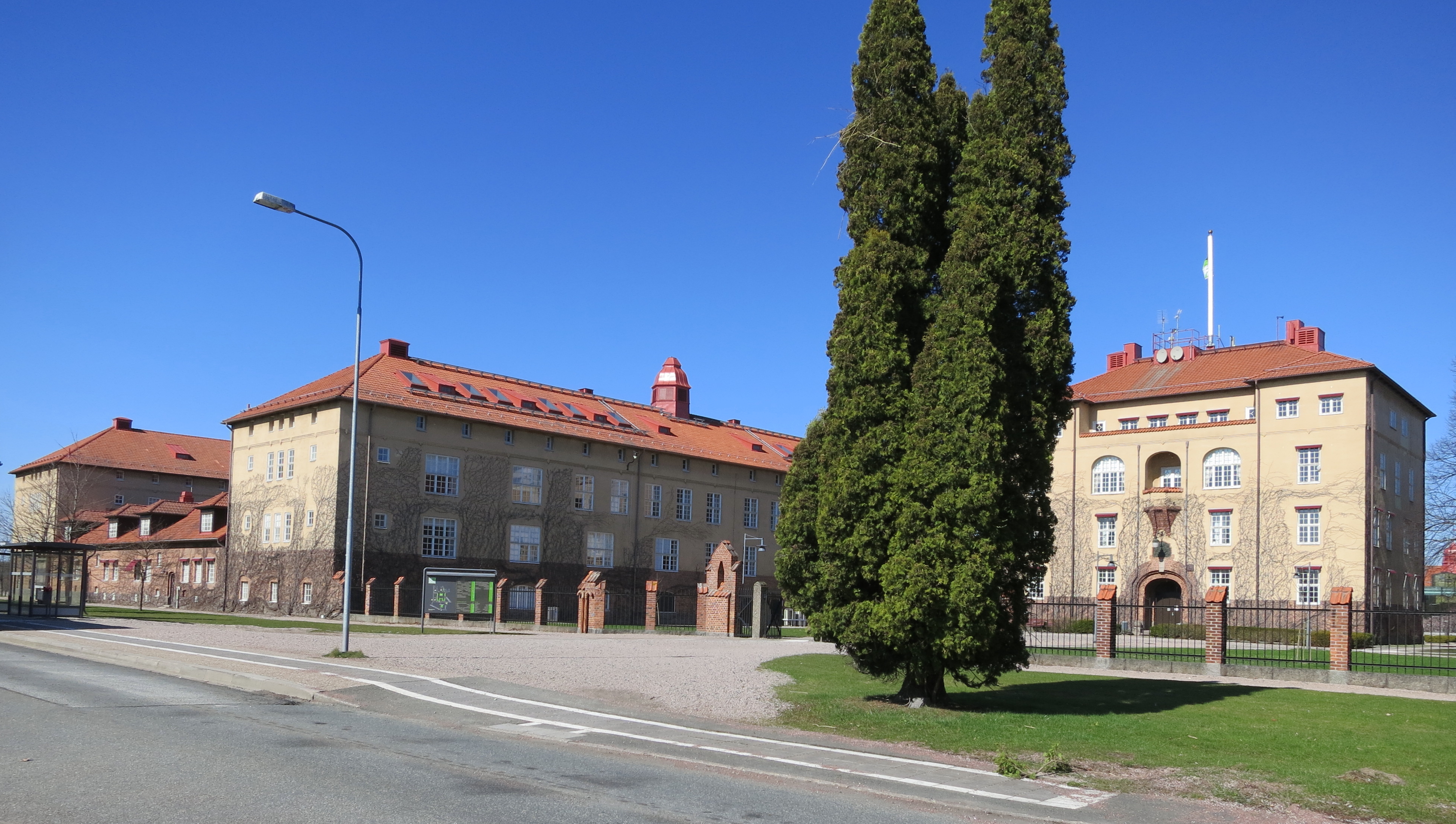
Part of the regiment's former barracks.

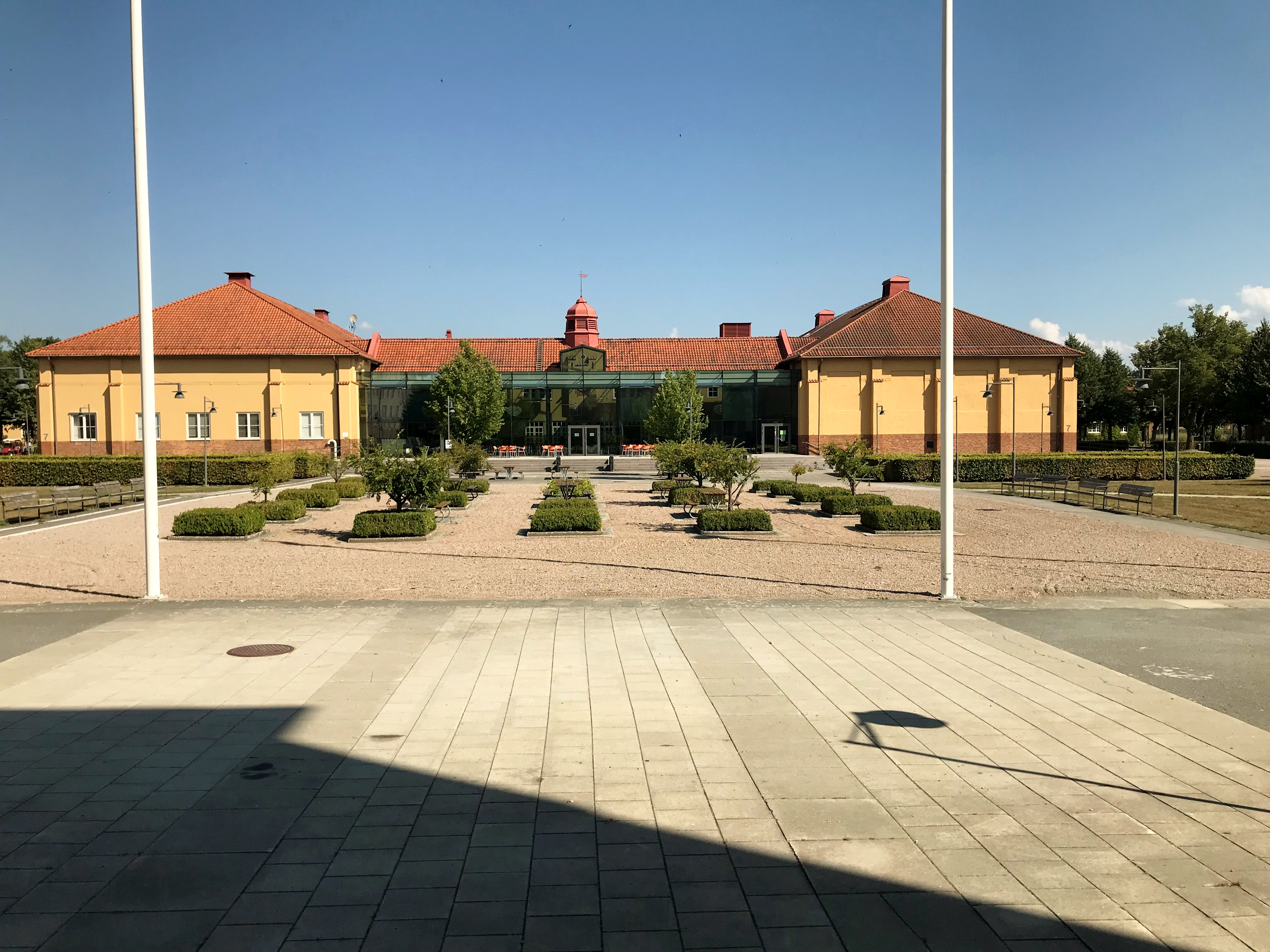
Part of the regiment's former barracks.

=== Training areas ===
The regiment's managed three training areas: Näsby, Ripafältet and Ravlunda.

== Heraldry and traditions ==
=== Anniversary ===
The regiment's anniversary was 13 September, and went by the name Döbelnsdag ("Döbeln's day"), and was celebrated in memory of Battle of Jutas, which was a battle in Finland in 1808 between Sweden and Russia. The Swedish forces were led by Georg Carl von Döbeln, who became North Scanian Infantry Regiment's first regimental commander. The regiment's motto "Honor, duty, will" was von Döbeln's own.

=== Coat of arms ===
The coat of arms was used from 1977 to 1994. Blazon: "Or, the badge of former Kristianstad County, an erazed head of a griffin gules, with open crown azure carrying five plums - red, argent, red, argent, red - and arms azure. The shield surmounted two arms in fess, embowed and vambraced, the hands holding swords in saltire, or."

=== Colours, standards and guidons ===
When the regiment was reorganized into an armoured regiment, the regiment's colour from 1866 continued in use. However, it came to be replaced on 11 September 1971, when the Crown Prince Carl Gustaf presented a new colour. The colour was lowered by the regiment on 23 June 1994, and then deposited with the Scania Dragoon Regiment (Skånska dragonregementet, P 2), which from 1 July 1994 adopted the name North Scania Dragoon Regiment (Norra skånska dragonregementet, P 2), furthering the regiment's traditions.

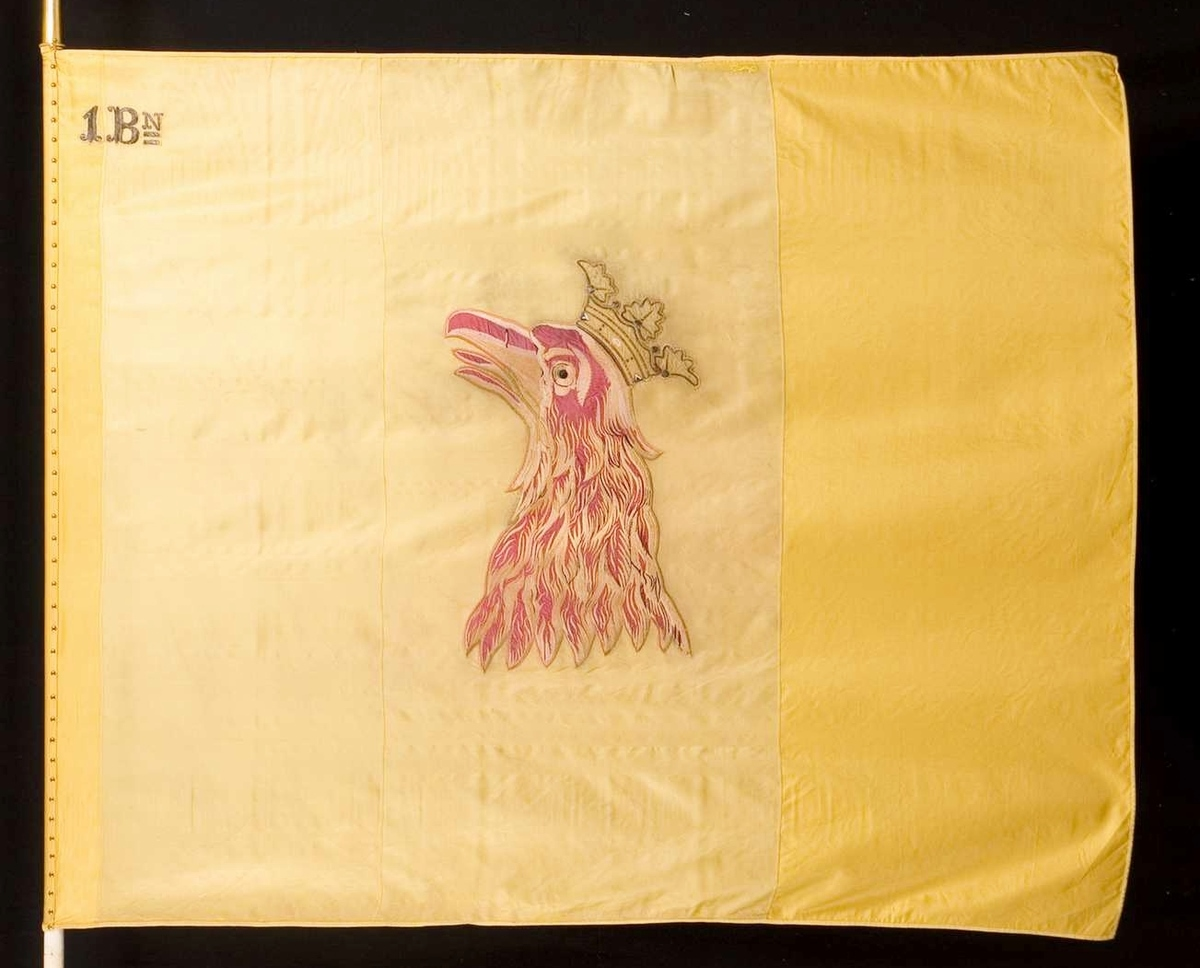
Colour m/1863, 1st Battalion, used until 1971.

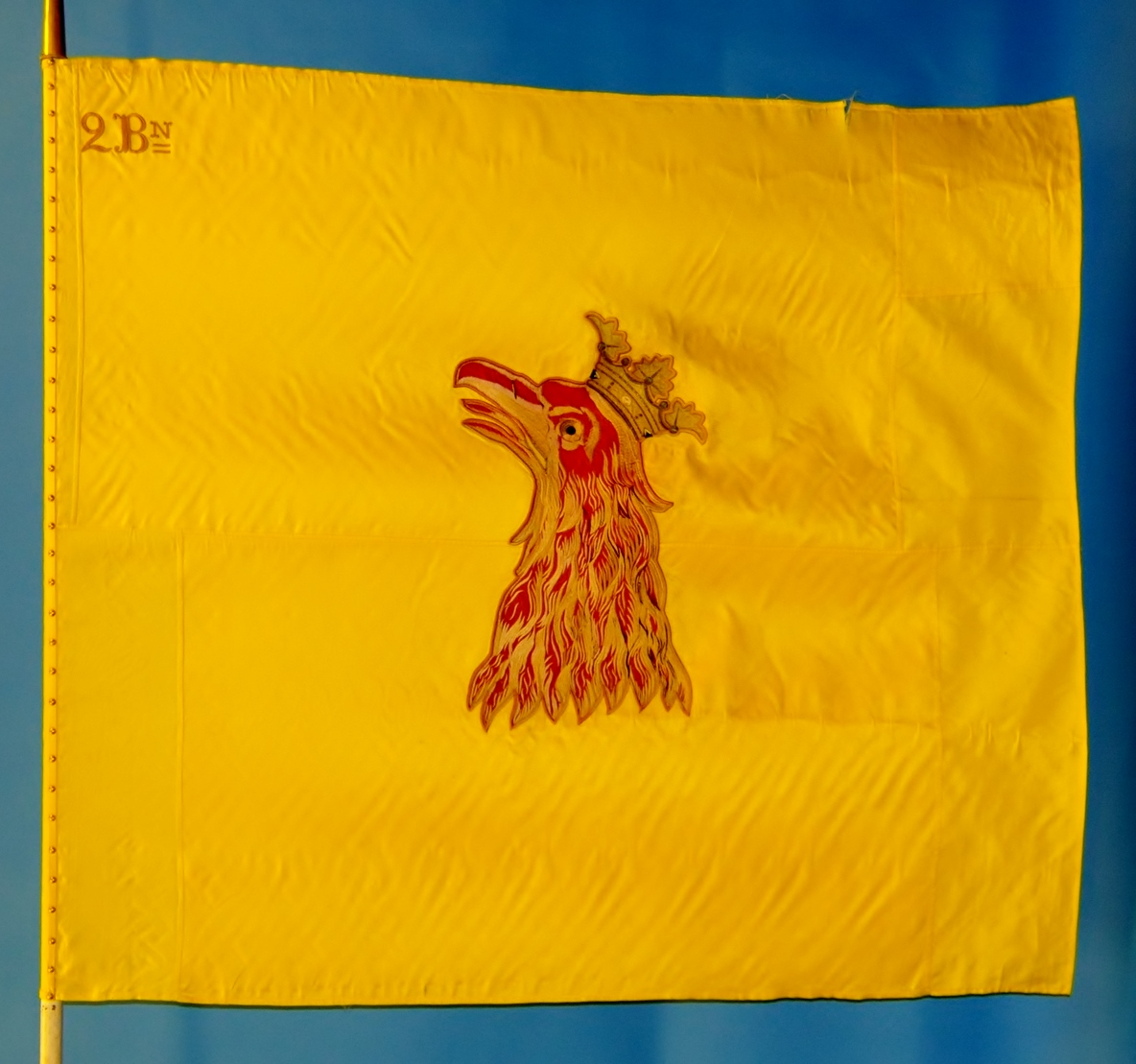
Colour m/1863, 2nd Battalion, used until 1971.

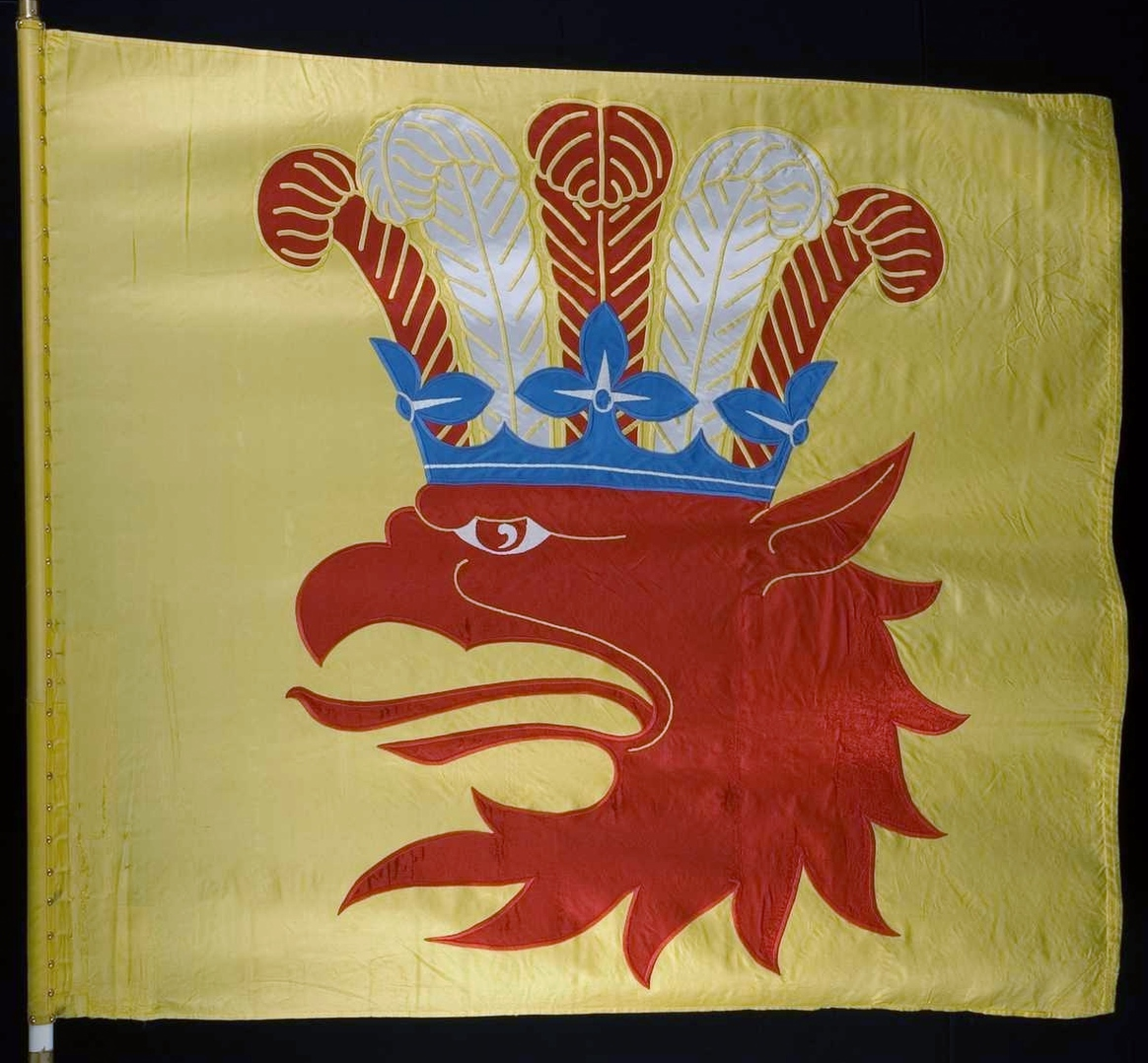
Colour m/1969, used from 1971 to 1994.

=== Medals ===
In 1994, the Norra skånska regementets (P 6/Fo 14) minnesmedalj ("North Scanian Regiment (P 6/Fo 14) Commemorative Medal") in silver (NSkånregSMM). The medal ribbon is of red moiré with a narrow yellow stripe on each side.

Medal ribbon

=== Monuments ===
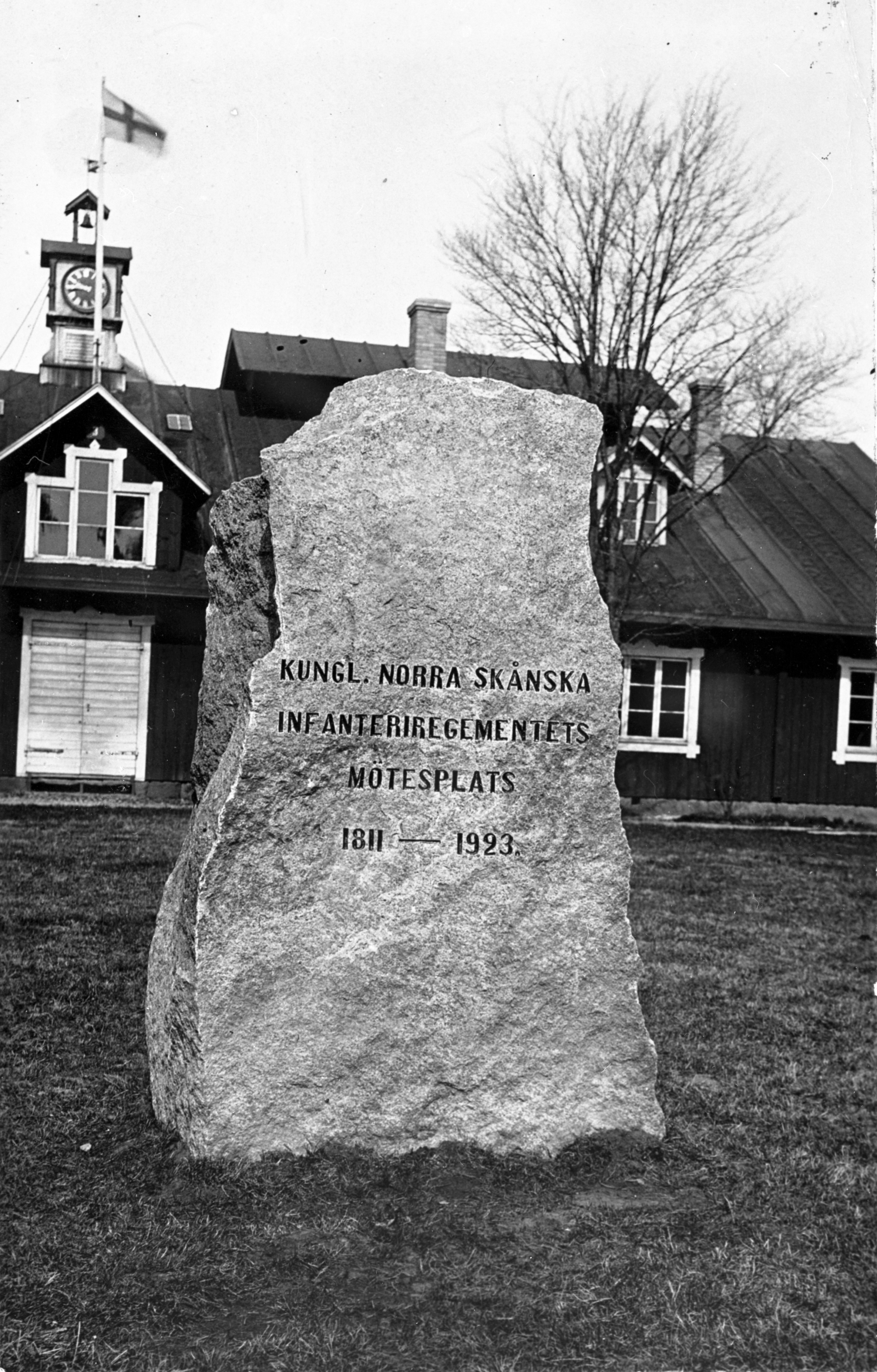
A commemorative stone over the regiment's forerunner, the North Scanian Infantry Regiment.

The regiment has a number of monuments erected. At the old training area in Ljungbyhed, on 10 May 1923, a commemorative stone was erected in memory of the regiment's time in Ljungbyhed. In 1919 a stone was erected in the cemetery at Riseberga Church, in memory of the detention camp at Ljungbyhed. On 19 October 1920, a stone was erected on Bonnarp's heath for two killed airmen who were officers of the regiment. On 13 September 1947, a stone was erected south of the chancellery building in memory of the personnel who served with the regiment during the World War II. On 5 May 1973, a stone, which was unveiled on 18 May 1973, was erected in memory of the 50th anniversary of the barracks establishment. On 3 July 1976, a stone was unveiled at Herrevad Abbey, over the units that operated there. At the church grounds in Kristianstad, stones have also been erected by the regiment.

== Regimental commander ==
- 1963–1967: Curt T:son Alsterlund
- 1967–1977: Lars-Fritiof Melin
- 1977–1983: Curt Hasselgren
- 1983–1992: Nils Malte Lundell
- 1992–1994: Jan Gunnar Bergström

== Names, designations and locations ==
Name	Translation	From		To
Kungl. Norra skånska regementet	Royal North Scanian Regiment	1963-04-01	–	1974-12-31
Norra skånska regementet	North Scanian Regiment	1975-01-01	–	1994-06-30
Designation		From		To
P 6		1963-04-01	–	1975-06-30
P 6/Fo 14		1975-07-01	–	1994-06-30
Locations		From		To
Kristianstad Garrison		1963-04-01	–	1994-06-30

== See also ==
- North Scanian Infantry Regiment
- List of Swedish armoured regiments
