= Martin Hanngren =

Swedish Army officer

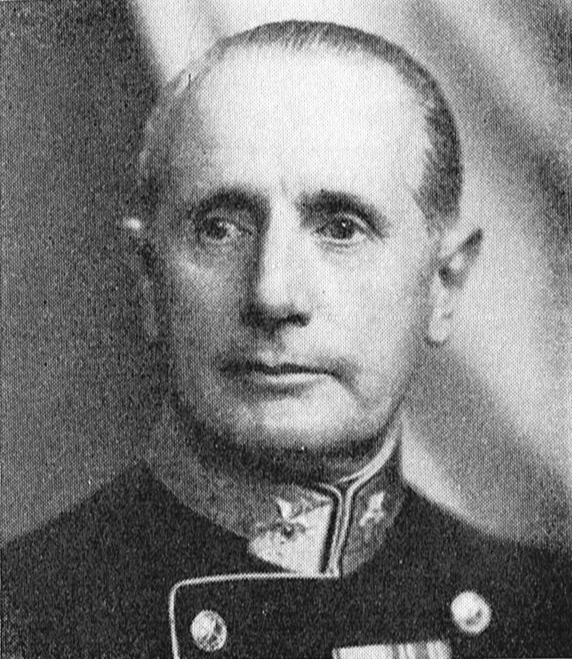
- Hanngren as major general
- Born: Gustaf Martin Hanngren; 24 May 1880; Dala-Husby, Sweden
- Died: 1 July 1945 (aged 65); Stockholm, Sweden
- Military career
- Allegiance: Sweden
- Branch: Swedish Army
- Service years: 1900–1942
- Rank: Lieutenant General
- Commands: North Scanian Infantry Regiment; Inspector of the Infantry

Lieutenant General Gustaf Martin Hanngren (24 May 1880 – 31 July 1945) was a senior Swedish Army officer. Hanngren began his military career in the Dalarna Regiment in 1900 and progressed through various positions. He became a major in the General Staff in 1920 and served as the chief of staff for the 1st Army Division. In 1926, he was promoted to lieutenant colonel in the General Staff and transferred to the Värmland Regiment. In 1936, he was promoted to the rank of major general and appointed Inspector of the Infantry, where he worked to enhance infantry combat capabilities and introduced new equipment and drill regulations. In 1945, he was promoted to the rank of lieutenant general.

== Early life ==
Hanngren was born on 24 May 1880 at Husby kungsgård in Dala-Husby socken, Kopparberg County, Sweden, the son of Colonel Gustaf Hanngren and his wife Olga (née Lagergren). His brother Harald Wilhelm Hanngren (1882–1959) became the sales manager at Korsnäs sågverks AB in 1909 and the managing director there in 1942.

== Career ==
Hanngren became a underlöjtnant in the Dalarna Regiment in 1900, a lieutenant in 1903, and attended the Royal Swedish Army Staff College from 1905 to 1907. He completed his aspirant service from 1908 to 1910 at the General Staff and was appointed a lieutenant at the General Staff in 1911. He became a captain in 1912 and served as an air observer from 1912 to 1913, served at the Military Office of the Land Defence from 1912 to 1914, and was the chief of staff at the command in Boden from 1914 to 1917, as well as a captain at the Life Regiment Grenadiers in 1918. He became a major at the General Staff in 1920 and served as the chief of staff of the 1st Army Division (Första arméfördelningen) from 1920 to 1926.

In 1926, Hanngren became a lieutenant colonel in the General Staff. In the same year, he was transferred to the Värmland Regiment, became a lieutenant colonel at the Svea Life Guards in 1928, and served as acting head of the Royal Swedish Army Staff College from 1928 to 1929. He became a colonel in the army in 1929 and served as the colonel and commander of the North Scanian Infantry Regiment from 1929 to 1936, as well as a brigade commander in the Western Army Division (västra arméfördelningen) in 1936. In 1936, he was promoted to the rank of major general and appointed Inspector of the Infantry. Under his tenure as Inspector of the Infantry, efforts were made to enhance the infantry's combat capabilities, including the introduction of a new and lighter field equipment, with the replacement of the old satchel by the backpack being particularly significant. He also played a key role in developing a new drill regulation for the infantry, for which he personally authored much of the content. He was promoted to the rank of lieutenant general in 1945.

== Personal life ==
In 1914, Hanngren married Elin Lundmarker (born 1892), the daughter of banker Wilhelm Lundmarker and Carolina Almblad. They had two daughters, Ulla (born 1915) and Margaretha (born 1919).

== Death ==
Hanngren died on 31 July 1945 in Stockholm, Sweden. He was interred at the Eastern Cemetery in Kristianstad.

== Dates of rank ==
- 1900 – Underlöjtnant
- 1903 – Lieutenant
- 1912 – Captain
- 1920 – Major
- 1926 – Lieutenant colonel
- 1929 – Colonel
- 1936 – Major general
- 1945 – Lieutenant general

== Awards and decorations ==
=== Swedish ===
- (Sweden) Commander 1st Class of the Order of the Sword (6 June 1935)
- (Sweden) Commander of the Order of the Sword (6 June 1932)
- (Sweden) Knight of the Order of the Sword (1921)
- (Sweden) SkdlGM
- (Sweden) Landstormen Silver Medal (Landstormens silvermedalj)
- (Sweden) Army Shooting Medal (Arméns skyttemedalj)

=== Foreign ===
- Commander 1st Class of the Order of the White Rose of Finland
- (Netherlands) Commander of the Order of Orange-Nassau with swords
- (Denmark) Knight of the Order of the Dannebrog
- (Austria) Austrian Red Cross Honor Badge for Officers

== Honours ==
- Member of the Royal Swedish Academy of War Sciences (1928)

Military offices
Preceded by Erik Testrup	North Scanian Infantry Regiment; 1929–1936	Succeeded by Helge Jung
Preceded by Olof Thörnell	Inspector of the Infantry; 1936–1942	Succeeded by Sven Ryman
