= Carl Trägårdh =

Swedish painter (1861–1899)

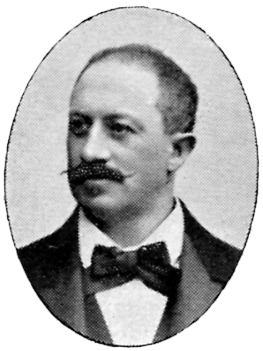
- Born: Carl Ludvig Trägårdh; 20 September 1861; Kristianstad, Sweden
- Died: 5 June 1899 (aged 37); Paris, France
- Education: Royal Swedish Academy of Arts
- Known for: Painting
- Patrons: Jean-Baptiste Faure

Signature
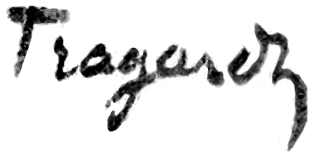

Carl Ludvig Trägårdh (20 September 1861 – 5 June 1899) was a Swedish painter.

== Biography ==
Trägårdh was born in Kristianstad, Sweden. He was the son of Lars Christopher Trägårdh and Göthilda Euphrosyne Littorin. Trägårdh studied with Per Daniel Holm (1835–1903) and Anders Kallenberg (1834–1902) at the Royal Swedish Academy of Arts in Stockholm from 1881 to 1883.

From 1883 to 1884, he studied with Hermann Baisch (1846–1894) in Karlsruhe and with Joseph Wenglein (1845–1919) in Munich until 1885.

He then moved to France where he became a resident for the rest of his life. He exhibited both in France (Bordeaux. 1891) and in Sweden (Helsingborg. 1897; Gothenburg. 1898) as well as at the World's Columbian Exposition during 1893 in Chicago. He received a couple of medals and found a patron in the French singer and art collector Jean-Baptiste Faure (1830–1914) who bought some 40 paintings by him. He died during 1899 at the Hôpital de la Pitié in Paris.

His production often consisted of landscapes featuring pastoral scenes. Trägårdh is represented at the Nationalmuseum, Gothenburg Art Museum, Prince Eugens Waldemarsudde and Lund University as well as at museums in Kristianstad, Norrköping, Gävleborg, Uddevalla, Värmland and Luleå.

== Gallery ==
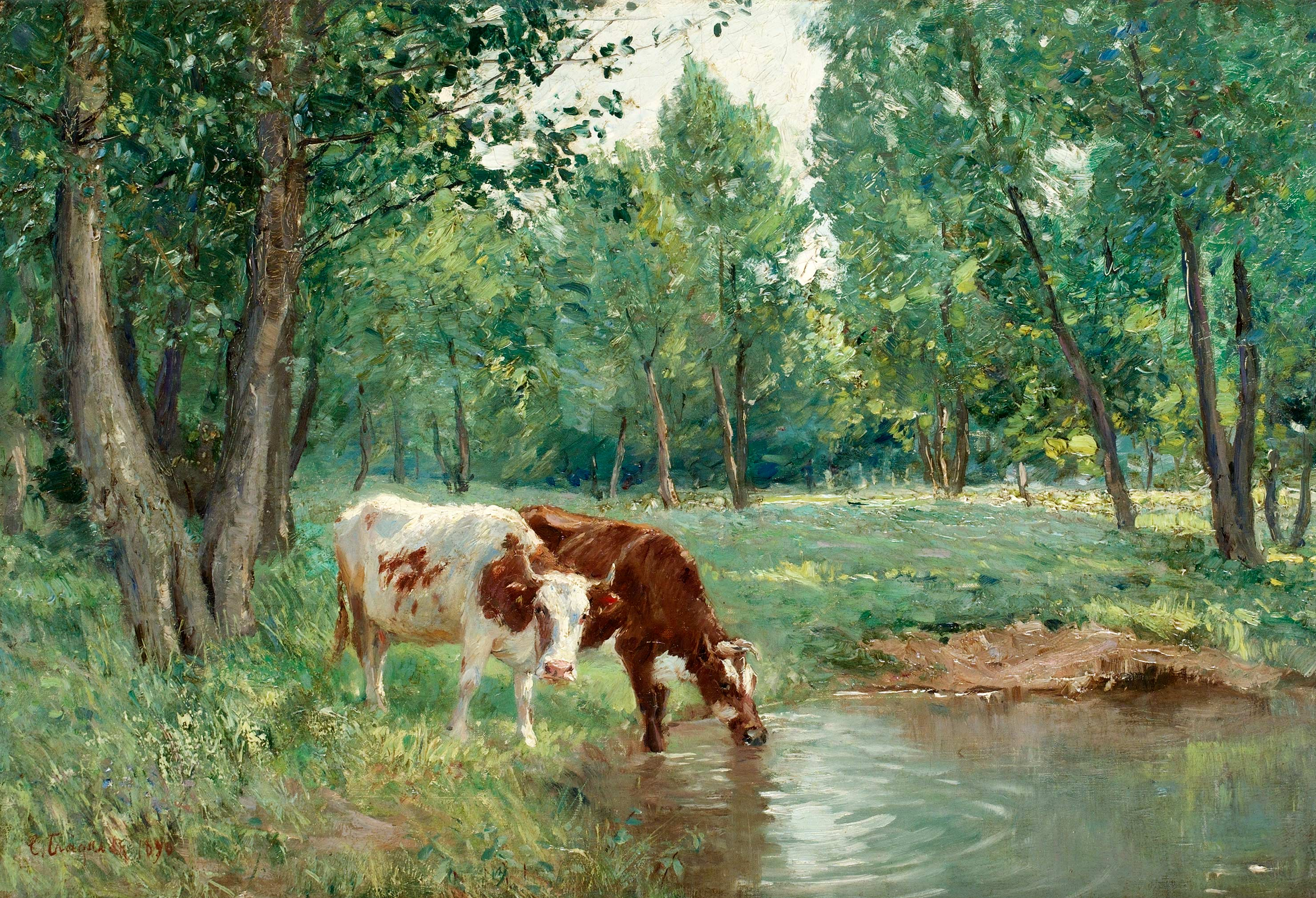
Landscape with cows (1890)

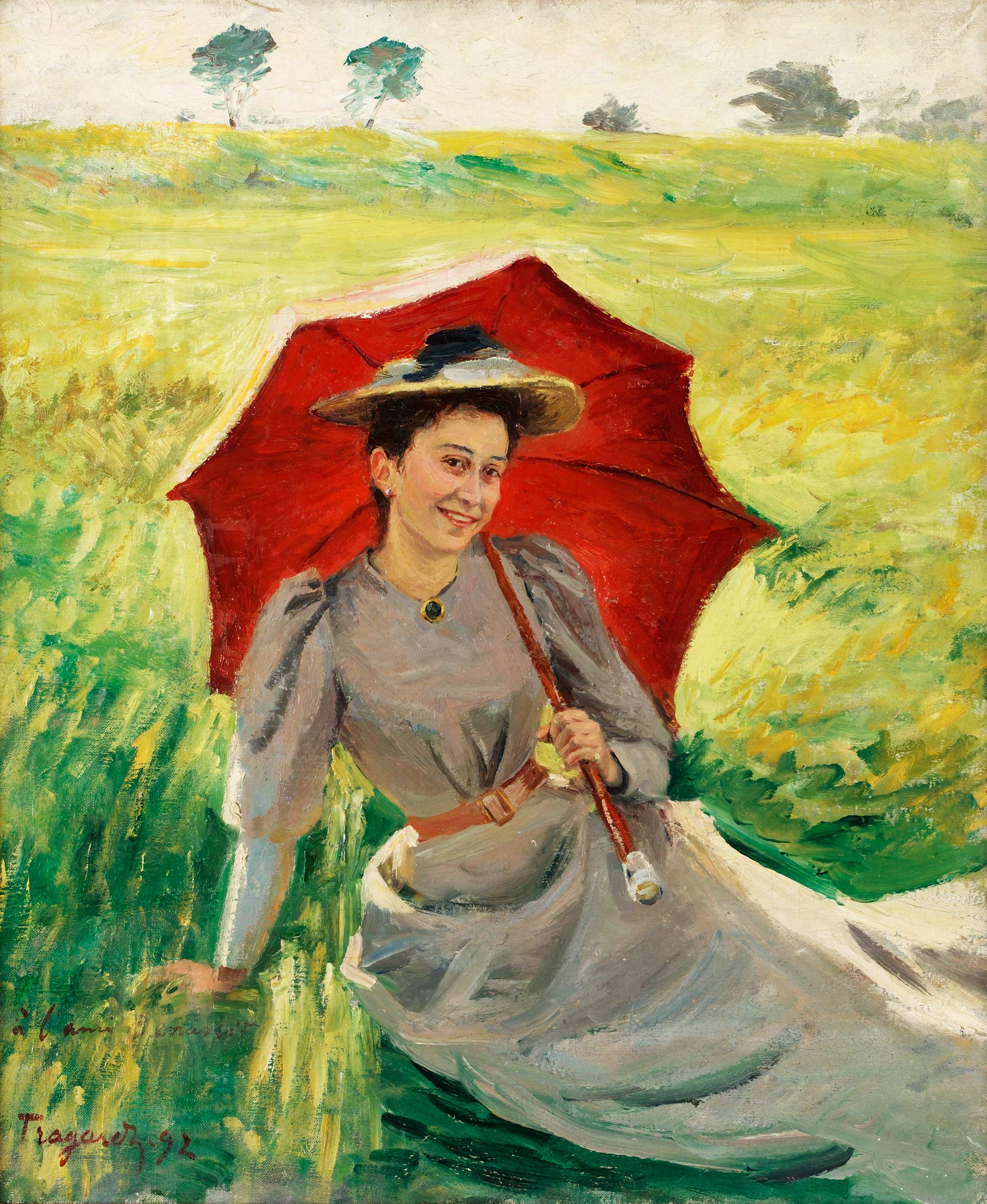
Lady with a red parasol (1892)

== Other sources ==
- Carl Trägårdh in Nordisk familjebok (in Swedish)
- Lexikonett amanda och Kultur1 (in Swedish)
