= Kristianstad University =

University College in Sweden

Coordinates: 56.04740°N 14.14638°E

- Högskolan Kristianstad
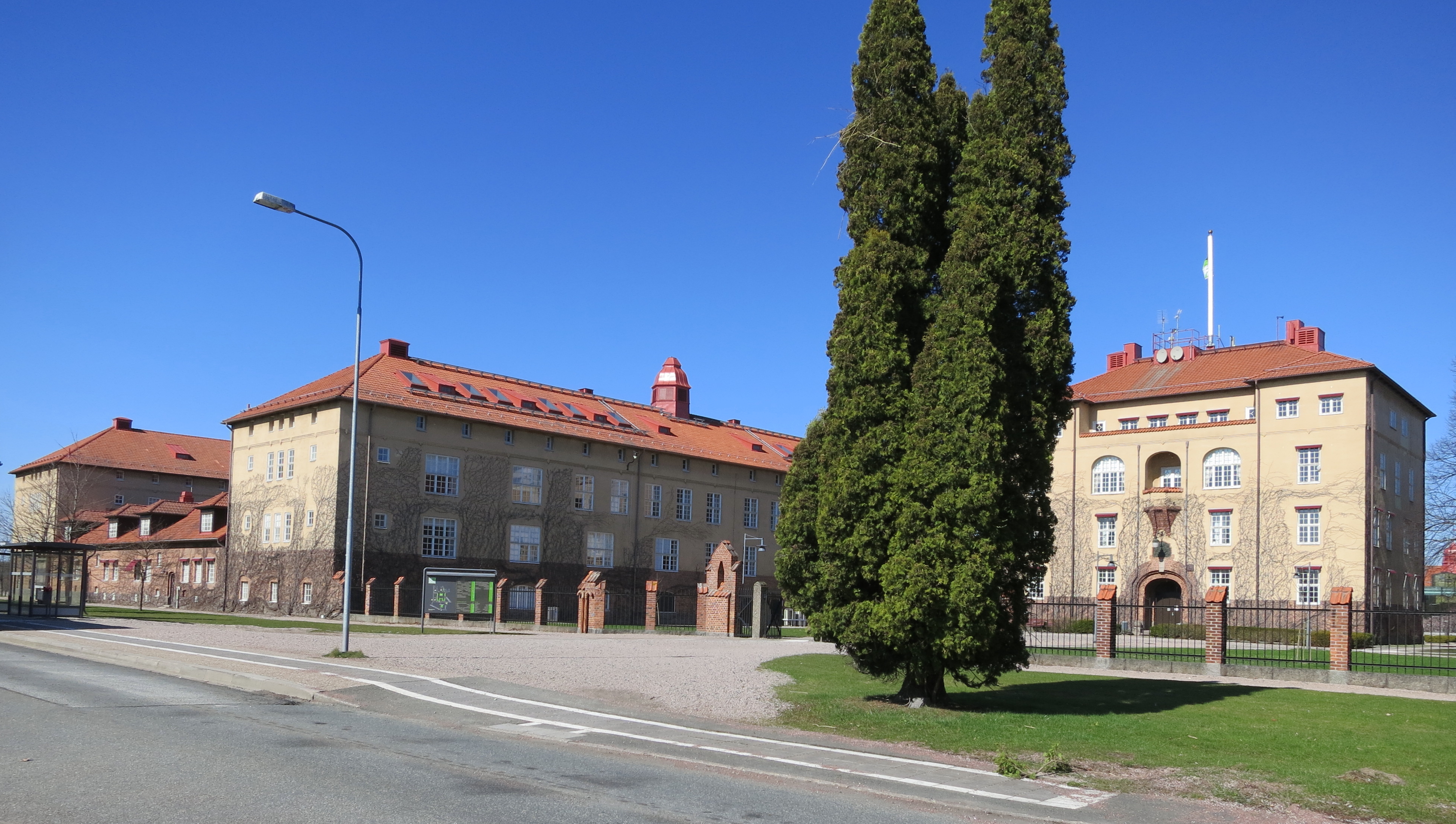
- Kristianstad University College
- Established: 1977; 49 years ago
- Chancellor: Håkan Pihl
- Students: 12,000
- Location: Kristianstad, Sweden
- Website: www.hkr.se

The Kristianstad University (Swedish: Högskolan Kristianstad) is a university college (högskola) in Kristianstad, Sweden.

Established in 1977, Kristianstad University is one of the newest Swedish institutions of higher education. However, higher education in the region is much older. Teacher education can be traced back to 1835. A training course for nursing was started in 1893. Technical education was established in 1912.

Despite the young age of the institution of business administration the BSc programme in business administration is ranked top 3 in the country by the Swedish Council of Higher Education since 2012 (ranked 1st 2012 and 2017).

In 1995, Kristianstad University moved into the present main campus. The college has 12,000 students in various fields of study., Programmes and courses are offered in teaching, behavioural, social, natural and health sciences, business administration and engineering.

Kristianstad University is an associate member of the European University Association. It also participates in the Erasmus Programme.

The student governing body, the student union, is Kristianstad Stundentkår.

== Academic departments ==
=== Faculty of Health Science ===
Education and research is conducted at the Faculty of health science within four departments:

- Department of Nursing and Health Sciences
- Department of Oral Health
- Department of Public Health
- Department of Social Sciences

=== Faculty of Natural Science ===
Education and research are conducted at the faculty within three departments:

- Department of Computer Science
- Department of Food and Meal Science
- Department of Environmental Science and Bioscience

=== Faculty of Education ===
Education and research is conducted at the faculty within five departments:

- Department of Humanities
- Department of Mathematics and Science Education
- Department of Psychology
- Department of Educational Sciences specializing in Pre-School and After School Care, Teaching and Learning
- Department of Educational Sciences specializing in Primary and Secondary School, and Special Needs Education

=== Faculty of Business ===
Education and research is conducted at the faculty within three departments:

- Department of Business
- Department of Design
- Department of Work science
