= Georg Carl von Döbeln =

Swedish Military Commander (1758–1820)

Lieutenant General Baron Georg Carl von Döbeln
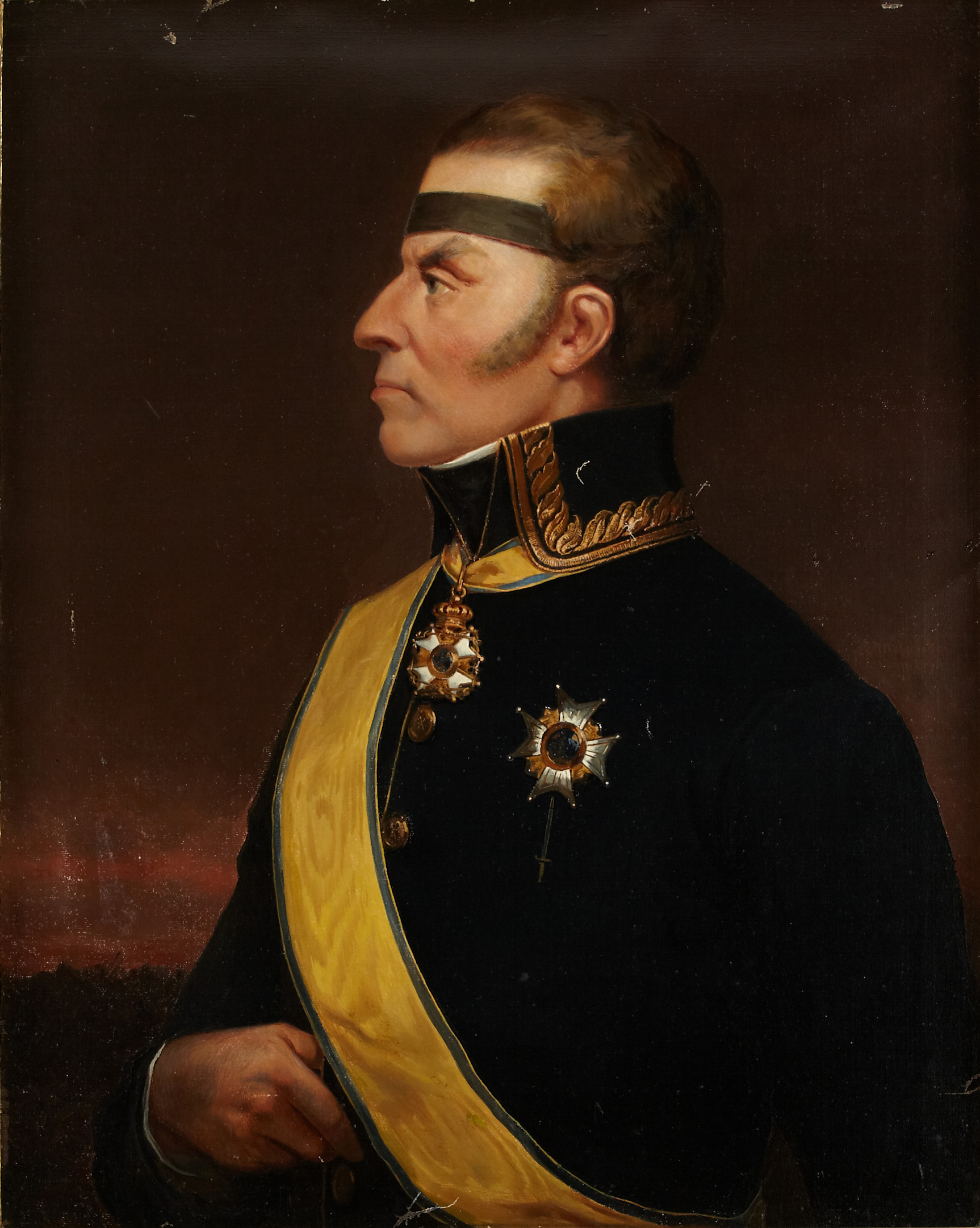
- Georg Carl von Döbeln, oil on canvas by an unknown painter.
- Born: 29 April 1758; Stora Torpa, Segerstad, Sweden
- Died: 16 February 1820 (aged 61); Stockholm, Sweden
- Burial place: St. John's Church
- Spouse: Kristina Karolina Ullström (m. 1810)
- Children: Napoleon
- Relatives: Johan Jakob von Döbeln (father); Anna Maria Lindgren (mother); Johan Jacob Döbelius (great-grandfather)
- Military career
- Allegiance: Sweden; Kingdom of France
- Branch: Swedish Army; French Army
- Service years: 1778–1813
- Rank: Lieutenant General
- Conflicts: Russo-Swedish War (1788–1790); Battle of Porrassalmi; Dano-Swedish War of 1808–1809; Jämtland Campaigns of 1808–1809; Battle of Hjerpe Skans; Finnish War; Battle of Pyhäjoki; Battle of Siikajoki; Battle of Kauhajoki; Battle of Jutas; Battle of Lapua; Battle of Nykarleby; Åland Offensive; War of the Sixth Coalition
- Awards: Commander with the Great Cross of the Order of the Sword; Knight with the Great Cross of the Order of the Sword

Georg Carl von Döbeln (29 April 1758 – 16 February 1820) was a Swedish friherre (baron), Lieutenant general and above all known for his efforts on the Swedish side during the Finnish War.

== Early life ==
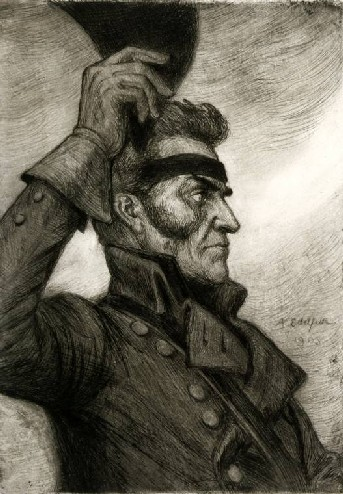
Döbeln at Jutas by Albert Edelfelt.

Georg Carl was born at the Stora Torpa manor in Segerstads parish in Västergötland (now Falköping Municipality) to district court judge (häradshövding) Johan Jakob von Döbeln and Anna Maria Lindgren. He was also the great-grandson of professor and city physician Johan Jacob Döbelius. When von Döbeln was eight years old his father died and he was put in school by relatives with the aim of him becoming a priest. The boy however, showed affinity for a military life and he was enrolled at the Karlskrona naval academy in 1773. Upon graduating as an officer in 1775, he was directed by the family towards a career in law. Disliking this, he sought employment as a junior officer in 1778.

== Military career ==
As a lieutenant, Döbeln took part in Gustav III's Russian War and was shot in the forehead at the Battle of Porrassalmi. The wound did not heal properly and he was forced to wear a black silken bandanna for the rest of his life. During the operation he stayed awake and wrote about it while looking at the whole process with the help of a mirror.

Before returning to Sweden for the Russian War of 1788–1790, von Döbeln had served with French forces in India. At the bloody Battle of Cuddalore in 1783 he distinguished himself by his boldness, and also served as an engineering officer — a role in which he showed considerable versatility. When his regiment returned to France in 1784 he had been promoted to captain and become the regimental adjutant.

He then rapidly advanced to colonel and took part in the Finnish War. On 13 September 1808, he led the Swedish troops in the Battle of Jutas. For this, he would become legendary as the main hero of the war. His reputation was further enhanced when Johan Ludvig Runeberg wrote his epic Döbeln at Jutas in the Finnish National Poem Fänrik Ståls Sägner (in Swedish).

During his convalescence after the Battle of Jutas, von Döbeln presented to Commander-in-Chief Wilhelm Mauritz Klingspor an ambitious plan for the reconquest of Finland. According to the plan, the main army should halt its northward retreat and instead march south, bypass the pursuing Russian forces without engaging them, and advance on Hämeenlinna (Tavastehus), where it could unite with reinforcements from Sweden and drive the enemy from the country. Von Döbeln argued that such a bold and surprising move was the only way to retake Finland, and that if it failed the situation could be no worse than it already was. Klingspor considered the plan too risky and it was never attempted.

He successfully led the Swedish retreat from the Åland islands over the frozen Baltic Sea. Having re-organized his troops, he engaged Russian forces which ultimately stopped a planned attack on the Swedish capital, Stockholm.

Döbeln was the commanding officer of the North Army on 8 October 1809, when the last formal ties between Sweden and Finland were cut through the dismissal of the last Swedish-Finnish army in the church park of Umeå in Västerbotten North Sweden. Döbeln's final orders to the parading army, issued verbally prior to dismissal, is considered to be the very essence of rhetoric in Swedish, and has been taught to generations of school-children.

In the War of the Sixth Coalition he commanded troops in Swedish Pomerania and led 15,000 troops to relieve Hamburg, which was besieged by the French, contrary to royal standing orders to not engage French forces unless possessing a three-to-one advantage, or to cross the Elbe River. Döbeln had received an urgent appeal from the citizens of Hamburg to protect them from the French, to which he gave his word that he would make an attempt to take the city. Despite a further written order from Swedish Crown Prince Charles John (formerly French Marshal Bernadotte), the commander-in-chief of the Swedish Army, Döbeln's troops defeated the French masking force and occupied Hamburg on 21 May 1813.

He and his forces would be forced to retreat a week later when the French XIII Corps, numbering 34,000 under the famed Marshal Davout, arrived to re-take Hamburg. For violating the Crown Prince's repeated and explicit orders to not liberate Hamburg, Döbeln was court-martialled and sentenced to be executed. However, the execution order was countermanded by Charles John himself, who had Döbeln sequestered in Vaxholm Prison during the autumn of 1813.

While there, Döbeln wrote a letter to a relative, expressing the desire to be allowed to fight in the conflict, and serve out his sentence after the fighting concluded. The letter's contents became known to the Crown Prince, whose Gascon romanticism was touched, and he fully pardoned Döbeln. The two remained on good terms until Döbeln's death in 1820.

== Personal life ==
He was married to Kristina Karolina Ullström (they later divorced). The couple had one son, Napoleon (1802–1847). Although popular, having had a great career and after his death considered a war hero, von Döbeln lived his last years impoverished.

Döbelns Park in central Umeå in northern Sweden is the oldest park in Umeå. It came to be named after Döbeln when his monument was placed in the park in 1867. There is also a smaller park called "Döbelns plan" in the same city. A 1942 film was made about his 1813 campaign in North Germany.
