= Kristianstad =

City in Scania, Sweden

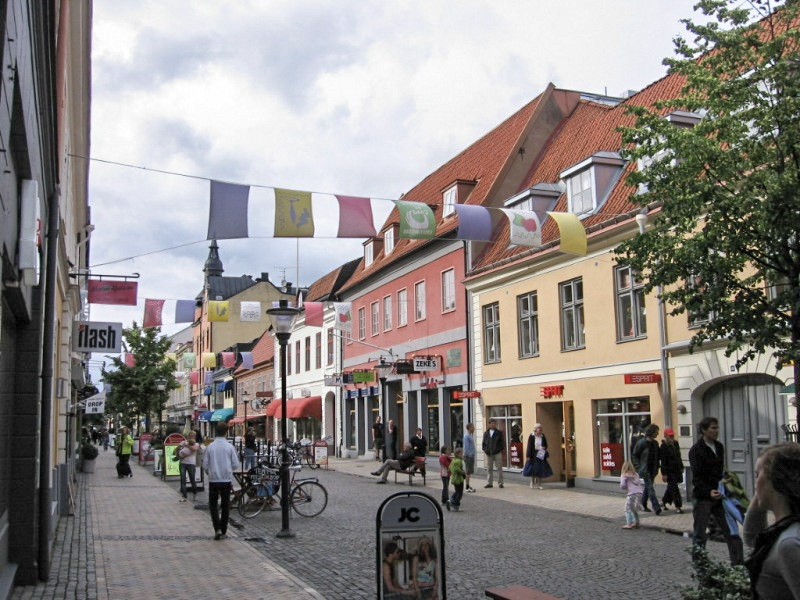
- Kristianstad

- Coat of arms

- Location within Scania Location within Sweden Location within European Union
- Coordinates: 56°01′46″N 14°09′24″E
- Country: Sweden
- Province: Scania
- County: Skåne
- Municipality: Kristianstad

Area
  - Total: 22.44 km^{2} (8.66 sq mi)

Population (2023)
  - Total: 41,198
  - Density: 1,836/km^{2} (4,760/sq mi)
- Time zone: UTC+1 (CET)
  - Summer (DST): UTC+2 (CEST)
- Website: www.kristianstad.se (in Swedish)

Kristianstad (UK: /ˈkrɪstʃənstɑːd/ KRIS-chən-stahd, Swedish: [krɪˈɧǎnːsta] or [-stɑːd]) is a city and the seat of Kristianstad Municipality, Scania County, Sweden with 41,198 inhabitants in 2023. Since the 1990s, the city has gone from being a garrison town to a developed commercial city, focusing on nature preservation and a food profile.

== History ==
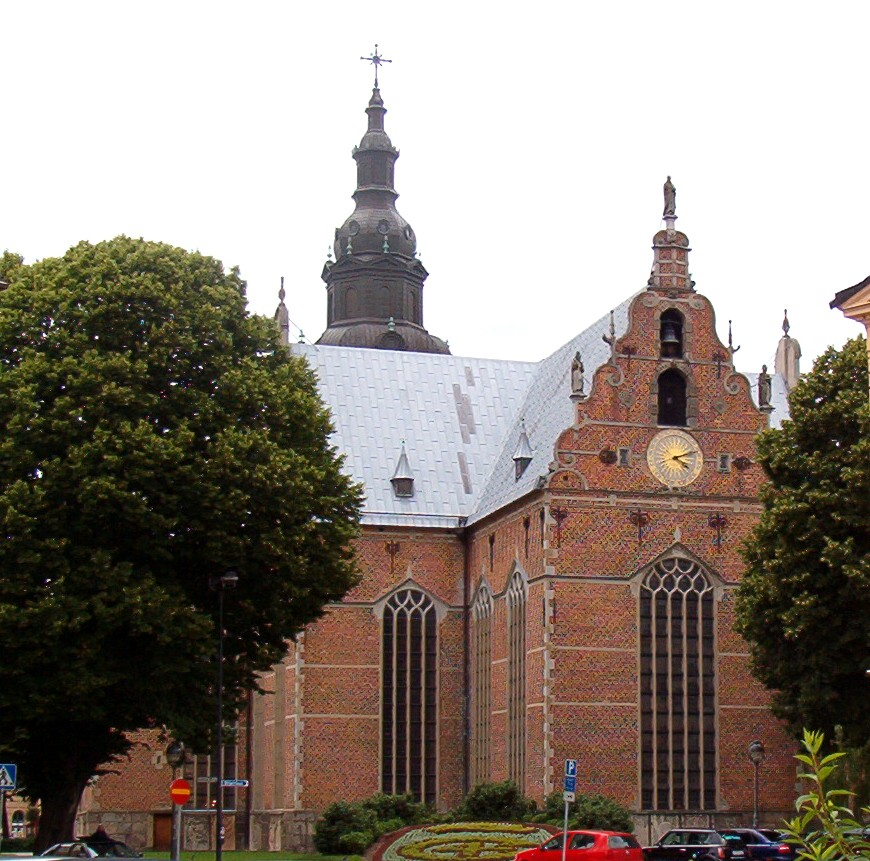
Trinity Church (Heliga Trefaldighetskyrkan)

The city was founded in 1614 by King Christian IV of Denmark (the city's name literally means 'Town of Christian' or "Christian's town") as a planned city after the burning of the nearby town of Vä and moving the city rights of the neighbouring town of Vå and Åhus to the new town. The purpose of the town was to safeguard the eastern half of the Danish province of Scania against any future raids from Sweden in the north, but also as a symbol of the power of Christian himself. One of these raids had sacked the nearby town of Vä in 1612. Vä then lost its charter and the people were relocated to the new, better fortified city. The king also founded the town of Kristianopel in eastern Blekinge to serve a similar purpose.

Construction of the towns was a project for the King Christian IV, and Kristianstad's church was built by him. The church was built considerably larger than there was initially use for. The king also wanted a castle or fortress constructed inside the town but shortage of funds made this impossible, of the intended castle only an arsenal was constructed which today serves as the main building of the local museum. Also in Christianstad the town planning of the Renaissance could be laid down for the first time at the foundation of the town.

In 1658 Scania, Kristianstad and the eastern third of Denmark was ceded to Sweden following the Treaty of Roskilde.

Pylyp Orlyk was after 1709 chosen as a Hetman in exile by the cossacks and the Swedish king Charles XII. While in Bender Orlyk wrote one of the first state constitutions in Europe. This Constitution of Pylyp Orlyk was confirmed by Charles XII and it also names him as the protector of Ukraine. After 1714 Orlyk now together with several other cossacks followed the Swedish king Charles XII to Sweden. Orlyk with his family and about 40 other Cossacks arrived in Ystad, Sweden in late November 1715. After some months in Ystad they lived in the city of Kristianstad for some years. Orlyk wrote numerous proclamations and essays about Ukraine including the 1710 Constitution of Pylyp Orlyk.

Kristianstad served as capital of Kristianstad County between 1719 and 1997. It now houses the administration and the regional parliament of the Skåne Regional Council. For a long time Kristianstad also was a very important garrison town, the Wendes Artillery Regiment (A 3) and the North Scanian Regiment (P 6) being the town's most prominent military units. Also the town housed for many years the so-called Scanian Fortification Brigade. The Wendes Artillery Regiment served with distinction in the Napoleonic Wars. One of Sweden's higher courts of appeal was located in Kristianstad before being moved to Malmö in 1917.

Until 1996, Kristianstad was a city of residence in Kristianstad County, but in 1997 merged with Skåne County. Since the county councils were also merged into Region Skåne, the city became the seat of its regional council from 1999. The County Administrative Court in Skåne County was also located in Kristianstad until 2008.

In Kristianstad, seven countries have maintained honorary consulates during different periods. A Royal Danish Vice Consulate was established in 1855 and elevated to a consulate in 2002, but was withdrawn in 2012. A North American consular agency existed 1873 — 1887 (the same man was the Danish deputy consul and North American consular agent). The independent Kingdom of Norway established a deputy consulate in 1907, which was, however, withdrawn in 1937, to be re-established in 1946 and elevated to a consulate in 1988, but it is now revoked. Argentina had a vice consulate 1911 — 1935. Finland also had a vice consulate in Kristianstad 1923 — 1925 and 1931 — 1967. Lithuania established a consulate in 1995 and it is the only consulate left in Kristianstad today. Germany established a consulate in 1996, but it is now withdrawn.

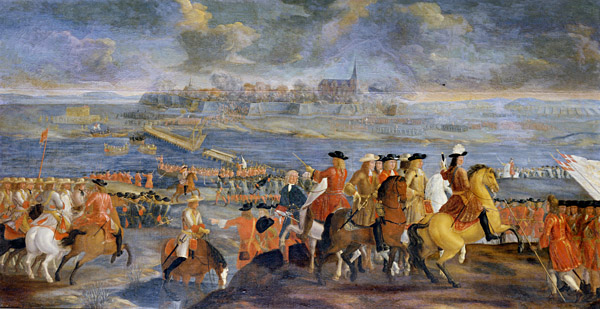
Short-lived Danish capture of Kristianstad during the Scanian War (1676), painting by Claus Møinichen.

== Geography ==
Sweden's lowest point, at 2.41 meters below mean sea level, is located in Kristianstad. Because of this, parts of the city have to be protected from flooding by a system of levees and water pumps. To expand the city, large areas of low-lying wetlands have had to be walled in, especially to the east. To prevent future flooding of the city center, the existing levees are in the process of being reinforced and new levees against both Helge å and Hammarsjön are under construction. An extensive system of ponds and dams is also under construction. The threat of flooding became substantial during late winter 2002, when the greater part of the public park Tivoliparken was under water. However, the wetlands around the city are starting to be regarded more as an asset, not least thanks to the creation of Kristianstads Vattenrike Biosphere Reserve. Today the Vattenriket is a Unesco biosphere reserve.

== Climate ==
Kristianstad has a humid continental climate. Summers are warm and comparatively long by Swedish standards.

Climate data for Kristianstad, 2002–2020; extremes since 1901, precipitation 1961–1990
Month	Jan	Feb	Mar	Apr	May	Jun	Jul	Aug	Sep	Oct	Nov	Dec	Year
Record high °C (°F)	11.6 (52.9)	15.3 (59.5)	20.4 (68.7)	25.6 (78.1)	29.5 (85.1)	33.2 (91.8)	32.9 (91.2)	33.6 (92.5)	27.5 (81.5)	23.5 (74.3)	17.7 (63.9)	13.0 (55.4)	33.6 (92.5)
Mean daily maximum °C (°F)	2.7 (36.9)	3.4 (38.1)	7.3 (45.1)	12.5 (54.5)	17.6 (63.7)	21.0 (69.8)	23.1 (73.6)	22.2 (72.0)	18.4 (65.1)	12.3 (54.1)	7.6 (45.7)	4.4 (39.9)	12.7 (54.9)
Daily mean °C (°F)	0.3 (32.5)	0.8 (33.4)	3.2 (37.8)	7.1 (44.8)	12.0 (53.6)	15.5 (59.9)	17.8 (64.0)	17.3 (63.1)	13.6 (56.5)	8.8 (47.8)	5.0 (41.0)	2.0 (35.6)	8.7 (47.7)
Mean daily minimum °C (°F)	−2.2 (28.0)	−2.0 (28.4)	−0.9 (30.4)	1.7 (35.1)	6.4 (43.5)	10.0 (50.0)	12.6 (54.7)	12.5 (54.5)	9.0 (48.2)	5.2 (41.4)	2.6 (36.7)	0.0 (32.0)	4.7 (40.5)
Record low °C (°F)	−27.8 (−18.0)	−23.4 (−10.1)	−22.8 (−9.0)	−8.5 (16.7)	−3.8 (25.2)	0.2 (32.4)	4.5 (40.1)	2.2 (36.0)	−2.0 (28.4)	−9.9 (14.2)	−15.0 (5.0)	−24.6 (−12.3)	−27.8 (−18.0)
Average precipitation mm (inches)	47.7 (1.88)	33.0 (1.30)	36.2 (1.43)	36.1 (1.42)	42.4 (1.67)	47.4 (1.87)	64.0 (2.52)	50.1 (1.97)	54.8 (2.16)	50.6 (1.99)	53.7 (2.11)	50.7 (2.00)	561.8 (22.12)
Source 1: SMHI Average Precipitation 1961-1990
Source 2: SMHI Average Data 2002-2016

== Environmental ==
Kristianstad has now reached a significant milestone. In this city—which, along with its surrounding municipality, has a population of 80,000—virtually no oil, natural gas, or coal is used to heat homes and businesses, even during long and harsh winter seasons. This represents a radical shift from the situation 20 years ago, when all of the area’s thermal energy was derived from fossil fuels.

== Industry ==
Absolut Vodka, owned by Pernod Ricard, is produced in the town of Åhus located within the municipality. Kristianstad was the main military seat in Scania for a long time, boosting military camps and trainings. After the reforms and military cutbacks of the 1990s all of these have been closed, although a new military presence is being established in nearby Rinkaby which holds an old military training ground.

In and around Kristianstad are numerous enterprises concerned with agriculture and it is usually said that every Swede everyday eats something produced from Kristianstad. Kristianstad University, specialized in educating teachers and nurses, is located at the old garrison ground for the I6 North Scanian Infantry Regiment (later mechanized as Pansar Regiment 6).

== Culture ==
The Swedish Film industry (Svensk Filmindustri) commenced its activities in Kristianstad in the 1910s, before moving to Stockholm in 1920. Today the old studio is a museum where you can visit Sweden's very first film studio, preserved and restored to its original condition from 1909. The pioneering days of film in Kristianstad with 'Svenska bio' are the prelude to the heyday of Swedish film and its international breakthrough.

Kristianstad Art Gallery is located in the old post office building from 1917, designed by architect Erik Lallerstedt, and shares an entrance with the Kristianstad Regional Museum. Kristianstad Art Gallery is run by the cultural heritage organization Regionmuseet Skåne on behalf of Kristianstad Municipality and was inaugurated in December 2001. The focus is on contemporary art.

== Transport ==
=== Air ===
Kristianstad Österlen Airport is located 16 km (10 mi) south of Kristianstad. Since December 2024, the airport stop regular commercial passenger flights. The nearest airports to the city are Ronneby Airport, located 92 km (57 mi) to the east and Malmö Airport, located 92 km (57 mi) to the south west of the city.

== Coat of arms ==
The city's coat of arms depicts two lions holding the King Christian IV's crowned insignia, the monogram C4. The coat of arms was only slightly modified after the Swedish takeover following the 1658 Treaty of Roskilde in which the eastern third of Denmark was ceded to Sweden. Since 1971, the coat of arms is used by Kristianstad Municipality. A reason for the Swedes to continue using the old coat of arms could be its colours – blue and yellow. At the end of the 19th century, Christianstads Enskilda Bank (founded in 1865) issued banknotes with portraits of Christian IV instead of the Swedish king (the individual banks' right to issue banknotes ceased in 1898).

== Events ==
In 2011, Sweden hosted the 22nd World Scout Jamboree of the International Scout Movement. The Jamboree had about 40 000 participants from 144 countries and was organized at Rinkabyfältet, Kristianstad.

Every summer there is a major beach handball tournament taking place in the seaside resort of Åhus in the municipality. The Åhus Beach handball Festival is Europe's largest beach handball tournament. During 10 days over 1000 teams, 10000 players and 2300 leaders gather on the beach to compete in the sport. The festival was founded in 1997.

== Notable natives ==
- Magnus Colcord Heurlin, artist from Alaska
- Ingeman Arbnor, economist
- Fredrik Böök, author
- Bror Erik Friberg, Judge of Assessment Court, New Zealand, 1877
- Ann-Louise Hanson, singer
- Bo Lundgren, politician
- Emma Lundberg, artist and architect
- Augusta Lundin, fashion designer
- Hulda Lundin, tailor and educator
- Åke Ohlmarks, writer
- Vivi Sylwan, textile historian and curator
- Johan Christopher Toll, soldier
- Carl Ludvig Trägårdh, artist
- Lisa Nordén, professional triathlete, 2008 Olympian and 2012 Olympic silver medalist
- Timothy Liljegren, professional ice hockey player, Toronto Maple Leafs
- Kosovare Asllani, professional football player
- Johan Stureson, racing driver
- Olle Jönsson, singer of Lasse Stefanz
- Anders Linderoth, professional football player
- Ella Tiritiello, singer

== Sister cities ==
Kristianstad has two sister cities:

- Køge, Denmark
- Rendsburg, Germany

== Sights ==
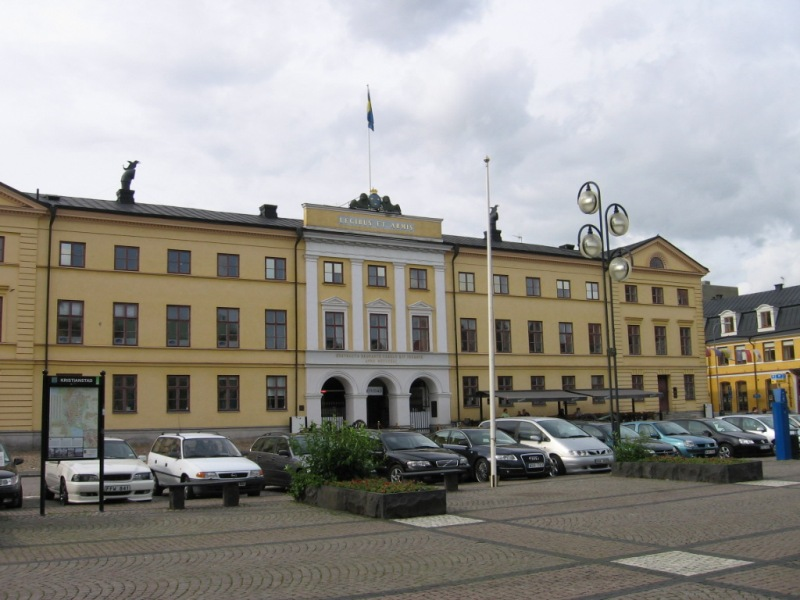
Stora Kronohuset

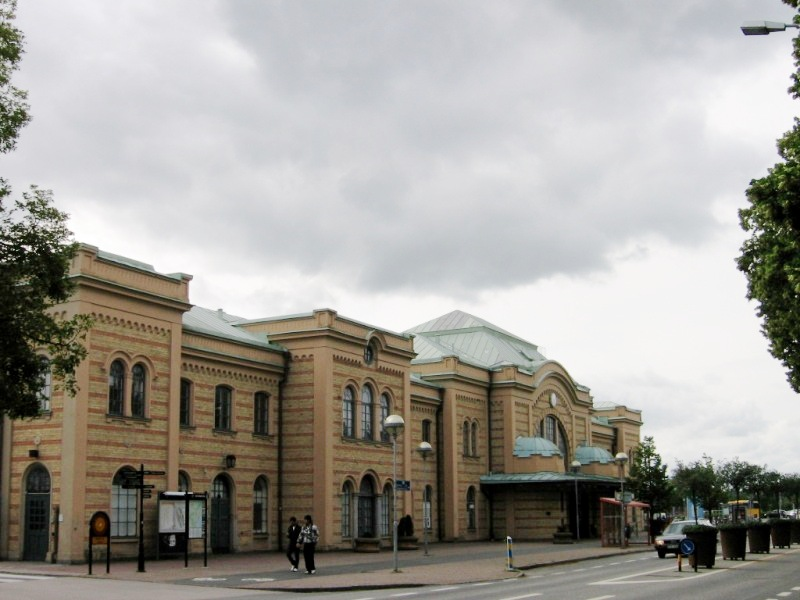
Railway station

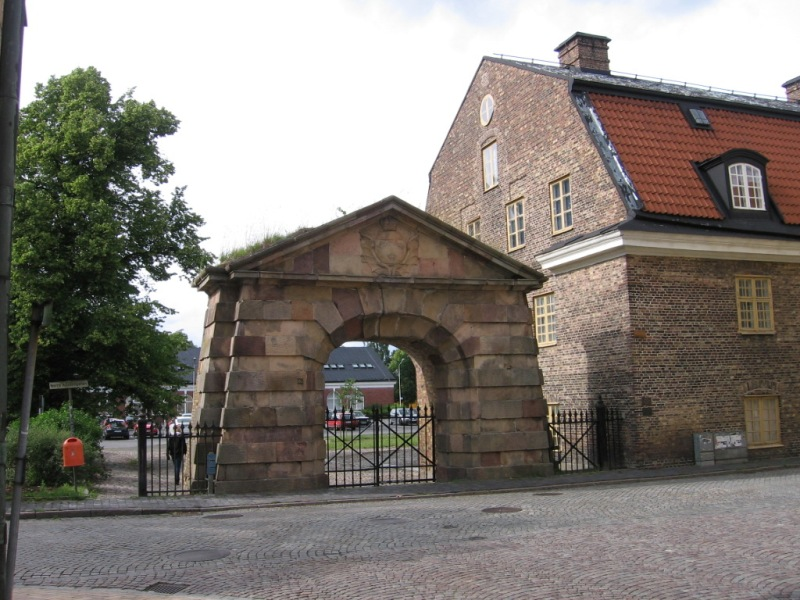
Citygate

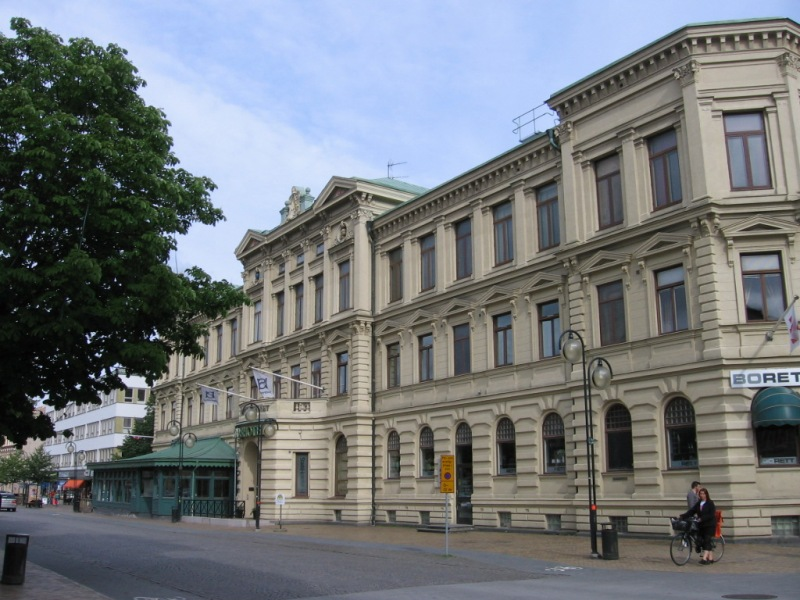
Cityhotel (Stadshotellet), also the Freemason House

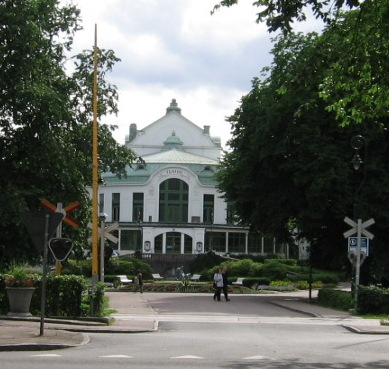
Theatre

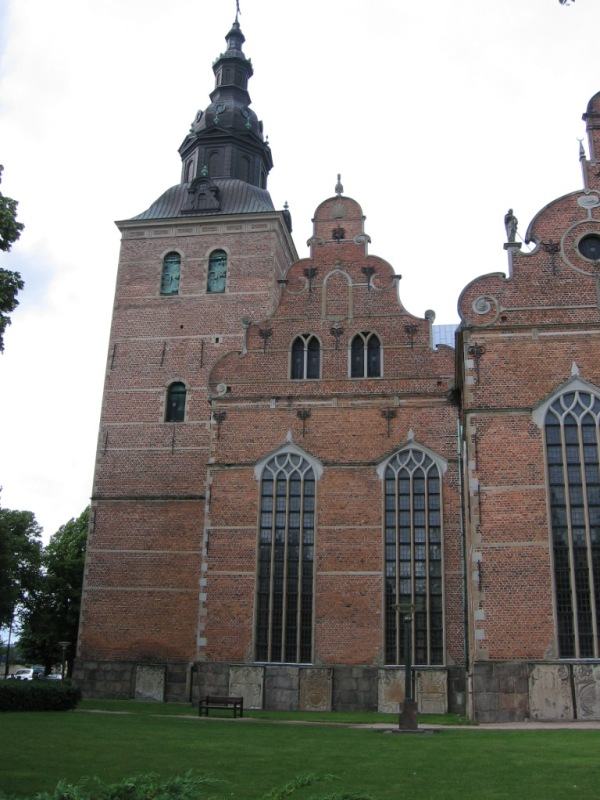
Heliga Trefaldighetskyrkan

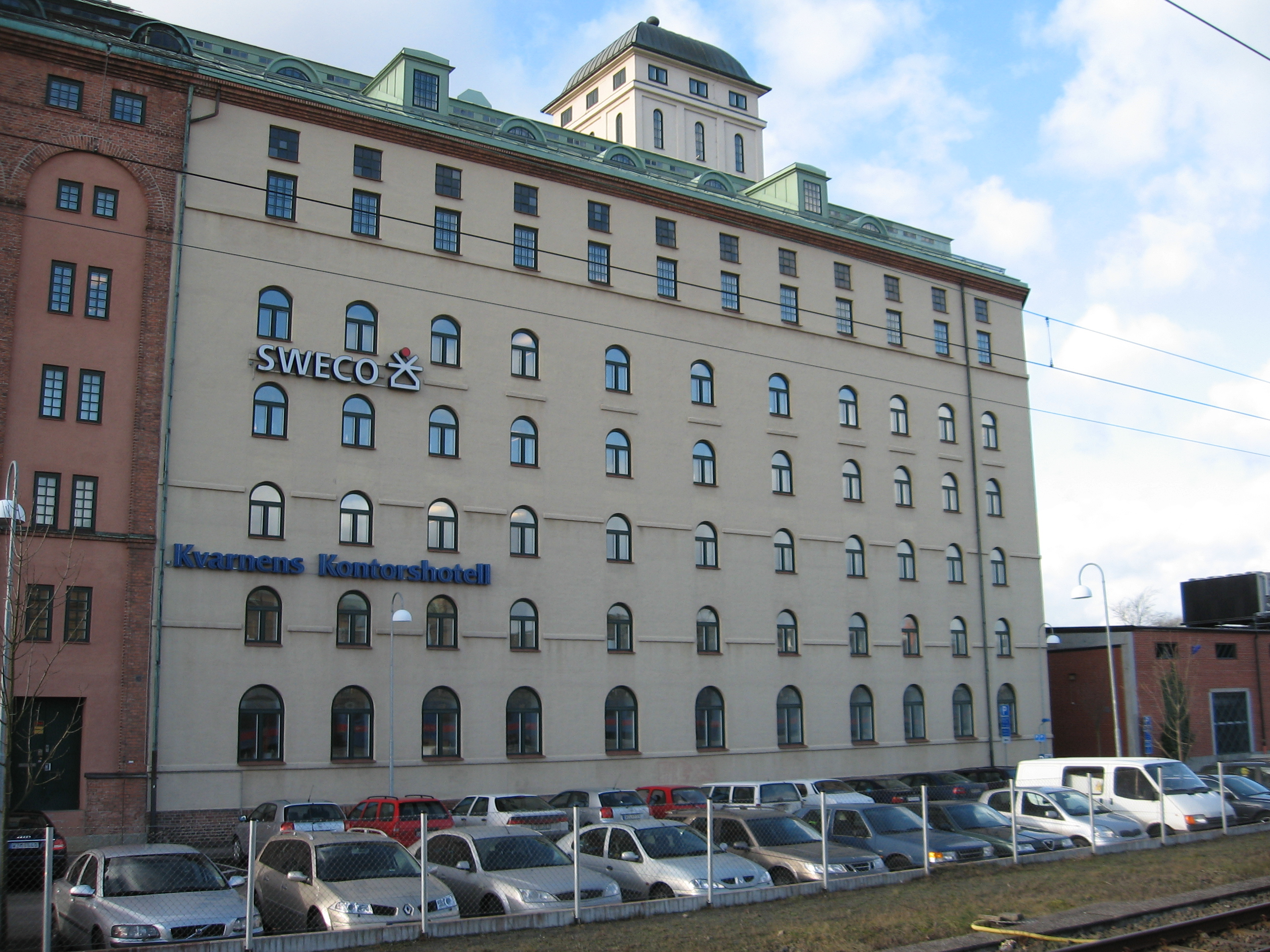
Kvarnen

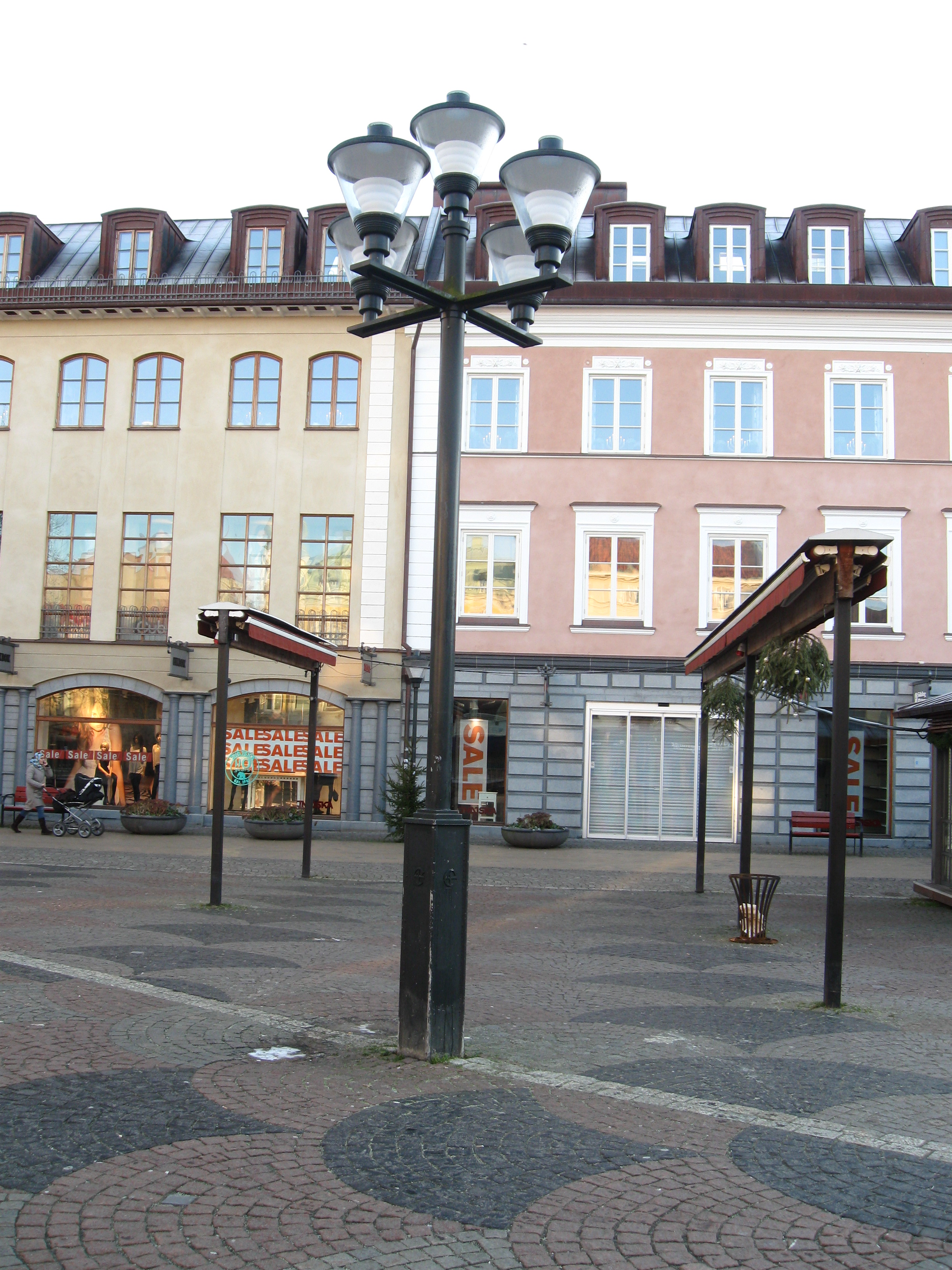
Lilla torg

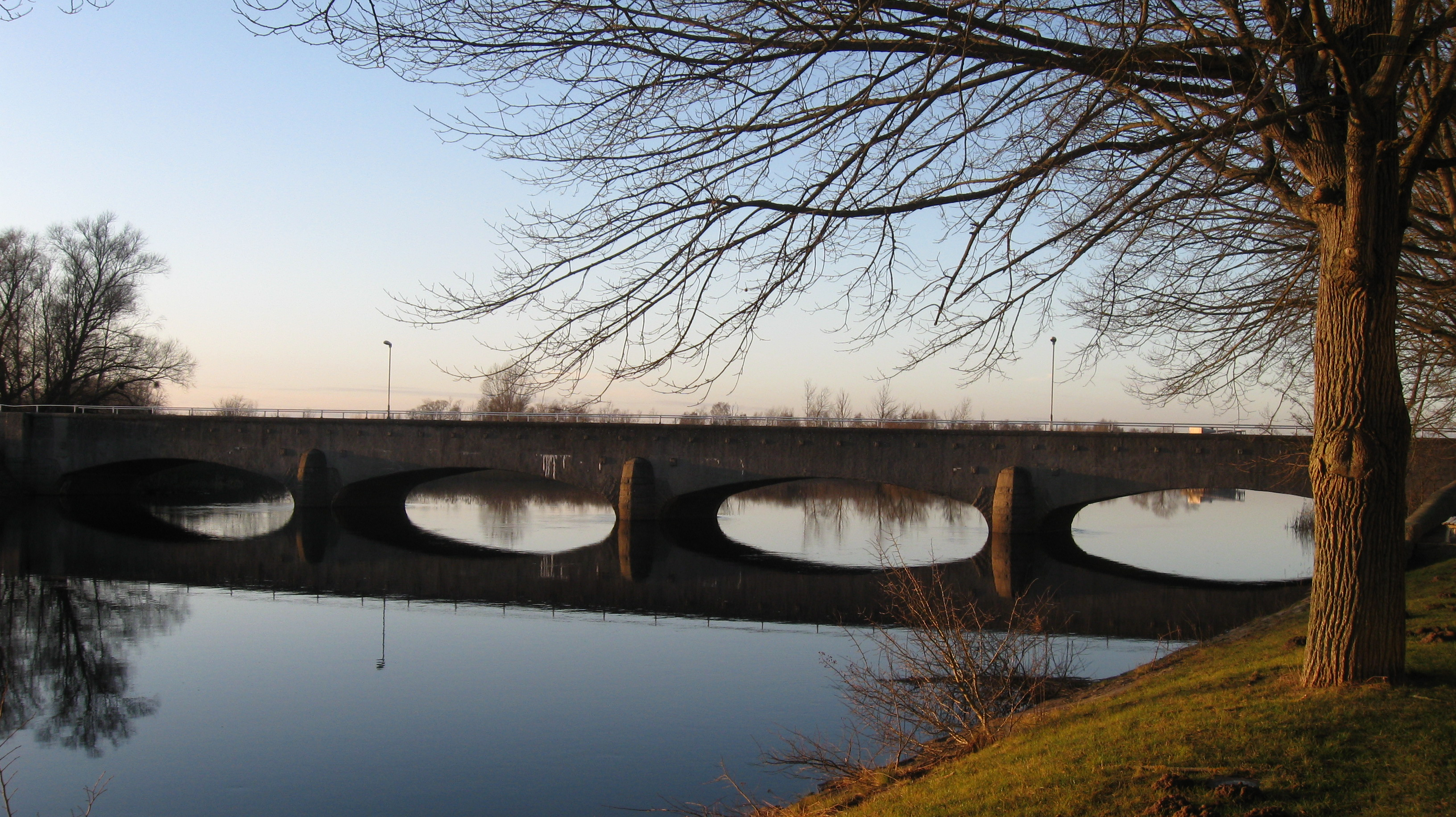
Old railroad bridge across Helge å

== See also ==
- University College of Kristianstad
- Kristianstad County (abolished 1998)
- Kristianstad Tourism
- Kristianstads Vattenrike Biosphere Reserve
