= Battle of Jutas =

1808 battle of the Finnish War

Coordinates: 63°29′44″N 22°31′29″E

- Part of the Finnish War
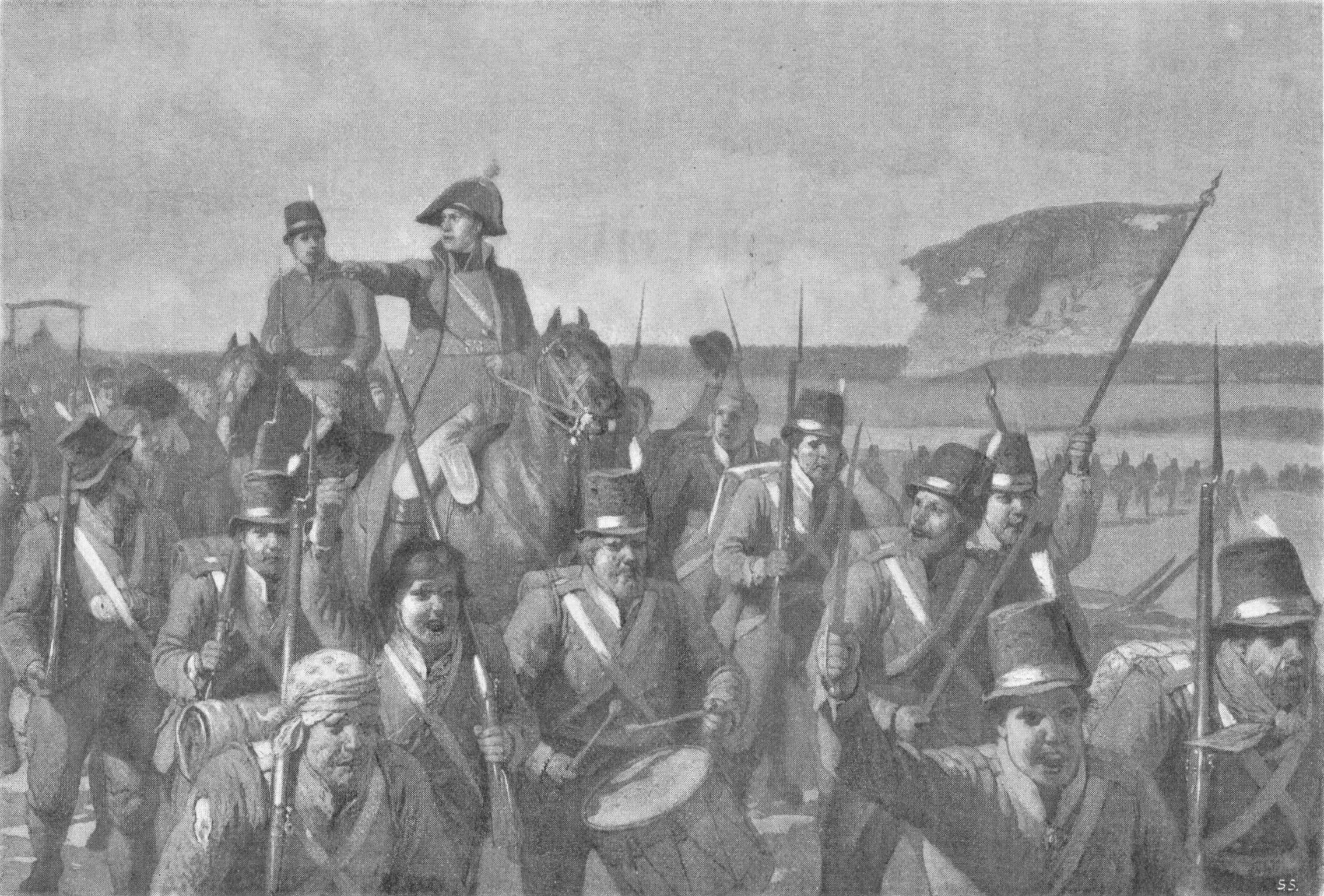
- Döbeln och björneborgarna, by August Malmström
Date	13 September 1808
Location	Jutas, Finland
Result	Swedish victory

Belligerents
Sweden	Russian Empire

Commanders and leaders
Georg Carl von Döbeln	(Russian Empire) Kirill Kazachkovsky

Strength
1,500; 2 guns	1,000–1,500; 2 guns

Casualties and losses
43 killed or wounded	129 killed, wounded or captured

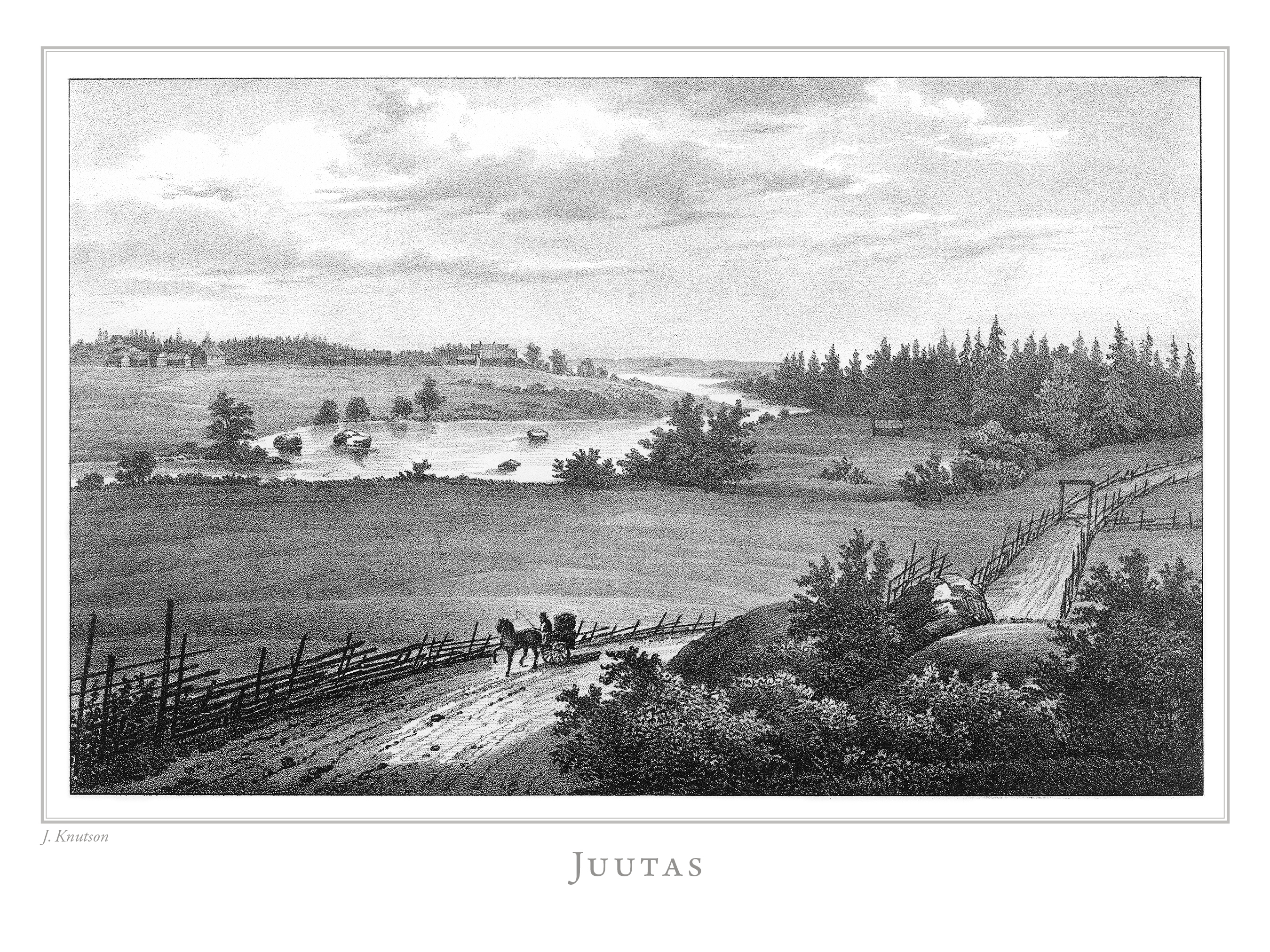
Juutas illustrated in Finland framstäldt i teckningar published 1845-1852.

The Battle of Jutas (Finnish: Juuttaan taistelu, Swedish: Slaget vid Jutas) was fought on Tuesday, 13 September 1808 between Swedish and Russian troops south of Nykarleby in Ostrobothnia, Finland. Before the battle the Swedish army was in retreat after the campaign of the previous summer. The main Swedish force was retreating from Vaasa to Nykarleby. The Russians sent a force to cut off the Swedish retreat. In response the Swedes sent a force under Georg Carl von Döbeln to intercept them. The battle ended in a Swedish victory, but the main Swedish army was defeated in the Battle of Oravais the very next day.

The battle is described in Johan Ludvig Runeberg's Döbeln at Jutas in his epic Finnish National Poem Fänrik Ståls Sägner.

== Bibliography ==
- Hornborg, Eirik (1955). När riket sprängdes: fälttågen i Finland och Västerbotten, 1808–1809 (in Swedish). Stockholm: P. A. Norstedts och Söners Förlag.
