= 1997 UN Transition Mission in Haiti =

United Nations Transition Mission in Haiti
- Abbreviation: UNTMIH
- Formation: 30 July 1997
- Head of Mission: Enrique ter Horst (Special Representative of the Secretary-General)
- Website: https://peacekeeping.un.org/sites/default/files/past/untmih.htm

The United Nations Transition Mission in Haiti (UNTMIH) was a four-month mission which took place between 30 July 1997 and 30 November 1997. UNTMIH was the third United Nations peacekeeping operation in Haiti, and was established by United Nations Security Council Resolution 1123, adopted on 30 July 1997.

== The Mission Mandate ==
The core mission mandate of UNTMIH was to aid in the professionalization of the Haitian National Police (HNP) in order to improve efficiency and support development. This professionalization took place in two primary spheres - police and military. The police element involved the training of specialized units in three core sectors: rapid reaction force, crowd control and Palace security. Part of this process was undertaken through a law enforcement expertise program developed by UNTMIH in collaboration with the United Nations Development Program (UNDP).

The military element involved the protection of United Nations (UN) personnel engaged in ensuring the implementation of the mandate, under the leadership and command of Canadian Force Commander General Robin Gagnon. 300 personnel were deployed: 250 civilian police members, and 50 military personnel and additional volunteer funding based military personnel.

- Civilian personnel were supplied by 11 police-contributing countries - Argentina, Benin, Canada, France, India, Mali, Niger, Senegal, Togo, Tunisia, and the United States.
- Military personnel were supplied by two troop-contributing countries - Canada and Pakistan.

== The Mission Outcome ==
UNTMIH was succeeded by the United Nations Civilian Police Mission in Haiti (MIPONUH) in December 1997, which continued the work of the United Nations in assisting the HNP and withdrew the military section of previous missions. There were various UN Missions in Haiti until 2001 when all peacekeepers and civilian police advisors were removed in the face of ongoing political turmoil, with the exception of a minor humanitarian and political mission. In 2004, the UN redeployed the UN Stabilization Mission in Haiti (MINUSTAH), which lasted over 13 years with the last forces being withdrawn in 2019. The UN no longer has any active peacekeeping operations in Haiti, their involvement consists of a UN Integrated Office in Haiti.

== Background ==
=== Haiti Pre-1997 ===
The 19 July 1997 report on the United Nations Support Mission in Haiti (UNSMIH) by United Nations Secretary-General (UNSG) Kofi Annan outlined the challenges still faced by Haiti and established the basis for UNTMIH.

The UN Report S/1997/564 from the UNSG determined that Haiti was undergoing economic and political hardships despite recent developments. The UNSG argued that Haiti required assistance in creating and supporting democratic organizations, ensuring economic stability and growth, and establishing the Haitian National Police Force (HNP). The UNSG's assessment was affirmed by political leaders in Haiti, who were concerned that in the absence of regular international aid, national security would destabilize.

Prior to UNTMIH, efforts to demobilize and reintegrate the Haitian armed forces into Haiti's civil society were carried out by the US Agency for International Development/Office of Transition Initiatives (USAID/OTI) in association with the International Organization for Migration (IOM). The program lasted between November 1994 and November 1996 and gave way for the establishment of economic, political, security, and social transitions in Haiti. This operation was later transferred to the United Nations.

=== Previous Peacekeeping Operations in Haiti ===
Haiti experienced international intervention, specifically UN peacekeeping operations, since 1993. UNTMIH was preceded by two peacekeeping missions - The United Nations Mission in Haiti (UNMIH) and United Nations Support Mission in Haiti (UNSMIH). UNMIH took place between September 1993 and June 1996, and UNSMIH lasted between June 1996 and July 1997.

UNMIH was successful in ensuring free and fair parliamentary and presidential elections in Haiti in 1995. The mission helped form and train the newly created HNP, and reformed and restored infrastructure such as sanitation, transport, water, public systems and electricity. It also assisted in forming the Haitian government and aiding it with its duties and roles as well as providing space for other UN organisations to succeed in providing facilities. UNSMIH followed UNMIH by promoting the professionalization effectiveness of the HNP by assisting the national forces in creating a stable situation in Haiti, advancing political, economic and infrastructural developments through UN activities.

Although UNSMIH was successful, it was concluded that Haiti still required international support to avoid jeopardizing its significant progress. It was suggested that the succeeding mission, UNTMIH, have a reduced strength in terms of civilian and military personnel supplied by the UN to assist in transitioning, and the military section discard some of its previous roles and focus on assisting the civilian police.

=== Status of the Haitian National Police (HNP) ===
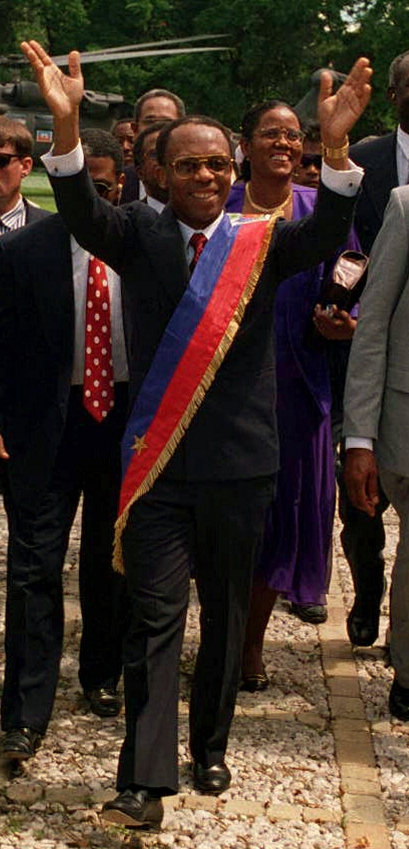
Jean-Bertrand Aristide (born 1953), Haiti's first democratically-elected president.

Jean-Bertrand Aristide became President of Haiti following its first free elections in 1990. However, Aristide was ousted 8 months later by a military uprising by the Haitian Armed Forces (FAd'H) and its intelligence branch, which took control of Haiti from 1991 to 1994. FAd'H was supported by Front for the Advancement and Progress of Haiti (FRAPH), a paramilitary group.

== Deployment ==
=== Mission Rationale ===
In a climate of economic and political instability, the UN concluded that the HNP required support so as to secure a stable environment and aid in its professionalization and development.

Haiti faced multiple challenges in their transition to democracy. Namely, difficult elections where multiple sectors called for government resignation and less than 10% of the electorate cast ballots as Haitians expressed their "impatience with the lack of tangible results". Additionally, the democratic transition process was hindered by party in-fighting and heavy reliance on foreign assistance. This undermined the capacity of authorities to solve Haiti's issues in the eyes of Haitians, resulting in protests, strikes, circulation of weapons, organized crime, and gang warfare.

The HNP were overwhelmed and unable to respond to security threats surrounding elections, as there was a disconnect between the justice system not enforcing the rule of law and police officers taking matters in their own hands. As a result of political instability, Haiti's political leaders expressed the need for steady and strong support from the international community to Haiti.

UNTMIH was thus the first UN peace operation explicitly mandated to "restore democracy". This form of peacebuilding, known as security sector reform, served as a test for multidimensional peacekeeping challenges.

=== The Secretary General's Report to the Security Council ===
In July 1997, the UNSG submitted a report to the United Nations Security Council (UNSC) (S/1997/564), where he stated that despite Haiti's development and progress for establishing a new police force, the efforts were too slow and Haiti still faced economic and political hardships. The UNSG report highlighted that the global consensus in facing those challenges was to strengthen democratic institutions, and participate in the economic growth of Haiti.

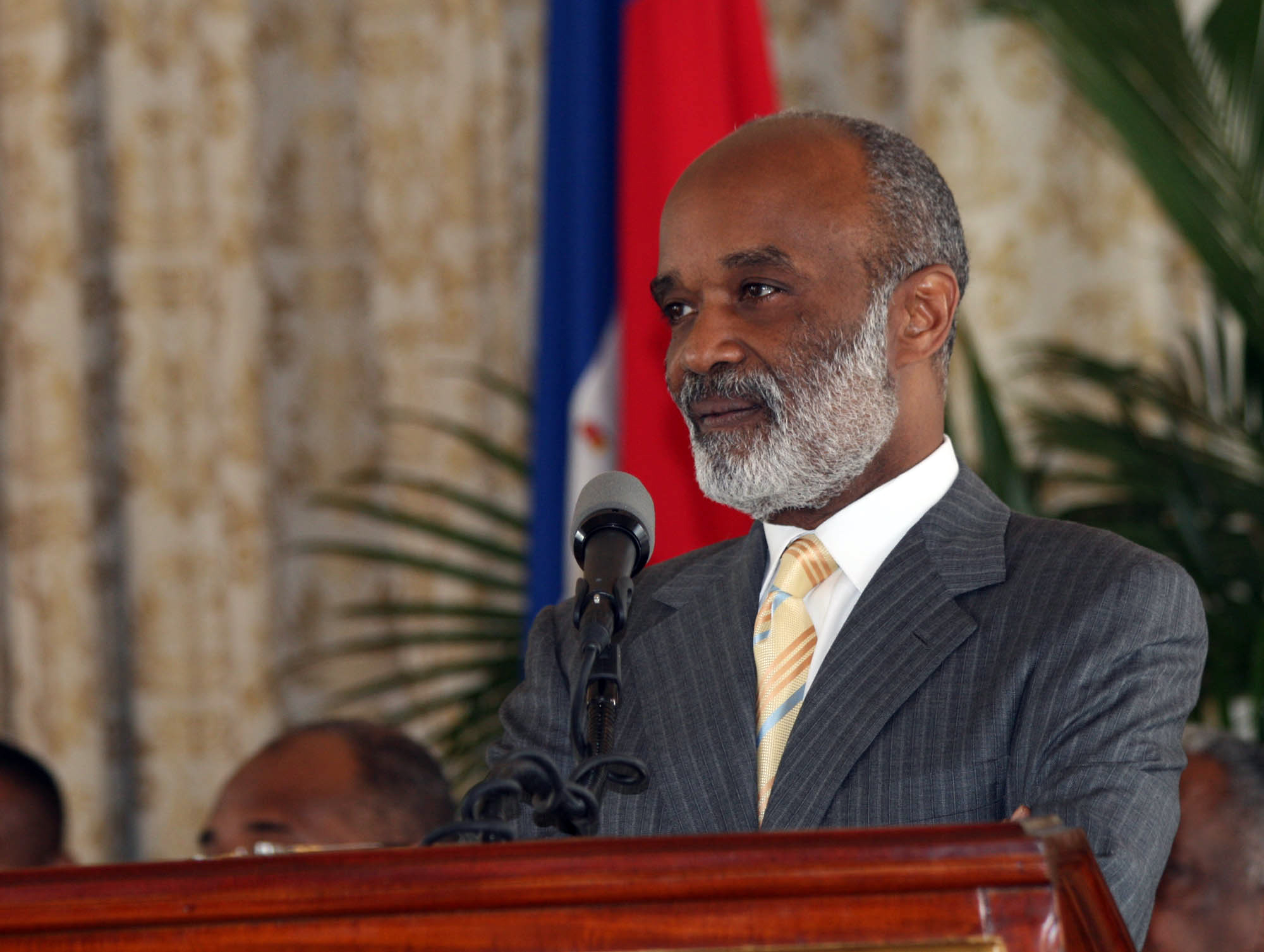
Rene Preval (1943-2017) was a Haitian politician who served twice as president, and once as prime minister under Jean-Bertrand Aristide.

The UNSG's views were shared by Haiti's leader, Mr. Réné Préval, who advocated for long-term steady support from the international community to Haiti. He considered the HNP unready, which constitutes a major security risk in Haiti's context of political and economic instability.

In November 1996, Préval stated that twelve months would be necessary to fully establish a national police force independent from international support. As a result, the UNSG recommended that the UNSC maintain UN support for the HNP for four more months. On this basis, the UNSC resolution and UNTMIH were established.

=== UNSC Resolution ===
In 1997, UNSC Resolution 1123 was passed, extending UN operations in Haiti for a four-month period. The resolution is a statement on the indispensable necessity of international support in building long lasting peace in Haiti. It recognized Haitians' responsibility and agency in national reconciliation, as well as "affirms the importance of a professional, self-sustaining, fully functioning national police force of adequate size and structure, able to conduct the full spectrum of police functions, to the consolidation of democracy and the revitalization of Haiti's system of justice."

The resolution confirmed the extension of the UNTMIH mission into a new set of operations, calling for the maintenance of the previous UNTMIH administration as "the Secretary-General's Special Representative would continue to coordinate activities in Haiti of the United Nations system related to institution-building, national reconciliation and economic rehabilitation."

== The Mission ==
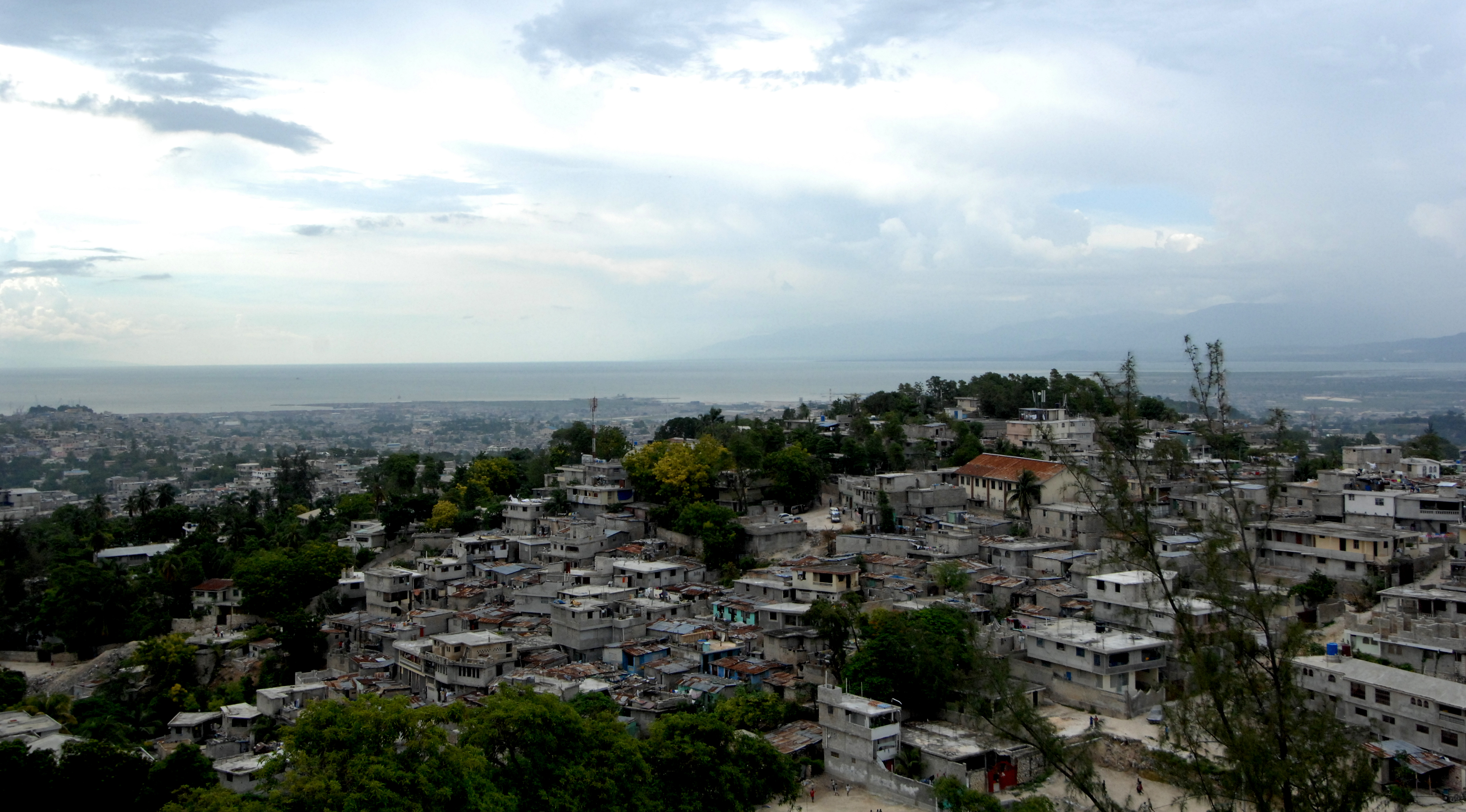
Port-au-Prince, the capital and most populous city of Haiti. Aerial photo taken in 2008.

UNTMIH took place in Port-au-Prince from August 1997 to November 1997. The mission mandate was to assist in the professionalization of the HNP to improve their effectiveness through law enforcement expertise. The UNTMIH police element's tasks included the training of the units in "crowd control, rapid reaction force and Palace security, as well as the protection of areas considered to be of distinct importance". The UNTMIH military unit was in charge of ensuring the safety and freedom of movement of the "UN personnel implementing the mandate."

The mission was led by the Special Representative of the Secretary General (SRSG) and Head of Mission, Enrique ter Horst from Venezuela. The UN force included 250 civilian police personnel supplied by Argentina, Benin, Canada, France, India, Mali, Niger, Senegal, Togo, Tunisia, and United States, and led by the Police Commissioner Colonel Jean-Claude Laparra (France). The 50 military personnel contributors were from Canada and Pakistan and led by Force Commander General Robin Gagnon (Canada).

The mission was financed through the UN benchmark of "assessment in respect of a special account", with a gross budget amounting to $20.6 million assessed from 1 July 1997 to 30 June 1998. This budget encompassed both the UNTMIH and its predecessor, UNSMIH.

== The Aftermath ==
=== Impact of peacekeeping in the region ===
==== First Mandate Explicit About Democratization ====
Peacekeeping operations in Haiti between 1991 and 2001 were viewed as very significant for the history of UN peace operations, as they were the first explicitly mandated to restore democracy. Because of the nature of UNTMIH and subsequent missions, the approaches and policies used had an impact on subsequent peacekeeping operations. As the first UN peace operation designed to restore democracy, Haiti is seen by some scholars as a "test-case for new policies tackling multidimensional peacekeeping challenges".

==== Gendered Aspect of Peacekeeping: Electoral Security ====
In ensuring security in electoral processes, UNTMIH's priority was to provide police and military assistance on election day at polling stations. Certain scholars such as Cynthia Enloe question the lack of consideration for the gendered dimension of security in electoral processes; namely that no attention was given to securing an equal gender distribution in the voting pool. Enloe contends that Haitian women's lack of involvement in elections as candidates and voters is rooted in gender based violence. This sentiment mainly stems from previous violent elections, resulting in women being scared for their security and unwilling to risk participation. Furthermore, as women represent sixty percent of single heads of households in Haiti, putting themselves at risk subsequently puts their families at risk. Thus, inclusion of gender based violence policies in UNTMIH's mission may have promoted just elections in the long-term.

==== Health and Peacekeeping ====
Additionally, certain scholars believe peacekeeping efforts for state-building in Haiti have failed when it comes to health reforms. According to Jones' report, nation building efforts like UNTMIH in Haiti have been unsuccessful, numerous indicators suggesting "HIV prevalence, mortality and morbidity rates" and that "health care delivery systems saw no improvement - or even worsened". Although UNTMIH was focused on police reform, critics have argued that health concerns are linked to a country's political instability, governance challenges, and reliance on financial support from the international community; thus hampering the international community's efforts in rebuilding not only Haiti's health sector, but overall state capacity.
