= Jon Lee Anderson =

American author and journalist (born 1957)

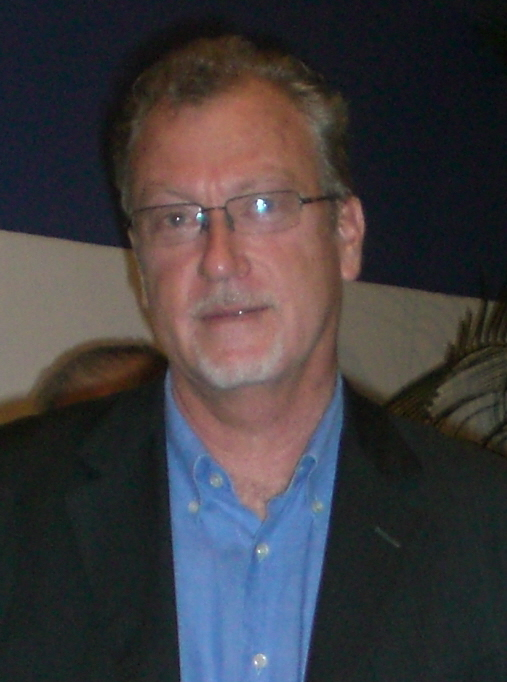
- Anderson in 2010
- Born: January 15, 1957 (age 69)
- Occupations: Author; biographer; international investigative journalist
- Spouse: Erica
- Children: 3

Jon Lee Anderson (born January 15, 1957) is an American journalist, investigative reporter, author, biographer, war correspondent, and staff writer for The New Yorker, reporting from war zones such as Afghanistan, Iraq, Uganda, Palestine, El Salvador, Ireland, Lebanon, Iran, and throughout the Middle East, as well as during Hurricane Katrina and Hurricane Katrina disaster relief efforts with K38 Water Safety as documented in The New Yorker article "Leaving Desire". Anderson has also reported or written for the Lima Times, Harper's Magazine, Life, and The Nation. Anderson has profiled various political leaders, such as Hugo Chávez, Fidel Castro, Che Guevara, and Augusto Pinochet.

== Early life and career ==
Anderson is the son of Joy Anderson, a children's book author and University of Florida professor, and of John Anderson, a diplomat and agricultural adviser for USAID and the Peace Corps. He was raised and educated in South Korea, Colombia, Taiwan, Indonesia, Liberia, England, and the United States. In the early 1970s, he attempted to hitchhike to Togo but ultimately ended up at Las Palmas in the Canary Islands, Spain, for months, unable to secure passage to the African coast. After living on the streets, going without food for days at a time, and coming down with scurvy, he reunited by happenstance with his sister at the city's U.S. Consulate and returned to the United States. His brother is Scott Anderson, a novelist and journalist, and they have co-authored two books.

Anderson began working as a reporter in 1979 for the Lima Times in Peru. During the 1980s, he covered Central America, first for the syndicated columnist Jack Anderson, and later for the Lima Times, Life, The Nation, and Harper's. Anderson is also the author of a biography of Che Guevara called Che Guevara: A Revolutionary Life, first published in 1997. While conducting research for the book in Bolivia, he discovered the hidden location of Guevara's burial from where his skeletal remains were exhumed in 1997 and returned to Cuba.

== Literary reception ==
Che Guevara: A Revolutionary Life has received widespread acclaim, resulted in many reprints, and was named a New York Times Notable Book of the Year, In her 1997 critique of the book, Jane Franklin wrote that "Anderson never quite communicates an understanding of why Guevara remains such a powerful presence. Relying too much on secondary sources for his knowledge of Cuban history, he fails to grasp the nature of the revolution for which Guevara, Fidel Castro and so many others were willing to die." Conversely, Peter Canby wrote that "Anderson does a masterly job in evoking Che's complex character, in separating the man from the myth and in describing the critical role Che played in one of the darkest periods of the cold war. Ultimately, however, the strength of his book is in its wealth of detail." In Washington Monthly, Matthew Harwood praised The Fall of Baghdad, writing that "his crisp and lush prose reads more like a work of literature than like reportage. But for all its literary beauty, the book's real power lies in its narrative strategy." According to Keane Bhatt writing in NACLA Report on the Americas, Anderson's coverage of Chávez and Venezuela was rife with errors and distortions.

== Personal life ==
Anderson resides in Dorset, England, with his wife Erica and their three children: Bella, Rosie and Máximo.

== See also ==
- Jon Lee Anderson bibliography
