= Office of Transition Initiatives =

American government agency

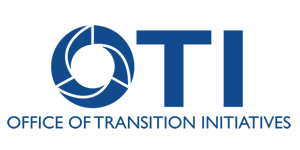

Agency overview
- Formed: 1994
- Headquarters: Washington, D.C.
- Agency executives: Robert Jenkins, Director; Nealin Parker, Deputy Director
- Parent agency: United States Agency for International Development
- Website: usaid.gov

The Office of Transition Initiatives (OTI) is a branch of the USAID's Bureau for Democracy, Conflict, and Humanitarian Assistance (DCHA), created in 1994 to "bridge the gap between emergency disaster relief programs and long-term development assistance".

In 2020, the program had outlays averaging approximately $100 million annually.

== History ==
Lawrence Eagleburger, former Secretary of State under President George H. W. Bush, urged USAID during the Cold War to find ways to move more quickly to address foreign policy priorities in order to stay relevant to national security decision-making. Incoming USAID Administrator J. Brian Atwood, three months after being confirmed, sent a proposal to establish a USAID Office of Crisis and Transition Management, which United States Congress approved. Congress approved language enabling OFDA funds being used for "reconstruction" and earmarked $10 million funds to be used for "transition" activities.

The Office of Transition Initiatives was officially formed in 1994 in order to provide emergency disaster relief programs and long-term development assistance. "Transition programs" were launched in Angola and Haiti that year.

Funding reached $60 million by 2000. In 2001, Congressional appropriators established a separate budgetary line item for "Transitional Initiatives", which were to be used to "support transition to democracy and long-term development of countries in crisis", including "assistance to develop, strengthen, or preserve democratic institutions and processes, revitalize basic infrastructure, and foster the peaceful resolution of conflict".

In the years following the September 11 attacks, funding for the OTI ballooned, reaching nearly $300 million by 2005. Funding sharply fell in the subsequent years, but remained higher than pre-9/11 levels.

The stated mission of the OTI is "to support U.S. foreign policy objectives by helping local partners advance peace and democracy in priority countries in crisis. Seizing critical windows of opportunity, OTI works on the ground to provide fast, flexible, short-term assistance targeted at key political transition and stabilization needs".

== Partnerships ==
The OTI works with a variety of intra-agency and other US government entities, local and international organizations, academic institutions and think tanks, nonprofit and private development firms, and military entities. OTI personnel share information and coordinate with other USAID units offices, including the now-defunct Office of Foreign Disaster Assistance, Conflict Management and Mitigation, and Democracy, Human Rights and Governance, and Regional Bureaus.

== Country Programs ==
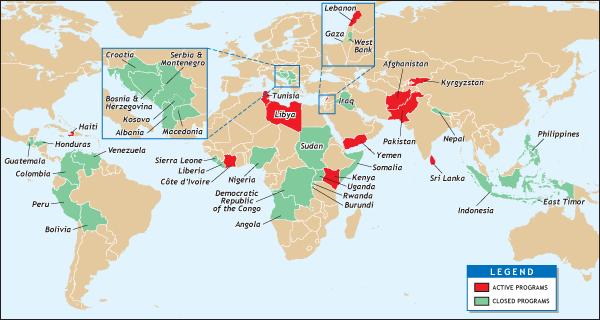
Worldwide Activities as of 2011

=== Afghanistan ===
By 2004, the OTI had supported the launch of Kabul's first privately-owned radio station, and created a network of 32 OTI-funded radio stations throughout the country. The OTI would engage in numerous other media-focused activities, including upgrading shortwave transmitters used throughout the country, and awarding a grant to the UK-based non-profit Institute for War and Peace Reporting to "build the capacity of local print and broadcast journalists".

The OTI also provided support for the country's loya jirgas throughout the 2000s.

In July 2009, the OTI launched the first phase of its program in the now-defunct Islamic Republic of Afghanistan to support the U.S. Government's stabilization and reconstruction initiatives. The objective of the Afghanistan Stabilization Initiative (ASI) was to address instability by fostering and strengthening conditions that build links between the Government of the Islamic Republic of Afghanistan (GIRoA) and local Afghan communities. In collaboration with the International Security Assistance Force (ISAF), the OTI program aimed to support communities in violence-prone areas where stabilization projects are needed most.

In March 2012, OTI began the second phase of its current engagement in Afghanistan. Through the Community Cohesion Initiative (CCI), OTI stated it aimed to improve stability in areas vulnerable to insurgent exploitation in order to create an enabling environment for sustainable peace and traditional development programs by (1) strengthening ties between local actors, customary governance structures, and the GIRoA and (2) empowering community-based resiliencies to mitigate sources of instability.

OTI designed and implemented clusters of small grants. OTI utilizes both "soft" (community-leadership shuras, District Governor outreach visits) and "hard" (small-scale infrastructure) activities which aimed to strengthen linkages between communities vulnerable to insurgent exploitation and the government of the now-defunct Islamic Republic of Afghanistan.

The OTI worked alongside the now-defunct Ministry of Women's Affairs, providing technical support, and funding the rehabilitation of its building complex. The office provided material support to Ariana, a women's rights organization that provided educational courses for women, including during the first Taliban regime, and the Afghan Women’s Network.

=== Bolivia ===
The OTI had a program in Bolivia, which ended in 2007, designed to "reduce tensions and build community cohesion in areas prone to social conflict, reinforce government capacity to respond to citizen needs, and facilitate peaceful, constructive participation in the democratic process". The office provided support to Aymara youth organizations to organize workshops in rural communities about the country's electoral processes. In collaboration with the departmental government of La Paz, OTI programs contracted Motorola to install internet services in rural areas in the region.

=== Bosnia and Herzegovina ===
Beginning in 1996, the OTI worked in Bosnia and Herzegovina to create messages "designed to reshape hardline nationalist attitudes and promote respect for human rights and basic freedoms". The OTI funded journalists, and worked with media outlets in the country to produce public announcements, distribute literature, and conduct call-in shows.

=== Burundi ===
In Burundi, an OTI program in 2005 organized events to promote participation in the country's local elections.

=== Colombia ===
In March 2007, the OTI launched a program to help "establish credibility" for the Colombian government in areas impacted by political violence and narcotrafficking. OTI aims included helping the government support local schools, sports programs, health centers, infrastructure, and to create income-generating projects in local communities. In addition to aiming to build rapport for civilian government representatives, the OTI worked to improve the reputation of Colombia's police and armed forces.

Part of the focus of OTI programs in Colombia was to aid small farmers, who historically lacked advanced irrigation systems and access to large urban markets, like Bogotá.

=== Côte d'Ivoire ===
The OTI engaged in missions in the Côte d'Ivoire following its contested 2010 presidential election. This election was a part of the 2007 Ouagadougou Political Agreement, which outlined steps toward reunifying the country after its division into a government-controlled south and a rebel-controlled north. The accord sought to aid the process of ensuring Côte d'Ivoire's democratic transition, but instead, the situation deteriorated into the Second Ivorian Civil War, where 3,000 people lost their lives, hundreds of thousands were displaced, and an already tense social and political environment throughout the region was inflamed.

To assist the new government of Alassane Ouattara, the OTI created a program aimed to support the priorities of Ouattara's administration. The program stated aim was to work with the government and local groups to identify and respond to community needs, to encourage a peaceful transition, and demonstrate the benefits of a responsive government.

=== Cuba ===
Between 2009 and 2012 the OTI secretly created and funded a Twitter-like service for Cubans called ZunZuneo, initially based on the mobile phone text message service and later with an internet interface. Contractors and front companies in the Cayman Islands, Spain and Ireland were used to provide the service. A longer term objective was to organize "smart mobs" that might "renegotiate the balance of power between the state and society." A database about the subscribers was created, including gender, age, and "political tendencies". At its peak ZunZuneo had 40,000 Cuban users, but the service closed as financially unsustainable when OTI funding was stopped. USAID, however, said that the system was not for political purposes and many parts of news articles about ZunZuneo, such as the smart mobs, were not accurate, and that it actually had close to 70,000 subscribers.

=== Democratic Republic of the Congo ===
Following the Sun City Agreement, the OTI provided material support for numerous radio stations throughout the country. OTI programs in the country provided the UN-founded Radio Okapi with two transmitters and four relay stations to expand its broadcasting reach.

=== Haiti ===
The OTI has operated in Haiti for numerous years, in collaboration with the Haitian government, numerous UN organs, including the International Organization for Migration and the now-defunct MINUSTAH, as well as various local groups. A focus of OTI operations has been areas impacted by gang violence, and attempting to improve infrastructure local to these areas to improve government credibility.

The OTI began its "Haiti Transition Initiative" (HTI) in January 2004, with a dialogue meeting in Cité Soleil around restoring local infrastructure. By 2005, in collaboration with the Haitian government and MINUSTAH, the OTI had backed several labor-intensive infrastructure projects meant to improve government credibility, and provide short-term jobs. Initial OTI-backed programs did not require participants affiliated with gangs to relinquish their weapons, although this was later changed to encourage disarmament.

The OTI sought to support the US government's aims in Haiti through work in Port-au-Prince, Saint Marc, and Cap Haitien. Following the 2010 Haiti earthquake, the OTI embarked on a two-phase program.

Phase 1 of its program, "Earthquake Relief and Recovery", lasted from January 2010 to July 2011. Its stated aims were large-scale cash-for-work projects, rehabilitation of roads and other public infrastructure, public information campaigns related to the 2010s Haiti cholera outbreak and national elections, and providing technical assistance to the Government of Haiti.

Phase 2 of its program, "Transitional Assistance", lasted from August 2011 to September 2013. Its stated aims were to develop community engagement and strategic communications support for US government investments in northern Haiti, livelihoods development and vocational training, restoration and improvement of public spaces, resettlement of earthquake-affected families, and capacity building assistance to local and national government.

=== Honduras ===
The OTI began a program in Honduras in July 2012, with the stated aims of seeking to improve community security, and to increase citizen confidence in government institutions.

=== Iraq ===
In Iraq, the OTI opened various women's centers to offer nutrition and health classes, literacy programs, civic education programs, and internet services.

=== Kenya ===
The OTI launched its Kenya program in June 2008, four months after Kenya's competing political parties adopted a peace accord and power-sharing agreement to stem political and interethnic violence that followed Kenya's contested 2007 elections. Its program's initial stated aims were to "contribute to the overall U.S. goal of supporting peace and stability in the Greater Horn of Africa". The OTI hired Maryland-based company DAI Global as its contractor in Kenya.

In August 2009, OTI re-targeted its objectives to give greater focus to a two-pronged effort supporting the institutional and grassroots reforms outlined in the February 2008 National Accord, including a constitutional review, youth employment, police reform, and land reform. With these new objectives, the OTI sought to support US government policy goals, and to promote a united national identity, and political participation based around political party platforms rather than ethnic identities. Two broad objectives outlined by the OTI included to "enable public institutions to undertake fundamental reforms and to manage instability and uncertainty", and to "mobilize the public, especially the youth and key change agents, to demand accountability and reform".

=== Kosovo ===
The OTI had a program in Kosovo in 1999 with the stated aim of creating local governance institutions. OTI and contractor staff worked in seven municipalities in Kosovo to organize town hall-style civic meetings, and to encourage the creation of "Community Improvement Councils". The OTI stated that "many council members were later elected to public office, bringing moderate democratic voices to Kosovo's often-volatile political life".

=== Kyrgyzstan ===
In May 2010, the OTI launched a program in Kyrgyzstan in response to the country's political crises. Large-scale demonstrations in April led to the ousting of former President Kurmanbek Bakiyev. In the aftermath of the revolution, the OTI stated its aims in Kyrgyzstan were to supporting the democratic process in Kyrgyzstan, and to build trust between its citizens and government.

=== Liberia ===
The OTI began operations in Liberia in February 2004, after the Accra Comprehensive Peace Agreement ended the country's civil war. The office, in collaboration with the Liberian National Elections Commission produced "civic education activities" in five cities throughout the country, attended by 40,000 people, and included the training of 2,200 volunteers to aid in the country's electoral processes.

Following the election of Ellen Johnson Sirleaf, the OTI modified its program to focus more on strengthening the capacity of the Liberian government, including in planning, budgeting, communicating, and coordinating with counterparts. One program funded by the OTI was the construction of a radio studio in the President's office, so that Presidential addresses and interviews could be broadcast throughout the country.

=== Libya ===
The OTI launched a program in Libya in June 2011, amidst the country's civil war, and a US-backed effort to overthrow Muammar Gaddafi. The program's stated aims were to support transitional political processes, particularly elections and constitutional development, supporting reconciliation, and supporting good governance, especially to improve strategic communications and public access to information.

=== Lebanon ===
In late August 2007, following the Cedar Revolution and the 2006 Lebanon War, the OTI launched a three-year program in Lebanon. In the first year of the program, the OTI cleared over $4.1 million in grants. The OTI launched a variety of programs designed to provide youth with an alternative to "political extremism", including programs designed to teach young people how to start non-governmental organizations (NGOs), advocate for peaceful political resolutions, monitor municipal decision making, and engage in political lobbying. OTI programs in Lebanon also taught "civic activists" how to use the internet to create political and cultural blogs and social media accounts. The office also organized various vocational training programs. OTI programs also included the painting of a mural, creating public art installations, and organizing a basketball tournament. The OTI provided material support to musicians and actors in Lebanon to create works promoting peace.

The OTI also engaged in numerous programs targeting Palestinian refugees living in Lebanon designed to improve their relations with local non-Palestinian Lebanese people, and Lebanese government institutions. Near the Ain al-Hilweh refugee camp, the OTI supported the creation of a "youth neighborhood committee" which, in collaboration with the Lebanese Army, local governments, and the Lebanese Red Cross, organized a children's summer camp, an environmental cleanup campaign, and a local festival.

To continue supporting US foreign policy objectives, OTI initiated the Lebanon Civic Support Initiative (LCSI) in January 2010. The program focuses on youth. Through small grants and short-term technical assistance, OTI works with a range of civil society partners to foster leadership and advocacy skills among youth. LCSI has recently expanded programming in northern Lebanon, increasing the number of vocational trainings and community projects and events, and working in two areas that are seeing increasing tensions as a result of the spillover effects from Syria.

=== Nepal ===
Following the Nepalese Civil War's conclusion in 2006, the OTI organized cultural and political events throughout the country. OTI-supported events in Nepal included speeches by government authorities, street dramas, poetry readings, a concert, an exhibit of photographs taken during the 2006 Nepalese revolution, and informational sessions raising awareness of and promoting the country's electoral processes.

=== Pakistan ===
In November 2007, the OTI launched a program in Pakistan's now-defunct Federally Administered Tribal Areas (FATA), which expanded in September 2009 into areas within Khyber Pakhtunkhwa. The stated goals of the OTI program were to build confidence and trust between the government of Pakistan and tribal communities, to support good governance and encourage broad-based community participation in decision making, and to increase access to public information about the Pakistani government's social, economic, and political activities and policies.

Through the OTI program, the FATA Secretariat (FS) produced the FATA Sustainable Development Plan (SDP). The Pakistani government pledged $1 billion to the SDP and is actively soliciting additional funds from donor governments, including the United States. To date, the program has implemented more than 1,600 projects worth $70 million in the region.

=== Peru ===
In Peru, the OTI worked with local governments and the national government to "disseminate information on national issues to the general public that would help legitimize elected leaders". The office funded a nationwide campaign to produce radio and television announcements, which were broadcast over 1,200 times throughout the country. OTI programs in Peru also funded opinion polls and focus group reports.

=== Sri Lanka ===
OTI originally began a program addressing only the Eastern Province of Sri Lanka. The objectives of the program were to support community-focused reintegration and youth and ex-combatants in the province following the Sri Lankan civil war. Following the military defeat of the Liberation Tigers of Tamil Eelam in the north, the program expanded to the Northern Province starting in 2009. The program's stated aims were to strengthen institutional capabilities, support partnerships local government and communities, encouraging livelihood opportunities for at-risk youth and ex-combatants, including vocational, information technology, and language training, rehabilitating small-scale infrastructure projects related to economic recovery, and to create targeted cash-for-work projects to help recently resettled communities recover and jump start livelihoods.

=== Sudan ===
In late 2007, in collaboration with Sudan's Ministry of Rural Development and Water Resources, an OTI program funded the establishment of three "Community Development Centers" in South Kordofan, with the stated intent to "give local authorities a platform to engage communities in discussions on development priorities".

=== Timor-Leste ===
Following the Indonesian occupation of Timor-Leste, the OTI launched programs to fund local short-term construction jobs in Timor-Leste. OTI programs provided temporary employment for about 50,000 people in the country.

=== Tunisia ===
Following the overthrow of Zine El Abidine Ben Ali on January 14, 2011 in the Tunisian revolution, the OTI began a program to promote civil society organizations and their agendas. OTI-supported non-governmental organizations engaged in a documentation of abuses by Ben Ali's government, organized civic education activities, and implemented economic development projects.

=== Uganda ===
In mid-2008, the OTI launched a program in northern Uganda, meant to help the Ugandan government provide services, and "increase the capacity of the media". Part of the program's focus also included aiding the transition of certain authorities within refugee camps to elected local officials.

=== Ukraine ===
The OTI launched a program in Ukraine in 2014 "to strengthen national unity and build support for Ukraine's reforms and Euro-Atlantic trajectory". Following the outbreak of the Russian invasion of Ukraine, the OTI adopted an initiative to focus on "early recovery and resilience in frontline and liberated communities", and "increasing engagement with narratives that reinforce Ukraine's unity and democratic values". In March 2022, the OTI signed an 18 month, $180.2 million contract with US-based firm Chemonics to "support Ukrainian citizens, civil society, and legitimate Government of Ukraine (GOU) representatives". In February 2023, less than a year later, the OTI signed a new contract with Chemonics worth $252 million, with an estimated completion date of September 2026. A 2025 audit by the Office of Inspector General and law firm Williams Adley found that the OTI's programs "engaged local partners in Ukraine", but that "improvements are needed to ensure the accuracy of quantitative data obtained and reported on from sub-implementers".

=== Venezuela ===
The OTI sought to destabilize the Hugo Chávez government by political interference and infiltration according to leaked diplomatic cables. The strategy was initiated in 2006 under then Ambassador William Brownfield. The office funded a national campaign called "Venezuela Convive", which consisted of radio and television announcements, and workshops organized through a network of more than 250 organizations, and 2,500 people. The Venezuela Convive effort received subsequent backing from the World Bank and the Canadian government.

== See also ==
- Color revolution
- Foreign policy of the United States
- NGO-ization
- Regime change
