= K38 =

K38 may refer to:

- K-38 (Kansas highway)
- Apollo et Hyacinthus, an opera by Wolfgang Amadeus Mozart
- HMS Mignonette (K38), a corvette of the Royal Navy
- INS Haifa (K-38), a Hunt-class destroyer of the Israeli Navy
- K-38 trailer, an American military trailer
- K38 Water Safety, an American training organization
- Opel Kadett K38, a German automobile
- Potassium-38, an isotope of potassium
- Smith & Wesson Model 14, originally the K-38 Target Masterpiece
- Smith & Wesson Model 15, originally the K-38 Combat Masterpiece
- Washington County Memorial Airport, in Kansas
