= Jon Lee Anderson bibliography =

List of the published works by or about Jon Lee Anderson, American journalist.

== Books ==
- Anderson, Scott; Anderson, Jon Lee (1986). Inside the League: The Shocking Exposé of How Terrorists, Nazis, and Latin American Death Squads Have Infiltrated the World Anti-Communist League. New York: Dodd, Mead.
- Anderson, Jon Lee; Anderson, Scott (1988). War zones. New York: Dodd, Mead.
- Anderson, Jon Lee (1992). Guerrillas : journeys in the insurgent world. New York: Times Books.
- — (1997). Che Guevara : a revolutionary life. New York: Grove Press.
- — (2002). The lion's grave : dispatches from Afghanistan. New York: Grove Press.
- — (2004). The Fall of Baghdad. New York: Penguin Press.
- — (2025). To Lose a War: The Fall and Rise of the Taliban. New York: Penguin Press.

== Essays and reporting ==
- Anderson, Jon Lee (January 26, 1998). "The plague years". Havana Journal. The New Yorker. p. 62.
- — (September 27, 1999). "The Power of Gabriel García Márquez". The New Yorker. p. 56.
- — (December 11, 2000). "Letter from Baghdad: The Unvanquished". The New Yorker. p. 76.
- — (October 22, 2001). "Letter from Afghanistan: The Warlord". The New Yorker.
- — (June 10, 2002). "Letter from Kabul: The Assassins". The New Yorker. pp. 72–81.
- — (April 21, 2003). "Letter from Baghdad: The Collapse". The New Yorker. p. 70.
- — (November 15, 2004). "Letter from Baghdad: Out on the street". The New Yorker. p. 72.
- — (September 19, 2005). "Letter from New Orleans: Leaving Desire". The New Yorker. Conde Nast.
- — (July 31, 2006). "Letter from Cuba: Castro's Last Battle". The New Yorker. Conde Nast. p. 44.
- — (February 9, 2007). "Being Jalal Talabani, President of Iraq". The Guardian. Guardian News and Media Limited.
- — (July 9, 2007). "Letter from Afghanistan: The Taliban's Opium War". The New Yorker. p. 50.
- — (February 20, 2008). "Fidel's Slow Fade". LA Times. Tribune Company.
- — (October 27, 2008). "Letter from Zimbabwe: The Destroyer". The New Yorker. pp. 10–27.
- — (November 29, 2009). "It's like the Middle Ages… there's no purpose other than living another day". The Observer. Guardian News and Media Limited.
- — (December 14, 2009). "Letter from Mogadishu: The Most Failed State". The New Yorker. p. 64.
- — (August 16, 2010). "Letter from Tehran: After the Crackdown". The New Yorker. p. 62.
- — (April 4, 2011). "The Talk of the Town: Comment: Who Are the Rebels?". The New Yorker. Vol. 87, no. 7. pp. 21–22.
- — (May 16, 2011). "Letter from Khost Province: Force and Futility". The New Yorker. p. 96.
- — (September 1, 2011). "Pashean play". Guernica: A Magazine of Art and Politics.
- — (November 7, 2011). "King of Kings: the Last Days of Muammar Qaddafi". Letter from Libya. The New Yorker. Vol. 87, no. 35. pp. 44–57.
- — (January 28, 2013). "Slumlord : what has Hugo Chávez wrought in Venezuela?". Letter from Caracas. The New Yorker. Vol. 88, no. 45. pp. 40–51.
- — (July 1, 2013). "State of terror : what happened when an Al Qaeda affiliate ruled in Mali". Letter from Timbuktu. The New Yorker. Vol. 89, no. 19. pp. 36–47.
- — (October 21, 2013). "Private eyes : a crime novelist navigates Cuba's shifting reality". Letter from Havana. The New Yorker. Vol. 89, no. 33. pp. 60–71. Leonardo Padura Fuentes.
- — (October 20, 2014). "The Mission : a last defense against genocide". A Reporter at Large. The New Yorker. Vol. 90, no. 32. pp. 60–73.
- — (July 20, 2015). "Opening for business : a former Marielito positions himself as an entrepreneur in the new Cuba". Letter from Havana. The New Yorker. Vol. 91, no. 20. pp. 22–28.
- — (February 1, 2016). "Aftershocks : is the earthquake-stricken country's flamboyant President a savior or a rogue?". Letter from Haiti. The New Yorker. Vol. 91, no. 46. pp. 30–37. Michel Martelly
- — (August 8–15, 2016). "The distant shore : in Peru, a killing brings an isolated tribe into contact with the outside world". A Reporter at Large. The New Yorker. Vol. 92, no. 24. pp. 40–51.
- — (May 1, 2017). "Out of the jungle : after half a century of civil war, former guerillas seek a return to society". Letter from Colombia. The New Yorker. Vol. 93, no. 11. pp. 28–33.
- — (August 17, 2020). "Wanderlust: Looking for trouble and musk oxen in Alaska". Personal History. The New Yorker. Vol. 96, no. 23. pp. 40–49.
- — (July 24, 2023). "A Land Held Hostage". Letter from Port-au-Prince. The New Yorker. Vol. 99, no. 21. pp. 42–53.
- — (January 15, 2024). "The Long Way". Personal History. The New Yorker. pp. 12–19.

== Interviews ==
- "Questions for: Jon Lee Anderson". The New York Times. May 4, 1997.
- Smith, Martin (December 7, 2003). "Beyond Baghdad: Interview with Jon Lee Anderson". Frontline. PBS.
- Jon Lee Anderson: The Fall of Baghdad. Meet the Author (video). Meet the Author Ltd. 2004.
- Birnbaum, Robert (October 18, 2004). "Robert Birnbaum v. Jon Lee Anderson". The Morning News. The Morning News LLC.
- A talk with Jon Lee Anderson (mp3). Melbourne: La Trobe University. May 26, 2008.
- ""No veo a Colombia distinta a Afganistán": Jon Lee Anderson" [I do not see Colombia different from Afghanistan: Jon Lee Anderson]. Cambio (in Spanish). Colombia: Gabriel García Márquez. November 2, 2008.
- Aksan, Cihan; Bailes, Jon (May 2010). "On Che Guevara: An Interview with Jon Lee Anderson". State of Nature.
- "TehelkaTV interview on Che's Legacy and covering insurrections". February 2011.
