= Development Experience Clearinghouse =

USAID repository

The Development Experience Clearinghouse (DEC) was the U.S. Agency for International Development’s (USAID) online repository for materials documenting its work in international humanitarian aid and economic, agricultural, trade, health, and democratic development.

Established in 1975, the DEC held over 168,000 documents at its peak, with more than 157,000 of them available electronically. The collection included oral histories of retired USAID staff, program planning documents, and descriptions of past USAID-sponsored projects.

The DEC also produced a biweekly electronic newsletter, the DEC Express, and maintained offices in the Ronald Reagan Building and International Trade Center in Washington, D.C.

In early 2025, the DEC was taken offline shortly before the shutdown of USAID, and the official archive is no longer publicly available. Independent efforts have since attempted to reconstruct portions of the collection using publicly archived data.
