= ZunZuneo =

Online social networking service in Cuba

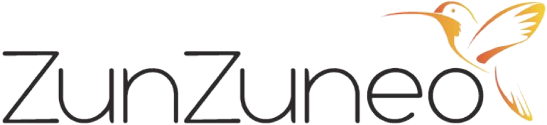
- Website type: Social networking service, microblogging
- Available in: Multilingual
- Founded: 2010
- Dissolved: 2012
- Area served: Cuba
- Owner: United States Agency for International Development
- Commercial: Yes
- Users: About 60,000
- Current status: Dissolved

ZunZuneo was an online social networking and microblogging service created by the United States Agency for International Development (USAID) and marketed to Cuban users. Following recommendations by the Commission for Assistance to a Free Cuba, it was covertly developed as a long-term strategy to encourage Cuban youths to revolt against the nation's government, fomenting a political spring. The service officially began operating in 2010 but ran out of money two years later. Because of its clandestine and subversive nature, it became a target of criticism.

== History ==
=== Origins and funding ===
The word "zunzuneo" is Cuban slang for a hummingbird's call. The origins of ZunZuneo result from USAID allocating millions of dollars concealed as humanitarian funds designated for Pakistan. Contractors funded by USAID "set up a byzantine system of front companies using a Cayman Islands bank account, and recruit[ed] unsuspecting executives who would not be told of the company's ties to the U.S. government", according to an Associated Press (AP) report which traced the origin of the service. Private companies Creative Associates International and Mobile Accord were reported to have designed the network. According to Creative Associates, the idea arose after they were provided 500,000 stolen Cuban cellphone numbers from a "source" who said they were available on the black market. NiteMedia, an organization in Nicaragua run by a relative of a Creative Associates International manager, was chosen as a subcontractor. Creative Associates International won the contract for their proposal in October 2008, and grant funding for ZunZuneo began in June 2009.

ZunZuneo was founded in 2010, shortly after the arrest of USAID contractor Alan Gross in Cuba. The network, dubbed the "Cuban Twitter", reached about 60,000 subscribers. The initiative also appears to have had a surveillance dimension, allowing "a vast database about Cuban ZunZuneo subscribers, including gender, age, 'receptiveness' and 'political tendencies'" to be built, with the AP noting that such data could be used in the future for "political purposes". This data would then be used for microtargeting efforts towards anti- and pro-government users. The developers aimed to use "non-controversial content", such as sports and music, to build up subscribers and then introduce political messages through social bots to encourage dissent in an astroturfing initiative.

The United States Department of State reportedly attempted to have Twitter co-founder Jack Dorsey assume network leadership. ZunZuneo was discontinued in 2012 since funding was not self-sustaining and due to legal issues involved with paying the Cuban government that were inconsistent with U.S. law.

=== Investigations ===
The AP released an exposé on ZunZuneo in April 2014 after reviewing thousands of document pages about its function. Following the report, the U.S. government acknowledged that it funded the service but denied that it was a covert program. According to a USAID spokesperson, the Government Accountability Office reviewed the program in 2013 and found it to have been executed in compliance with U.S. law. The United States Senate Committee on Foreign Relations requested documents about the program from USAID. An Office of Inspector General, U.S. Agency for International Development review from December 2015 said that "the Commission for Assistance to a Free Cuba (CAFC) advocated measures to hasten the regime's downfall, including efforts to bypass the Cuban Government's restrictions on communication" and that "ZunZuneo ... was designed to carry out CAFC's recommendations to foster democracy."

=== Piramideo ===
In 2014, the U.S. Office of Cuba Broadcasting announced that it was creating a ZunZuneo successor, Piramideo, which could send group messages to an entire contact for the price of one text message. The platform also spread unsolicited anti-communist, pro-United States messages and fake news promoting protests that never occurred.

== Reactions ==
United States relations director Josefina Vidal of the Cuban Foreign Ministry described ZunZuneo as "illegal" and part of "subversive programs" enacted by the United States towards Cuba in an interview with NPR.

Investigative journalist Jon Lee Anderson described the response from the United States as "bald-faced disingenuousness", saying that "there seems to be little doubt that ZunZuneo functioned as a secret intelligence operation aimed ultimately at subversion." Americas Quarterly said the project violated Cuban law and citizens' privacy rights. Mark Hanson of the Washington Office on Latin America said those who supported the project were "the ones to seek the regime change—they believe in initiatives to destabilize the [Cuban] government", describing ZunZuneo as "wasteful". The Nation criticized the U.S. government's use of USAID, saying it should participate in genuine assistance "without the hidden hand of government manipulation or a hidden agenda of regime change".

The project received various comparisons. The Washington Post compared the project to previous assassination attempts on Fidel Castro. In his book In Their Own Best Interest: A History of the U.S. Effort to Improve Latin Americans, Lars Schoultz likened the ZunZuneo affair to Russian interference in the 2016 United States elections.

In his conclusion to his 2017 book, We Are Data: Algorithms and the Making of Our Digital Selves, John Cheney-Lippold writes that "As everything we do becomes datafied, everything we do becomes controllable", citing ZunZuneo as a "malicious" example of how governments can influence the public.

== See also ==
- Cuba–United States relations
- Operation Mongoose
- United States involvement in regime change in Latin America
