= Office of Foreign Disaster Assistance =

American unit in USAID

The Office of U.S. Foreign Disaster Assistance (OFDA) was an organizational unit within the United States Agency for International Development (USAID) charged by the President of the United States with directing and coordinating international United States government disaster assistance. USAID merged the former offices of OFDA and Food for Peace (FFP) in 2020 to form the Bureau for Humanitarian Assistance (BHA).

== History ==
After failed attempts to respond to the 1963 Skopje earthquake in Yugoslavia and the eruption of the Irazú Volcano in Costa Rica, the U.S. government decided to create a central, coordinating agency to lead U.S. international disaster response efforts. In 1964, OFDA was established under the Foreign Assistance Act with the appointment of a Foreign Disaster Relief Coordinator within USAID.

In 1975, the Foreign Assistance Act was amended with a notwithstanding clause in the International Development and Food Assistance Act, allowing the President to bypass any bureaucratic procedures that might hinder a timely response. The "notwithstanding" clause gives OFDA the expedited authority to make grants and contracts without having to go through the lengthy procurement procedures required for other USAID offices. In addition, the clause allows OFDA to work in countries where other U.S. government agencies are not present.

The organization is mandated to save lives, alleviate human suffering, and reduce the economic and social impact of humanitarian emergencies worldwide.

== Disaster response ==
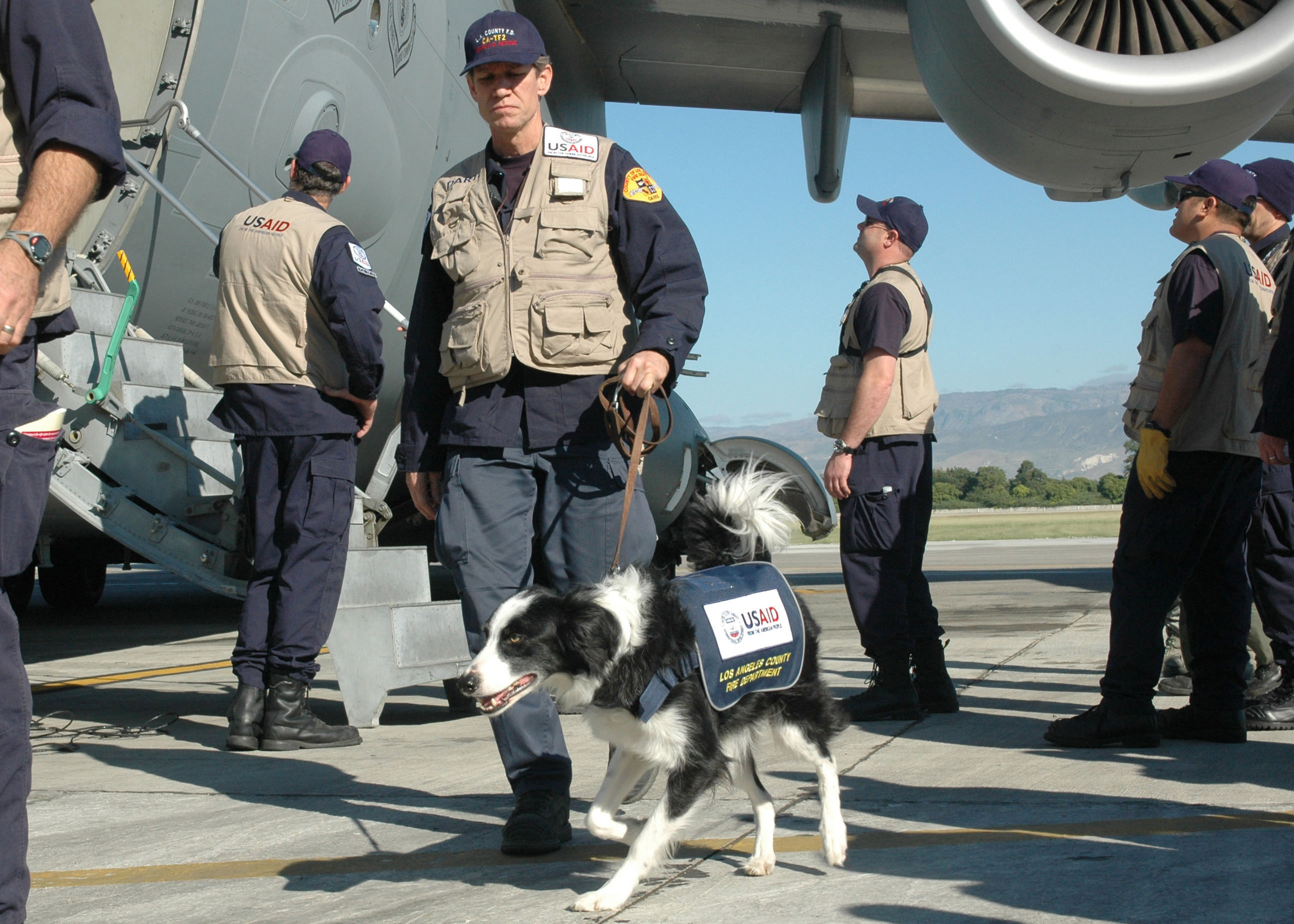
Canine search working for USAID/OFDA on their way to Haiti to conduct rescue operation after the 2010 Haiti earthquake.

Each year, OFDA responds to dozens of international disasters, including rapid-onset events, such as earthquakes, floods, storms, tsunamis, and volcanoes; slow-onset emergencies, such as prolonged drought leading to food insecurity; and complex emergencies stemming from political crises, social unrest, or armed conflict.

An official disaster declaration allows OFDA to provide humanitarian assistance to affected populations. OFDA closely coordinates all activities with the U.S. embassy or USAID mission in the affected country. OFDA also conducts humanitarian assessments to determine if and when USG humanitarian assistance may be appropriate. OFDA's response depends on the scale of the event and the needs of affected communities and may comprise a range of activities, including one or more of the following:

- Immediate provision of up to $50,000—an amount designated as the Disaster Assistance Authority—to the U.S. Embassy or the USAID Mission in the affected country for the local purchase of relief supplies or as a contribution to a relief organization;
- Deployment of a Disaster Assistance Response Team (DART) or other emergency teams to disaster-affected areas to conduct assessments, determine additional needs, deliver relief supplies, provide technical assistance, and/or recommend proposals for funding;
- Activation of an on-call Response Management Team (RMT) in Washington, D.C.;
- Procurement, transportation, and distribution of emergency relief supplies, such as plastic sheeting, water containers, water purification units, blankets, and health supplies, from one of OFDA's three regional warehouses; and/or
- Support for relief and rehabilitation activities through grants to implementing organizations, including international and local non-governmental organizations (NGOs), U.N. agencies, or international organizations.

Examples of OFDA-funded activities include purchasing local relief supplies for populations in remote locations, managing and/or supporting primary health care programs, implementing cash-for-work activities, providing seeds and tools to displaced farmers, or restoring water systems in drought-stricken countries. In addition, OFDA often prepositions personnel and relief supplies to prepare for a foreseeable disaster, such as a hurricane or volcanic eruption.

OFDA possesses the authority to request exemptions from USG regulations when doing so will expedite the provision of emergency assistance, as well as to borrow money from other USAID accounts when OFDA requires additional funding, although use of the special authorities is rare.

== Transition from relief to development ==
As an emergency response transitions from addressing immediate needs to longer-term rehabilitation and reconstruction activities, OFDA works with other offices within USAID's Bureau for Democracy, Conflict, and Humanitarian Assistance (DCHA) and USAID's regional bureaus and overseas missions—among other partners—to ensure a seamless hand-off of assistance from relief to development entities.

== Disaster risk reduction ==
In addition to disaster response activities, OFDA also supports a range of disaster risk reduction (DRR) projects designed to minimize the impact of natural hazards and conflict in emergency-prone countries and enhance the resilience of affected communities. OFDA's DRR activities work to strengthen communities' resilience to and recovery from shocks and promote the sharing of technology and expertise between the United States and the affected country by building partnerships with national emergency response agencies. OFDA frequently implements DRR activities in conjunction with technical organizations, such as the U.S. Geological Survey (USGS), U.S. Forest Service (USFS), Pan American Health Organization (PAHO), and other offices within USAID. OFDA staff carefully monitor grantee programs to ensure that resources are used wisely and to determine whether projects need to be adapted to changing conditions.

== Fiscal Year 2010 response ==
In FY 2010, OFDA responded to 73 disasters in 56 countries to assist tens of millions of disaster-affected people. The response to one of these disasters—the January 12, 2010, Haiti earthquake—constituted one of the largest in OFDA's history. In Africa, OFDA assisted populations affected by complex humanitarian emergencies, flooding, food security crises and drought, lead poisoning, a cholera outbreak, a cyclone, refugee returns, and earthquakes. Countries in the Asia and Pacific region experienced flooding, complex humanitarian emergencies, tropical cyclones, landslides, earthquakes, volcanoes, tsunamis, and a winter emergency. In Europe, the Middle East, and Central Asia (EMCA), OFDA assisted populations affected by complex emergencies, floods, wildfires, and food insecurity. Flooding affected populations across the Latin America and Caribbean (LAC) region, where OFDA also responded to wildfires, storms, a volcano, and earthquakes.

Following the onset of each of these disasters, affected populations required immediate humanitarian assistance, including safe drinking water, health care, sanitation services, emergency shelter, emergency relief supplies, and food security interventions. In countries experiencing complex emergencies, OFDA partners worked to protect vulnerable civilians, increase the sustainability of longer-term humanitarian responses, and facilitate the transition to development assistance in relevant countries.

OFDA provided more than $855 million for disaster response programs to support agriculture and food security, economic recovery and market systems, health, nutrition, protection, shelter and settlements, and WASH interventions; humanitarian coordination and information management programs; search and rescue efforts; and logistical support and emergency relief commodities. In FY 2010, OFDA deployed Disaster Assistance Response Teams (DARTs) and other emergency teams to Brazil, Chile, China, Colombia, El Salvador, Guatemala, Haiti, Indonesia, Laos, Madagascar, Mexico, Niger, Pakistan, the Philippines, Samoa, the Solomon Islands, and Vietnam. Of the more than $855 million provided in response to emergencies, $9 million supported DRR programs, and $181 million supported disaster response programs with DRR components. In addition to allocating more than $855 million for disaster response programs, OFDA provided more than $59 million for regional and global disaster support and more than $59 million for operations and program support.
