= United States Agency for International Development =

De jure independent foreign aid agency

- Seal of USAID

- Flag of USAID

- Wordmark of USAID

Agency overview
- Formed: 1961
- Preceding agency: International Cooperation Administration
- Dissolved: 2025 (de facto; the remaining 17% of USAID programs were rolled into the State Department, rendering it unoperational, but USAID has not been dissolved as an agency.)
- Headquarters: Ronald Reagan Building Washington, D.C., U.S.
- Motto: "From the American people"
- Employees: >100 (February 2026); Approximately 74 direct-hire employees (November 2025)
- Annual budget: $34 billion (FY 2025 total budgetary resources)
- Agency executive: Bill Woolf, Acting Administrator
- Website: usaid.gov

The United States Agency for International Development (USAID) is a statutory agency of the executive branch of the United States federal government. Founded in 1961, it was formerly the world's largest foreign aid agency. After major cutbacks, its remaining functions were transferred to the United States Department of State on July 1, 2025.

USAID was established to counter the influence of the Soviet Union during the Cold War by means of soft power. In 2025, the second Trump administration ended 83% of overall projects, transferred the rest to the State Department, and planned to disband the agency. However, USAID had been reorganized by the United States Congress as an independent agency in 1998 and can only be formally abolished by an act of Congress. As such, it legally still exists. (Note: In addition, budget requests, the Office of Inspector General, and court filings have continued to acknowledge USAID's legal existence.)

From 2001 to 2024, USAID had an average budget of $23 billion a year and missions in over 100 countries in areas as diverse as global health, environmental protection, and democratic governance. In the twenty years from 2001 to 2021, USAID programs were estimated to save between 4.1 and 4.7 million lives each year.

== History ==
In August 1953, President Eisenhower reorganized country offices as "United States Operations Missions" (USOMs). Congress passed the Foreign Assistance Act on September 4, 1961, which reorganized U.S. foreign assistance programs and mandated the creation of an agency to administer economic aid. The goal of this agency was to counter Soviet influence during the Cold War and to advance U.S. soft power through socioeconomic development. USAID's predecessor agency was already substantial, with 6,400 U.S. staff in developing-country field missions in 1961. Except for the peak years of the Vietnam War, 1965–70, that was more U.S. field staff than USAID would have in the future, and triple the number USAID has had in field missions in the years since 2000. (Note: Data from USAID reports, "Distribution of Personnel as of June 30, 1949 thru 1976", "Supporting the USAID Mission", and the "USAID Staffing Report to Congress" of 2016.)

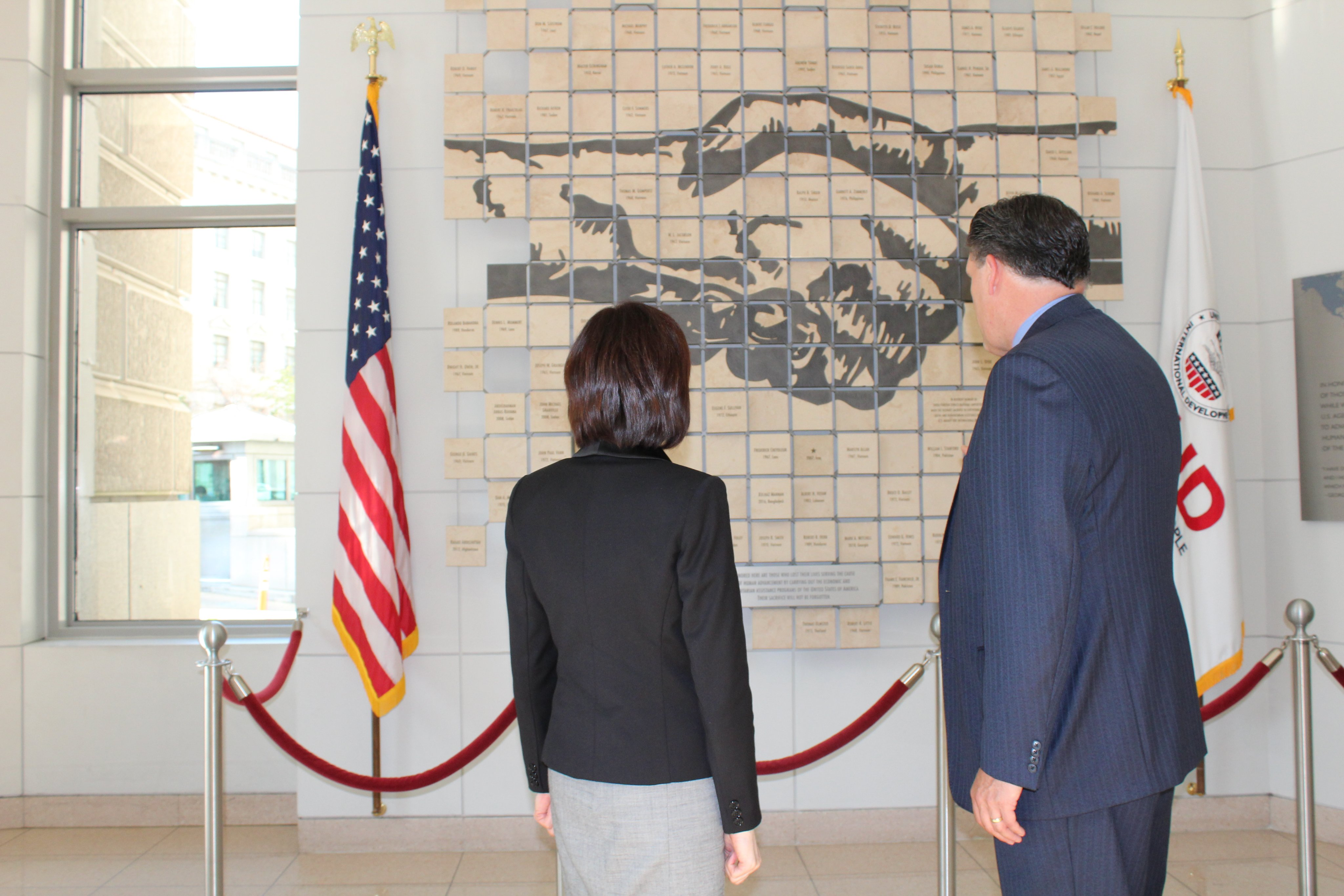
The "Memorial Wall" honors as "fallen national heroes" 99 nominated USAID officers killed in the line of duty. It was previously located in the lobby of the Ronald Reagan Building, and was reportedly removed by DOGE employees and subsequently misplaced.

After his inauguration as president on January 20, 1961, John F. Kennedy created the Peace Corps by executive order on March 1, 1961. On March 22, he sent a special message to Congress on foreign aid, asserting that the 1960s should be a "Decade of Development" and proposing to unify U.S. development assistance administration into a single agency. He sent a proposed "Act for International Development" to Congress in May and the resulting "Foreign Assistance Act" was approved in September, repealing the Mutual Security Act. In November, Kennedy signed the act and issued an executive order tasking the secretary of state to create, within the State Department, the "Agency for International Development" (or A.I.D.: subsequently re-branded as USAID), (Note: The names of predecessor agencies often continued in popular usage. In Vietnam in the 1960s, it was common to refer to A.I.D.'s office as "USOM," while in Peru A.I.D. telephone operators continued in the 1960s to answer calls saying "Punto Cuatro" (Point Four).) as the successor to both ICA and the Development Loan Fund. (Note: In 1966, the UN would also integrate its EPTA and the Special Fund into a new agency, the UN Development Program, or UNDP.) With these actions, the U.S. created a permanent agency working with administrative autonomy under the policy guidance of the State Department to implement, through resident field missions, a global program of both technical and financial development assistance for low-income countries. (Note: The Fulbright educational and cultural exchange program was also strengthened by the Fulbright-Hays Act in September 1961.) After this transition, USOMs continued to exist for a time as an element of USAID.

In 1998, Congress established USAID as a functionally independent executive agency with the Foreign Affairs Reform and Restructuring Act, which gave the president 60 days to abolish or reorganize USAID. President Bill Clinton chose the second option and reorganized USAID, which retained its independence from the U.S. Department of State, although its administrator must "report to and be under the direct authority and foreign policy guidance of the Secretary of State".

During the Trump administration's first term, his daughter Ivanka Trump, who served as Advisor to the President, used over $11,000 from USAID in 2019 to purchase video recording and reproducing equipment for a White House event. Both Ivanka and then-first lady Melania Trump had publicly praised USAID's work during the first Trump administration. Melania Trump visited Africa in 2018, speaking about USAID's efforts and stating, "We care, and we want to show the world that we care, and I've partnered and am working with USAID." Ivanka Trump also toured Africa on behalf of USAID, lauding her father's creation of the "Women's Global Development and Prosperity" initiative and emphasizing its alignment with U.S. national security interests.

In the 21 years from 2001 to 2021 inclusive, USAID funding saved an estimated 92 million persons, with a range between 86 and 98 million. This is an estimated range of between 4.1 and 4.7 million lives saved per year. Among these lives saved were an estimated 30 million children younger than five, with a range between 26 and 35 million. This is an estimated range of between 1.2 and 1.7 million per year in the subset of children under five saved.

=== Trump administration cuts ===
On January 24, 2025, during the Trump administration's second term, President Donald Trump ordered a near-total freeze on all foreign aid. Multiple lawsuits were filed against the Trump administration alleging that these actions were not within its powers without congressional authorization.

Secretary of State Marco Rubio issued a waiver for humanitarian aid, and a key issue developed over whether this waiver was actually translating into aid flowing. On March 10, 2025, Marco Rubio announced that the Trump administration had concluded its review, and 83% of USAID's programs would be canceled, involving approximately 5,200 contracts.

The impact of the actions taken by the USAID on global health is wide-reaching. A study published in June 2025 estimated that funding cuts and the abolition of the agency could result in more than 14 million preventable deaths by 2030, including 4.5 million children under 5 years old. Another estimate (by epidemiologist and health economist Brooke Nichols) is that over a period of one year from when they began, the cuts will result in the deaths of as many as 262,915 adults and 518,428 children.

==== Absorption by State Department ====
On March 28, 2025, U.S. secretary of state Rubio notified Congress that USAID would be dissolved and absorbed into the U.S. State Department. Since July 1, 2025, USAID's operations have ceased and U.S. foreign assistance has now been administered by the U.S. State Department.

USAID employees were not automatically transferred. Instead, the State Department is engaging in a "separate and independent hiring process".

==== Competition with China ====
As USAID projects were withdrawn in 2025, Chinese officials were reported to be expressing willingness to fill resultant funding gaps in some countries, increasing concerns in the US that the US was ceding influence while China also continues its global infrastructure investment through the Belt and Road Initiative.

==== Disaster response ====
Regarding the March 28 Myanmar earthquake, a U.S. State Department spokesperson stated that the United States is working through local partners in Myanmar, and said, "The success in the work and our impact will still be there." However, a former USAID mission head in Myanmar said, "This is the new normal. This is what it looks like when the United States sits on the international sidelines, when the United States is a weaker international player, when it cedes the space to other global players like China."

== Purposes ==
USAID's decentralized network of resident field missions was drawn on to manage U.S. government programs in low-income countries for various purposes. (Note: Each particular official statement of USAID's goals is specific to the U.S. foreign-policy emphases of the moment the statement is made. The best official statement relevant to the most recent era was in USAID's 2004 "White Paper", reaffirmed in high-level USAID policy documents in 2006 and 2011. (See the references USAID authored at the end of this article.) To give a perspective of USAID's goals that are as general as possible, the list of goals in this article subsumes one of the goals from the 2004 White Paper, "Strengthen fragile states," whose emphasis as understood at the time was on Iraq and Afghanistan, into a more general goal, "U.S. national interests", together with one of the White Paper's other goals, "Support strategic states". State fragility is understood to be one of the development issues addressed under this article's "Socioeconomic development" goal. On the other hand, the White Paper's goal, "Provide humanitarian relief", is divided in this article into two goals, both of which are humanitarian: "Disaster relief" (which may assist victims at various income levels) and "Poverty relief" (which targets chronic poverty, not just the result of a disaster, and which does not necessarily have to be justified by a developmental impact).)

- Disaster relief
- Poverty relief
- Technical cooperation on global issues, including the environment
- U.S. bilateral interests
- Socioeconomic development

=== Disaster relief ===
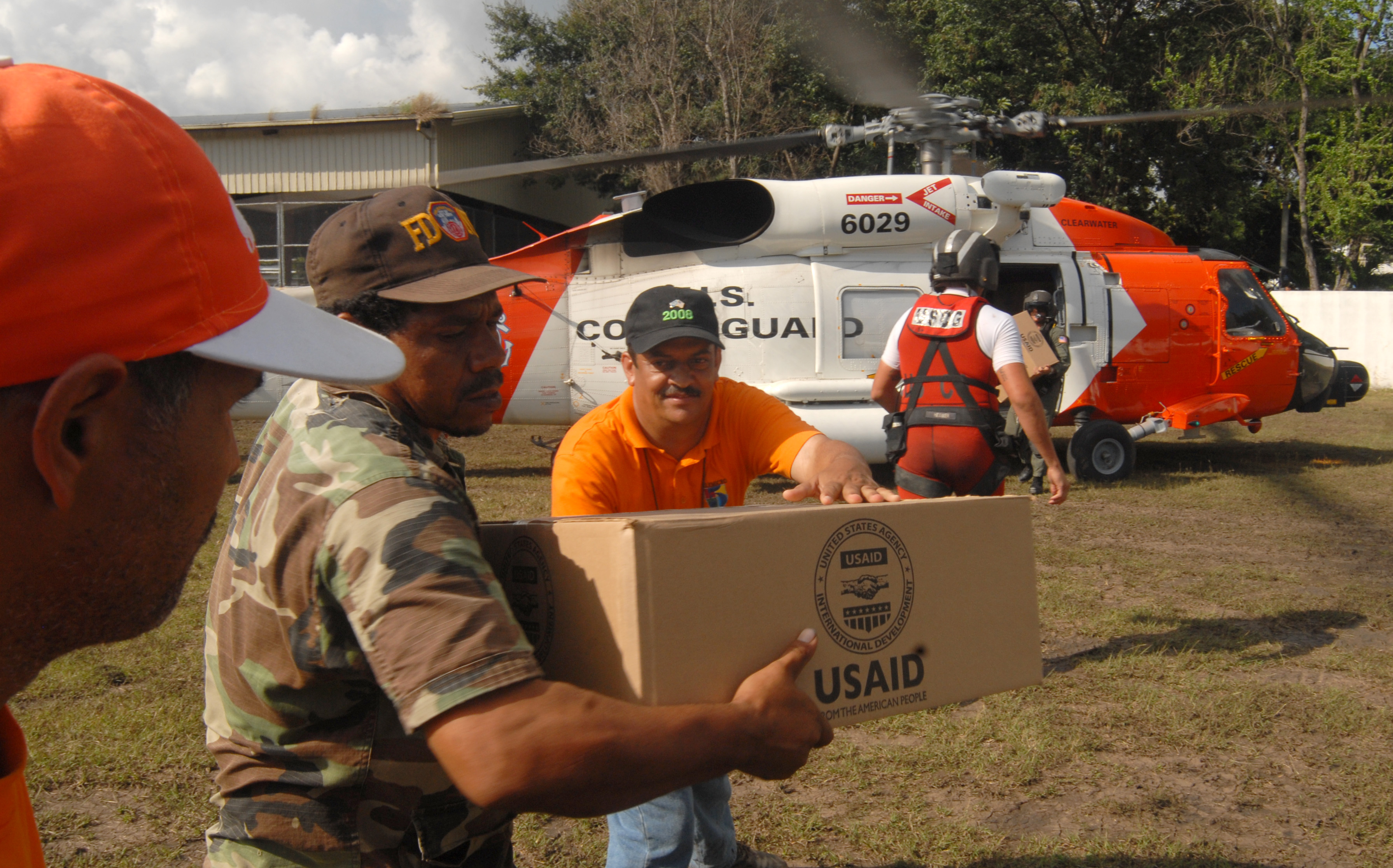
USAID packages are delivered by United States Coast Guard personnel.

Some of the U.S. government's earliest foreign aid programs provided relief in war-created crises. In 1915, U.S. government assistance through the Commission for Relief in Belgium headed by Herbert Hoover prevented starvation in Belgium after the German invasion. After 1945, the European Recovery Program championed by Secretary of State George Marshall (the "Marshall Plan") helped rebuild war-torn Western Europe.

=== Poverty relief ===
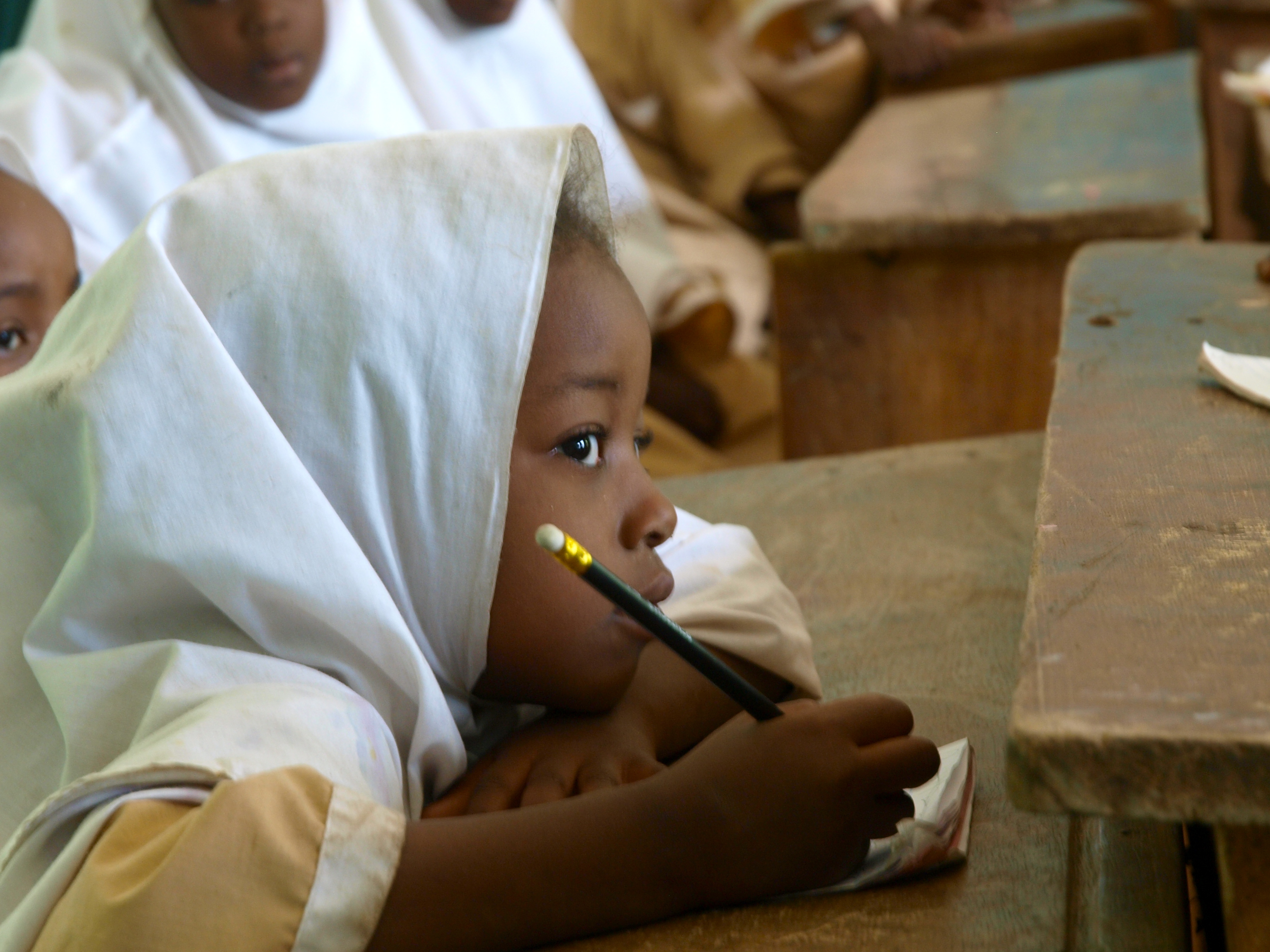
Early reading and literacy programs contribute to long-term development, USAID Nigeria.

After 1945, many newly independent countries needed assistance to relieve the chronic deprivation afflicting their low-income populations. USAID and its predecessor agencies have continuously provided poverty relief in many forms, including assistance to public health and education services targeted at the poorest. USAID has also helped manage food aid provided by the U.S. Department of Agriculture. Also, USAID provides funding to NGOs to supplement private donations in relieving chronic poverty.

=== Global issues ===
Technical cooperation between nations is essential for addressing a range of cross-border concerns like communicable diseases, environmental issues, trade and investment cooperation, safety standards for traded products, money laundering, and so forth. The United States has specialized federal agencies dealing with such areas, such as the Centers for Disease Control and the Environmental Protection Agency. USAID's special ability to administer programs in low-income countries supported these and other U.S. government agencies' international work on global concerns.

==== Environment ====
Among these global interests, environmental issues attracted high attention. USAID assisted projects that conserve and protect threatened land, water, forests, and wildlife. USAID also assists projects in reducing greenhouse gas emissions and building resilience to the risks associated with global climate change. U.S. environmental regulation laws require that programs sponsored by USAID should be both economically and environmentally sustainable.

=== U.S. national interests ===
Congress appropriates exceptional financial assistance to allies to support U.S. geopolitical interests, mainly in the form of "Economic Support Funds" (ESF). USAID is called on to administer the bulk (90%) of ESF and is instructed: "To the maximum extent feasible, [to] provide [ESF] assistance ... consistent with the policy directions, purposes, and programs of [development assistance]."

Also, when U.S. troops were in the field, USAID could supplement the "Civil Affairs" programs that the U.S. military conducts to win the friendship of local populations. In these circumstances, USAID may be directed by specially appointed diplomatic officials of the State Department, as has been done in Afghanistan and Pakistan during operations against al-Qaeda.

U.S. commercial interests were served by U.S. law's requirement that most goods and services financed by USAID must be sourced from U.S. vendors. American farms supplied about 41 percent of the food aid according to a 2021 report by the Congressional Research Service.

=== Socioeconomic development ===
To help low-income nations achieve self-sustaining socioeconomic development, USAID assisted them in improving the management of their own resources. USAID's assistance for socioeconomic development mainly provided technical advice, training, scholarships, commodities, and financial assistance. Through grants and contracts, USAID mobilized the technical resources of the private sector and other U.S. government agencies, universities, and NGOs to participate in this assistance.

Programs of the various types above frequently reinforced one another. For example, the Foreign Assistance Act required USAID to use funds appropriated for geopolitical purposes ("Economic Support Funds") to support socioeconomic development to the maximum extent possible.

== Organization ==
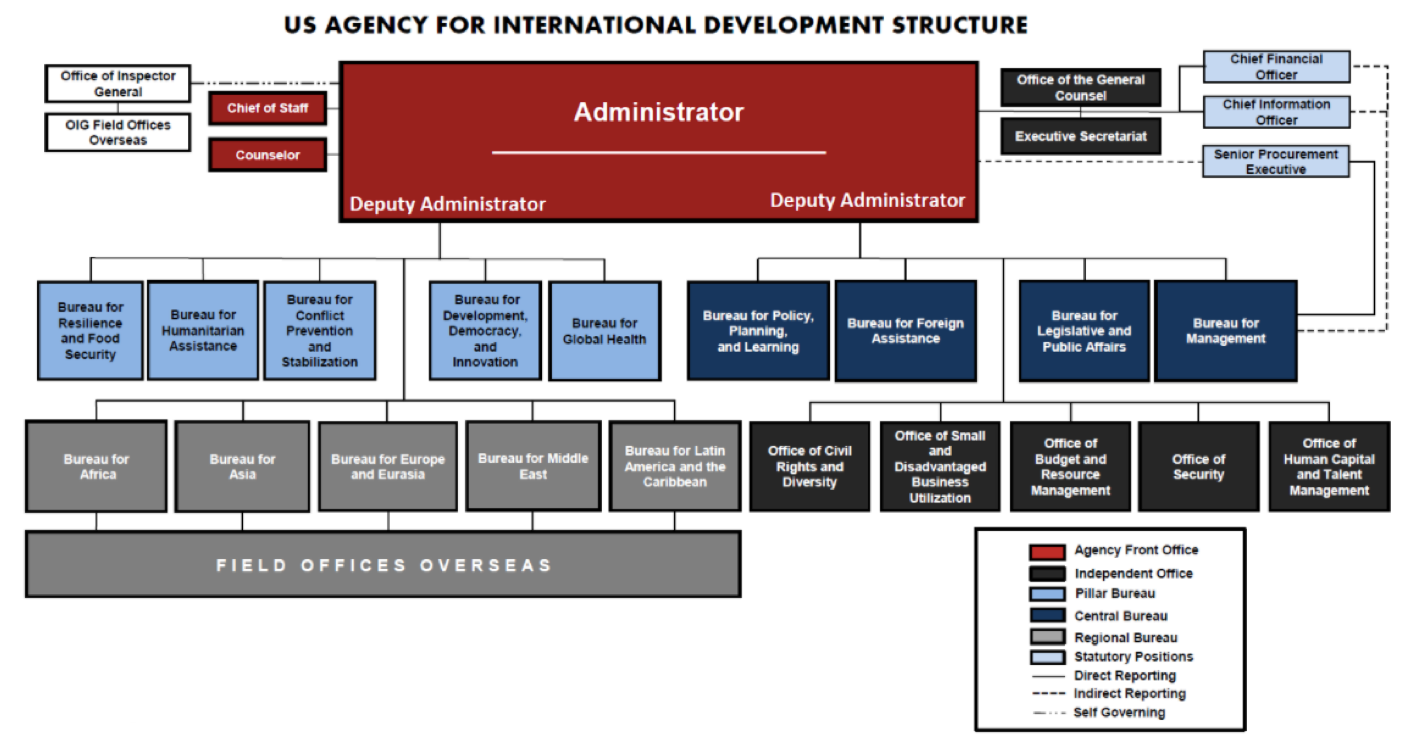
Organizational Chart showing the bureaus and offices of USAID

USAID is organized around country development programs managed by resident USAID offices in developing countries ("USAID missions"), supported by USAID's global headquarters in Washington, D.C.

=== Country development programs ===
USAID planned its work in each country around an individual country development program managed by a resident office called a "mission". The USAID mission and its U.S. staff were guests in the country, with a status that is usually defined by a "framework bilateral agreement" between the government of the United States and the host government. Framework bilaterals give the mission and its U.S. staff privileges similar to (but not necessarily the same as) those accorded to the U.S. embassy and diplomats by the Vienna Convention on Diplomatic Relations of 1961.

USAID missions work in over fifty countries, consulting with their governments and non-governmental organizations to identify programs that will receive USAID's assistance. As part of this process, USAID missions conduct socio-economic analysis, discuss projects with host-country leaders, design assistance to those projects, award contracts and grants, administer assistance (including evaluation and reporting), and manage flows of funds.

As countries develop and need less assistance, USAID shrunk and ultimately closed its resident missions. USAID had closed missions in a number of countries that had achieved a substantial level of prosperity, including South Korea, Turkey, and Costa Rica.

USAID also closed missions when requested by host countries for political reasons. In September 2012, the U.S. closed USAID/Russia at that country's request. Its mission in Moscow had been in operation for two decades. On May 1, 2013, the president of Bolivia, Evo Morales, asked USAID to close its mission, which had worked in the country for 49 years. The closure was completed on September 20, 2013.

USAID missions were led by mission directors and were staffed both by USAID Foreign Service officers and by development professionals from the country itself, with the host-country professionals forming the majority of the staff. The length of a Foreign Service officer's "tour" in most countries is four years, to provide enough time to develop in-depth knowledge about the country. (Shorter tours of one or two years were usual in countries of exceptional hardship or danger.)

The mission director was a member of the U.S. embassy's "country team" under the direction of the U.S. ambassador. As a USAID mission works in an unclassified environment with relative frequent public interaction, most missions were initially located in independent offices in the business districts of capital cities. Since the passage of the Foreign Affairs Agencies Consolidation Act in 1998 and the bombings of U.S. embassy chanceries in East Africa in the same year, missions have gradually been moved into U.S. embassy chancery compounds.

=== USAID/Washington ===
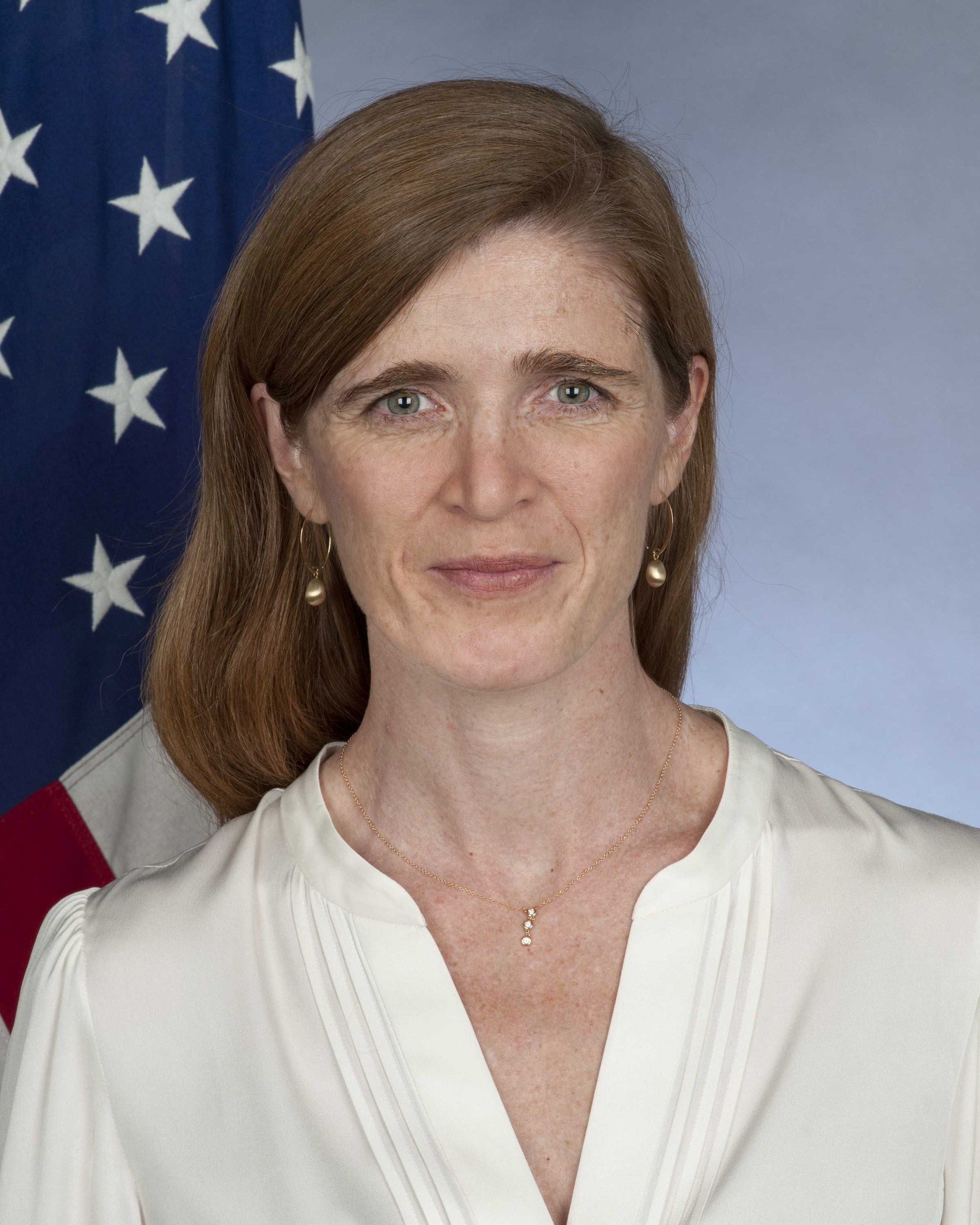
Samantha Power, USAID administrator under President Biden

The country programs were supported by USAID's headquarters in Washington, D.C., "USAID/Washington", where about half of USAID's Foreign Service officers work on rotation from foreign assignments, alongside USAID's Civil Service staff and top leadership.

USAID is headed by an administrator. Under the Biden administration, the administrator became a regular attendee of the National Security Council.

USAID/Washington helped define overall federal civilian foreign assistance policy and budgets, working with the State Department, Congress, and other U.S. government agencies. It was organized into "Bureaus" covering geographical areas, development subject areas, and administrative functions. Each bureau is headed by an assistant administrator appointed by the president.

(Some tasks similar to those of USAID's bureaus were performed by what were termed "independent offices".)

- Geographic bureaus
  - AFR – Africa
  - ASIA – Asia
  - LAC – Latin America & the Caribbean
  - E&E – Europe and Eurasia
  - ME – the Middle East
- Subject-area bureaus
  - GH – Global Health
    - Every year, the Global Health Bureau reported to the U.S. Congress through its Global Health Report to Congress. The Global Health Bureau also submits a yearly report on the Call to Action: ending preventable child and maternal deaths. This is part of USAID's follow-up to the 2012, where it committed to ending preventable child and maternal deaths in a generation with A Promise Renewed.
  - E3 – Economic Growth, Education, and the Environment
    - Economic Growth offices in E3 defined Agency policy and provide technical support to Mission assistance activities in the areas of economic policy formulation, international trade, sectoral regulation, capital markets, microfinance, energy, infrastructure, land tenure, urban planning and property rights, gender equality and women's empowerment. The Engineering Division, in particular, draws on licensed professional engineers to support USAID Missions in a multibillion-dollar portfolio of construction projects, including medical facilities, schools, universities, roads, power plants, and water and sanitation plants.
    - The Education Office in E3 defines Agency policy and provides technical support to Mission assistance activities for both basic and tertiary education.
    - Environment offices in E3 define Agency policy and provide technical support to Mission assistance activities in the areas of climate change and biodiversity.
  - Bureau for Humanitarian Assistance
  - Bureau for Democracy, Human Rights and Governance
    - The mission of the DRG Bureau was to lead USAID's efforts to invigorate democracy, enhance human rights and justice, and bolster governance that advances the public interest and delivers inclusive development.
  - LAB – U.S. Global Development Lab
    - The Lab serves as an innovation hub, taking smart risks to test new ideas and partner within the Agency and with other actors to harness the power of innovative tools and approaches that accelerate development impact.
  - RFS – Resilience and Food Security
- Headquarters bureaus
  - M – Management
  - OHCTM – Office of Human Capital and Talent Management
  - LPA – Legislative and Public Affairs
  - PPL – Policy, Planning, and Learning
  - BRM – Office of Budget and Resource Management

Independent oversight of USAID activities was provided by its Office of Inspector General, U.S. Agency for International Development, which conducted criminal and civil investigations, financial and performance audits, reviews, and inspections of USAID activities around the world.

=== Staffing ===
In a November 2025 response to interrogatories, the U.S. Department of State said USAID had approximately 74 direct-hire employees, in addition to other appointees and contract support staff.

USAID's staffing reported to Congress in June 2016 totaled 10,235, including both field missions "overseas" (7,176) and the Washington, D.C., headquarters (3,059). Of this total, 1,850 were USAID Foreign Service officers who spend their careers mostly residing overseas (1,586 overseas in June 2016) and partly on rotation in Washington, D.C. (264). The Foreign Service officers stationed overseas worked alongside the 4,935 local staff of USAID's field missions.

Host-country staff normally worked under one-year contracts that were renewed annually. Formerly, host-country staff could be recruited as "direct hires" in career positions and at present many host-country staff continue working with USAID missions for full careers on a series of one-year contracts. In USAID's management approach, local staff may fill highly responsible, professional roles in program design and management.

U.S. citizens can apply to become USAID Foreign Service officers by competing for specific job openings based on academic qualifications and experience in development programs. Within five years of recruitment, most Foreign Service officers receive tenure for an additional 20+ years of employment before mandatory retirement. Some were promoted to the Senior Foreign Service with extended tenure, subject to the Foreign Service's mandatory retirement age of 65. (This recruitment system differs from the State Department's use of the "Foreign Service Officer Test" to identify potential U.S. diplomats. Individuals who pass the test become candidates for the State Department's selection process, which emphasizes personal qualities in thirteen dimensions such as "Composure" and "Resourcefulness". No specific education level is required.)

In 2008, USAID launched the "Development Leadership Initiative" to reverse the decline in USAID's Foreign Service officer staffing, which had fallen to a total of about 1,200 worldwide. Although USAID's goal was to double the number of Foreign Service officers to about 2,400 in 2012, actual recruitment net of attrition reached only 820 by the end of 2012. USAID's 2016 total of 1,850 Foreign Service officers compared with 13,000 in the State Department.

== Field missions ==
Pakistani and U.S. staff of USAID/Pakistan in 2009

While USAID can have as little presence in a country as a single person assigned to the U.S. embassy, a full USAID mission in a larger country may have twenty or more USAID Foreign Service officers and a hundred or more professional and administrative employees from the country itself.

The USAID mission's staff is divided into specialized offices in three groups: (1) assistance management offices; (2) the mission director's and the program office; and (3) the contracting, financial management, and facilities offices.

=== Assistance management offices ===
Called "technical" offices by USAID staff, these offices designed and managed the technical and financial assistance that USAID provides to their local counterparts' projects. The technical offices that were frequently found in USAID missions include Health and Family Planning, Education, Environment, Democracy, and Economic Growth.

==== Health and Family Planning ====
Examples of projects assisted by missions' Health and Family Planning offices were projects for the eradication of communicable diseases, strengthening of public health systems focusing on maternal-child health including family planning services, HIV-AIDS monitoring, delivery of medical supplies including contraceptives, and coordination of Demographic and Health Surveys. This assistance is primarily targeted to the poor majority of the population and corresponds to USAID's poverty relief objective, as well as strengthening the basis for socio-economic development.

==== Education ====
USAID's Education offices mainly assisted the national school system, emphasizing broadening the coverage of quality basic education to reach the entire population. Examples of projects often assisted by Education offices were projects for curriculum development, teacher training, and provision of improved textbooks and materials. Larger programs have included school construction. Education offices often manage scholarship programs for training in the U.S., while assistance to the country's universities and professional education institutions may be provided by Economic Growth and Health offices. The Education office's emphasis on school access for the poor majority of the population corresponds to USAID's poverty relief objective, as well as to the socioeconomic development objective in the long term.

==== Environment ====
Examples of projects assisted by environmental offices were projects for tropical forest conservation, protection of indigenous people's lands, regulation of marine fishing industries, pollution control, reduction of greenhouse gas emissions, and helping communities adapt to climate change. Environment assistance corresponds to USAID's objective of technical cooperation on global issues, as well as laying a sustainable basis for USAID's socioeconomic development objective in the long term.

==== Democracy ====
Examples of projects assisted by Democracy offices were projects for the country's political institutions, including elections, political parties, legislatures, and human rights organizations. Counterparts include the judicial sector and civil society organizations that monitor government performance. Democracy assistance received its greatest impetus at the time of the creation of the successor states to the USSR starting in about 1990, corresponding both to USAID's objective of supporting U.S. bilateral interests and to USAID's socioeconomic development objective.

==== Economic Growth ====
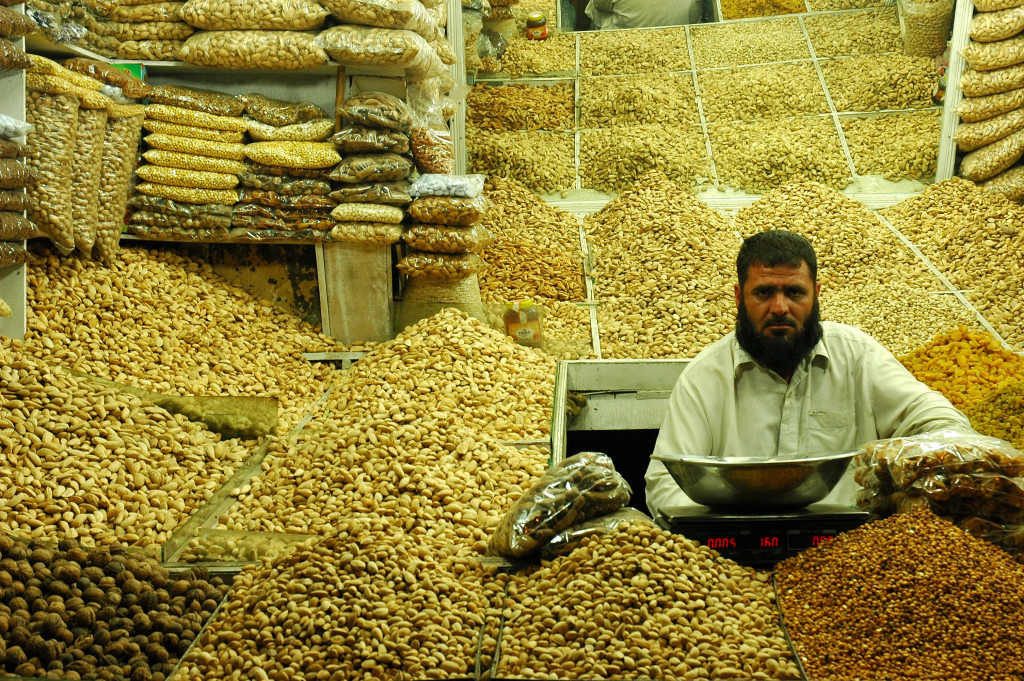
A dried fruit vendor in Peshawar, Pakistan (2007)

Examples of projects often assisted by Economic Growth offices were projects for improvements in agricultural techniques and marketing (the mission may have had a specialized "Agriculture" office), development of microfinance industries, streamlining of Customs administrations (to accelerate the growth of exporting industries), and modernization of government regulatory frameworks for the industry in various sectors (telecommunications, agriculture, and so forth). In USAID's early years and some larger programs, Economic Growth offices have financed economic infrastructure like roads and electrical power plants. Economic Growth assistance was thus quite diverse in terms of the range of sectors where it may work. It corresponded to USAID's socioeconomic development objective and is the source of sustainable poverty reduction. Economic Growth offices also occasionally manage assistance to poverty relief projects, such as to government programs that provide "cash transfer" payments to low-income families.

==== Special assistance ====
Some USAID missions had specialized technical offices for areas like counter-narcotics assistance or assistance in conflict zones.

Disaster assistance on a large scale is provided through USAID's Office of U.S. Foreign Disaster Assistance. Rather than having a permanent presence in country missions, this office has supplies pre-positioned in strategic locations to respond quickly to disasters when and where they occur.

=== The Office of the Mission Director and the Program Office ===
The mission director's signature authorized technical offices to assist according to the designs and budgets they propose. With the help of the Program Office, the mission director ensures that designs were consistent with USAID policy for the country, including budgetary earmarks by which Washington directs that funds be used for certain general purposes such as public health or environmental conservation. The Program Office compiles combined reports to Washington to support budget requests to Congress and to verify that budgets were used as planned.

=== Contracting, financial management and management offices ===
While the mission director was the public face and key decision-maker for an array of USAID technical capabilities, the offices that made USAID preeminent among U.S. government agencies in the ability to follow through on assistance agreements in low-income countries were the "support" offices.

==== Contracting ====
Commitments of U.S. government funds to NGOs and firms that implemented USAID's assistance programs can only be made in compliance with carefully designed contracts and grant agreements executed by warranted Contracting and agreement officers. The mission director is authorized to commit financial assistance directly to the country's government agencies.

==== Financial management ====
Funds can be committed only when the Mission's Controller certifies their availability for the stated purpose. "FM" offices assisted technical offices in financial analysis and in developing detailed budgets for inputs needed by projects assisted. They evaluate potential recipients' management abilities before financial assistance can be authorized and then review implementers' expenditure reports with great care. This office often had the largest number of staff of any office in the mission.

==== Management ====
Called the "Executive Office" in USAID (sometimes leading to confusion with the Embassy's Executive Office, which is the office of the ambassador), "EXO" provided operational support for mission offices, including human resources, information systems management, transportation, property, and procurement services. Increasing integration into embassies' chancery complexes, and the State Department's recently increased role in providing support services to USAID, is expanding the importance of coordination between USAID's EXO and the embassy's Management section.

== Budget ==
USAID-managed foreign assistance disbursed
by fiscal year ($ billions, inflation adjusted to 2023)

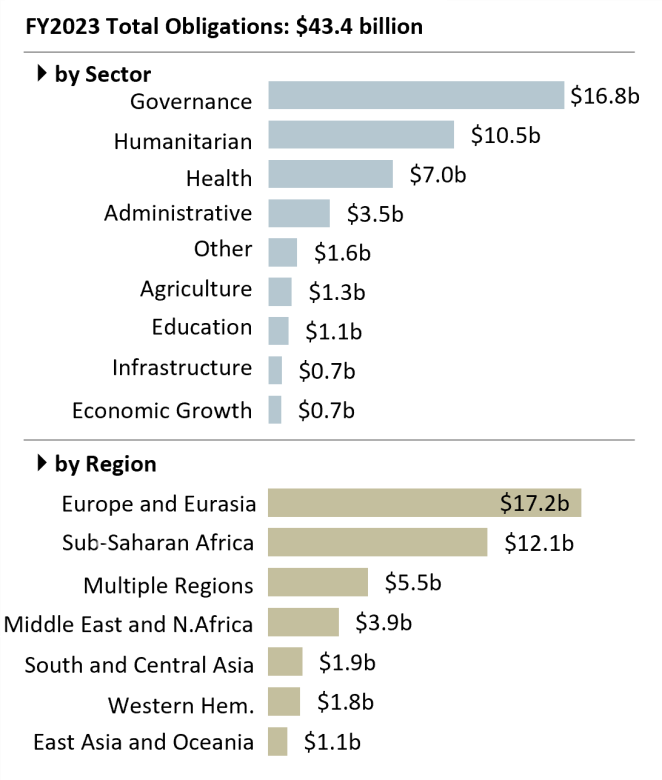
USAID-managed funding obligations estimate for 2023 from the Congressional Research Service. Congress had enacted large sums for Ukraine this year, leading to higher than normal Governance and European funding.

Countries with 1% or over of USAID managed foreign assistance disbursed in Fiscal Year 2023
Country	US$ billion	Share of total
Ukraine	16.02	36.6%
Global funds	6.06	13.8%
Ethiopia	1.68	3.8%
Jordan	1.20	2.7%
Afghanistan	1.09	2.5%
Somalia	1.05	2.4%
DR Congo	0.94	2.1%
Syria	0.89	2.0%
Nigeria	0.82	1.9%
Yemen	0.81	1.9%
South Sudan	0.74	1.7%
Kenya	0.68	1.6%
Uganda	0.52	1.2%
Mozambique	0.47	1.1%
Sudan	0.46	1.1%
Tanzania	0.45	1.0%

The Congressional Research Service (CRS) states that some USAID appropriations were programmed collaboratively with the Department of State, which makes any calculation of the USAID budget imprecise, and the CRS generally refers to USAID-managed funds. The CRS stated USAID managed more than $40 billion of combined appropriations in 2023, and had a workforce of more than 10,000. The mean average managed foreign assistance disbursed in the fiscal years 2001 to 2024 was $22.9 billion in inflation adjusted to 2023 dollars; 2023 was an exceptional year because of an extra $16 billion of funds for Ukraine.

The U.S. government USAspending.gov website included International Security Assistance, Special Assistance Initiatives and a small amount of other spending alongside direct USAID spending in its assessment of the 2023 $50.1 billion of budgetary resources available to USAID, about $10 billion more than the headline CRS assessment. International Security Assistance was budgeted about $9 billion in 2023, of which Foreign Military Financing to strengthen military support of key U.S. allies and partner governments was $6 billion.

In fiscal year 2022, the cost of supplying USAID's assistance includes the agency's "Operating Expenses" of $1.97 billion, and "Bilateral Economic Assistance" program costs of $25.01 billion (the vast bulk of which was administered by USAID). In fiscal year 2012, "Operating Expenses" were $1.53 billion, and "Bilateral Economic Assistance" was $20.83 billion.

U.S. assistance budget totals were shown along with other countries' total assistance budgets in tables in a webpage of the Organization for Economic Cooperation and Development.

At the Earth Summit in Rio de Janeiro in 1992, most of the world's governments adopted a program for action under the auspices of the United Nations Agenda 21, which included an Official Development Assistance (ODA) aid target of 0.7% of gross national product (GNP) for rich nations, specified as roughly 22 members of the OECD and known as the Development Assistance Committee (DAC). Most countries do not adhere to this target, as the OECD's table indicates that the DAC average ODA in 2011 was 0.31% of GNP. The U.S. figure for 2011 was 0.20% of GNP, which still left the U.S. as the largest single source of ODA among individual countries. According to the OECD, The United States' total official development assistance (ODA) (US$55.3 billion, preliminary data) increased in 2022, mainly due to support to Ukraine, as well as increased costs for in-donor refugees from Afghanistan. ODA represented 0.22% of gross national income (GNI).

== Modes of assistance ==
USAID delivered both technical and financial assistance:

=== Technical assistance ===
Technical assistance included technical advice, training, scholarships, construction, and commodities. USAID contracts or procures technical assistance and provides it in-kind to recipients. For technical advisory services, USAID draws on experts from the private sector, mainly from the assisted country's pool of expertise and from specialized U.S. government agencies. Many host-government leaders have drawn on USAID's technical assistance to develop IT systems and procure computer hardware to strengthen their institutions.

To build indigenous expertise and leadership, USAID financed scholarships to U.S. universities and assists in the strengthening of developing countries' universities. Local universities' programs in developmentally important sectors were assisted directly and through USAID support for forming partnerships with U.S. universities.

The various forms of technical assistance were frequently coordinated as capacity-building packages for the development of local institutions.

=== Financial assistance ===
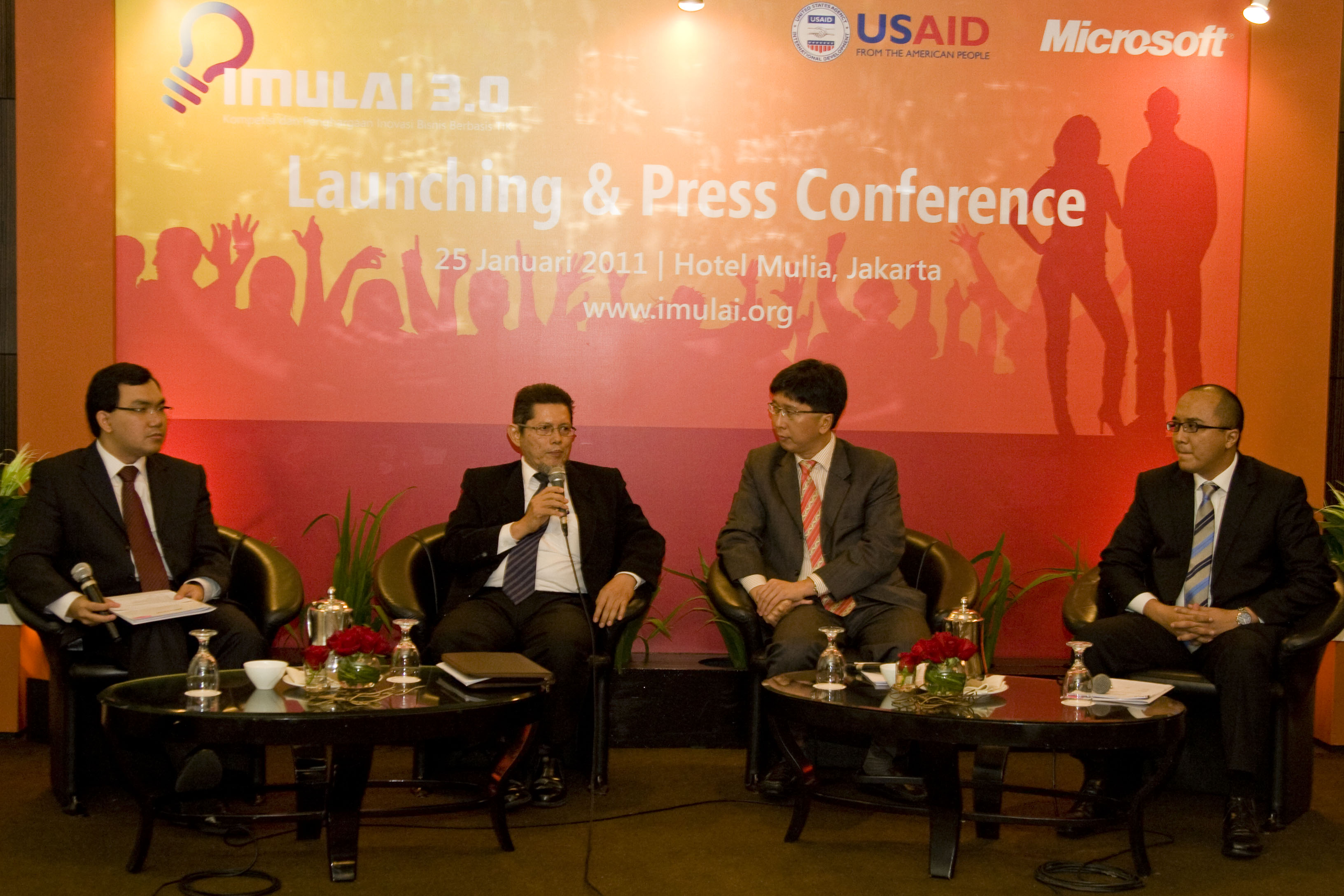
National Open Source Software Competition – USAID financial assistance for groups developing technology in Indonesia

Financial assistance supplied cash to developing country organizations to supplement their budgets. USAID also provided financial assistance to local and international NGOs who in turn give technical assistance in developing countries. Although USAID formerly provided loans, all financial assistance is now provided in the form of non-reimbursable grants.

In recent years, the United States had increased its emphasis on financial rather than technical assistance. In 2004, the Bush administration created the Millennium Challenge Corporation as a new foreign aid agency that is mainly restricted to providing financial assistance. In 2009, the Obama administration initiated a major realignment of USAID's own programs to emphasize financial assistance, referring to it as "government-to-government" or "G2G" assistance.

=== Public–private partnerships ===
In April 2023, USAID and the Global Food Safety Initiative (GFSI) announced a memorandum of understanding (MOU) to improve food safety and sustainable food systems in Africa. GFSI's work in benchmarking and standard harmonization aims to foster mutual acceptance of GFSI-recognized certification programs for the food industry.

== Activities by region ==
=== Haiti ===
Following the January 2010 earthquake in Haiti, USAID helped provide safer housing for almost 200,000 displaced Haitians; supported vaccinations for more than 1 million people; cleared more than 1.3 million cubic meters of the approximately 10 million cubic meters of rubble generated; helped more than 10,000 farmers double the yields of staples like corn, beans, and sorghum; and provided short-term employment to more than 350,000 Haitians, injecting more than $19 million into the local economy. USAID has provided nearly $42 million to help combat cholera, helping to decrease the number of cases requiring hospitalization and reduce the case fatality rate.

=== Afghanistan ===
With American entry into Afghanistan in 2001, USAID worked with the Department of State and Department of Defense to coordinate reconstruction efforts.

=== Iraq ===
The interactions between USAID and other U.S. government agencies in the period of planning the Iraq operation of 2003 are described by the Office of the Special Inspector General for Iraq Reconstruction in its book Hard Lessons: The Iraq Reconstruction Experience.

Subsequently, USAID played a major role in the U.S. reconstruction and development effort in Iraq. As of June 2009, USAID had invested approximately $6.6 billion on programs designed to stabilize communities; foster economic and agricultural growth; and build the capacity of the national, local, and provincial governments to represent and respond to the needs of the Iraqi people.

In June 2003, C-SPAN followed USAID administrator Andrew Natsios as he toured Iraq. The special program C-SPAN produced aired over four nights.

=== Lebanon ===
USAID has periodically supported the Lebanese American University and the American University of Beirut financially, with major contributions to the Lebanese American University's Campaign for Excellence.

=== Europe ===
==== Ukraine ====
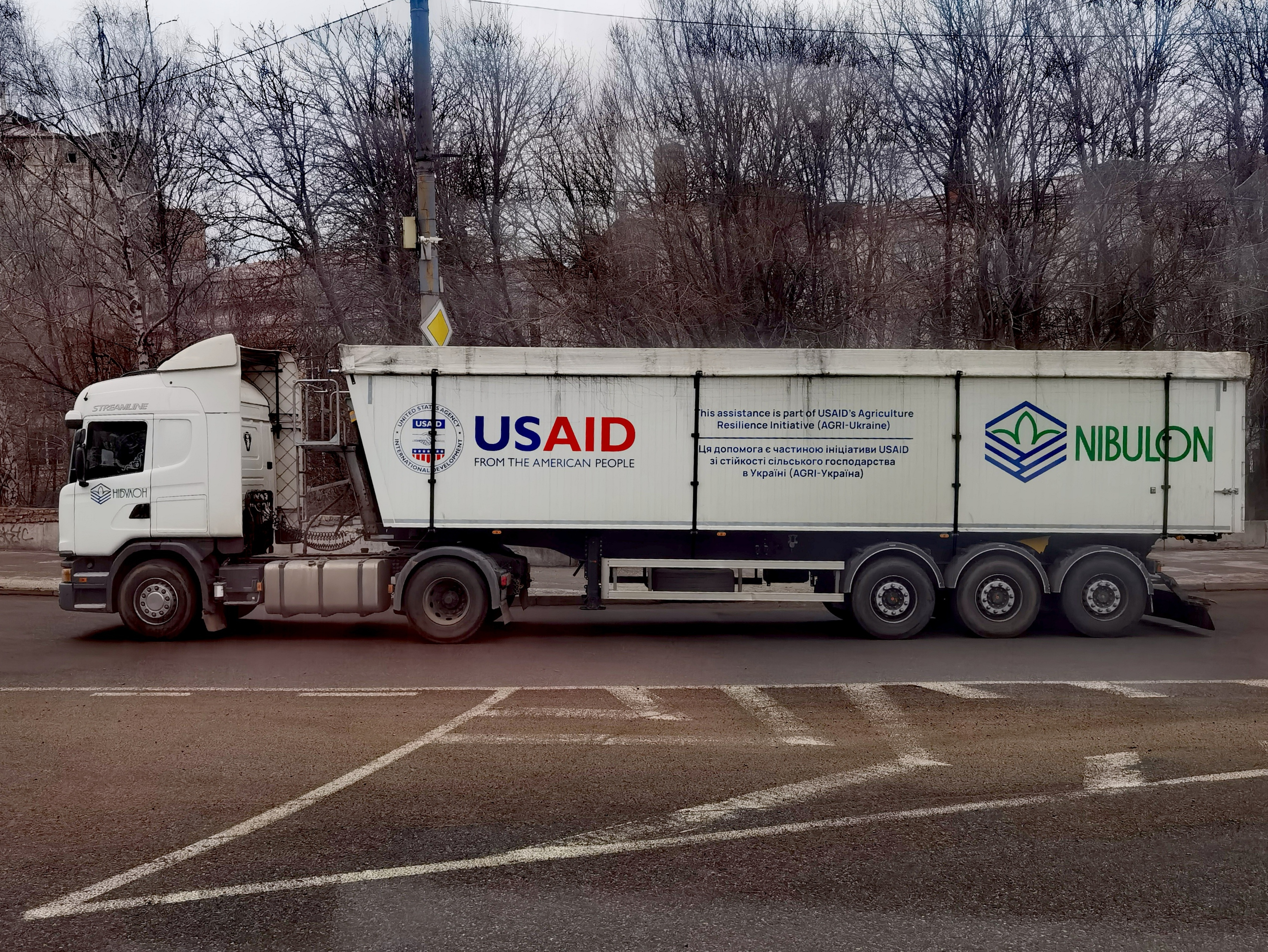
Truck acquired by USAID program in Dnipro, Ukraine.

In the twenty years prior to the 2022 Russian invasion of Ukraine USAID dispersed modest funds, averaging $115 million, in Ukraine. Following the invasion, Congress enacted large sums for Ukraine through USAID to support the operation of its government and civil society. In fiscal year 2022 nearly $9 billion was disbursed, and $16 billion in 2023 causing that year to be the highest total spending year for USAID with 36.6% of its managed funds being disbursed to Ukraine.

==== United Kingdom ====
USAID has donated funds to international charity BBC Media Action, with approximately $3.23 million (£2.6 million) given in 2024. This funding supports media development, journalism training, and public education initiatives in over 30 countries.

=== Cuba ===
USAID funded programs in Cuba intended to expand access to information and support civil-society activity. In 2009, Cuban authorities arrested Alan Gross, a subcontractor working on a USAID-funded program, after he distributed satellite and computer equipment intended to provide internet access. Gross was sentenced to 15 years in prison and released in December 2014 during a broader normalization of relations between Cuba and the United States.

From 2010 to 2012, USAID financed ZunZuneo, a text-messaging social network for Cuban users. An Associated Press investigation found that contractors initially used nonpolitical content to attract subscribers and planned to introduce political material intended to encourage collective action. The U.S. government's involvement was concealed from users, and the service attracted tens of thousands of subscribers before its funding ended. USAID administrator Rajiv Shah later told Congress that the project was intended to promote open communication rather than overthrow the Cuban government and denied that it had been a covert operation. Critics argued that the program's secrecy endangered aid workers and risked creating the impression that USAID conducted intelligence activities.

In a separate program beginning in 2009, USAID contractors sent young Latin Americans to Cuba posing as tourists or aid workers to identify potential political activists. One activity used an HIV prevention workshop as cover for broader political organizing. The program was criticized for placing inexperienced participants at risk and for potentially undermining international health work; USAID said that the activities supported Cuban civil society and were consistent with its democracy programs.

=== Bolivia ===
USAID operated in the coca-growing Chapare region, including under a 1983 agreement to support crop-substitution programs to encourage other crops. No later than 1998, this funding was conditional on farmers eradicating all their coca plants. In 2008, the coca growers union affiliated with Bolivian president Evo Morales ejected the 100 employees and contractors from USAID working in the Chapare region, citing frustration with U.S. efforts to persuade them to switch to growing unviable alternatives. Other rules, such as the requirement that participating communities declare themselves "terrorist-free zones" as required by U.S. law irritated people, said Kathryn Ledebur, director of the Andean Information Network. "Eradicate all your coca and then you grow an orange tree that will get fruit in eight years but you don't have anything to eat in the meantime? A bad idea. The thing about kicking out USAID, I don't think it's an anti-American sentiment overall but rather a rejection of bad programs."

Also in 2008, USAID's Bolivian programs under the Office of Transitional Initiatives and the Democracy Program, as well as separate funding by the National Endowment for Democracy, were the subject of critical investigative reports that documented them supporting political initiatives in regions governed by separatist movements. During the September 2008 political crisis, President Evo Morales expelled US ambassador Philip S. Goldberg and spoke out against USAID interference. The US government had previously ended OTI spending in Bolivia and subsequently redirected Democracy Program funds to other purposes, while denying USAID had interfered in Bolivian politics.

President Evo Morales expelled USAID from Bolivia on May 1, 2013, for allegedly seeking to undermine his government following ten years of operations within the country. At the time, the USAID had seven American staffers and 37 Bolivian staffers in the country, with an annual budget of $26.7 million. President Morales explained that the expulsion was because USAID's objectives in Bolivia were to advance American interests, not to advance the interests of the Bolivian people. More specifically, President Morales noted the American "counter-narcotic" programs that harms the interests of Bolivian coca farmers who get caught in the middle of American operations.

Following the 2019 Bolivian political crisis that saw Jeanine Áñez's assumption of power, President Áñez invited USAID to return to Bolivia to provide "technical aid to the electoral process in Bolivia". In October 2020, USAID provided $700,000 in emergency assistance in fighting wildfires to the government of Luis Arce.

=== Brazil ===
During the Brazilian military dictatorship, the organization launched MEC-USAID Agreements, responsible for transforming the Brazilian education policies closer to the USA. USAID also acted in the countries public security. Between 1960 and 1972, USAID trained cops that were involved in political repression in Brazil.

Folha de S.Paulo, Brazil's largest newspaper, accused USAID of trying to influence political reform in Brazil in a way that would have purposely benefited right-wing parties. USAID spent $95,000 US in 2005 on a seminar in the Brazilian Congress to promote a reform aimed at pushing for legislation punishing party infidelity. According to USAID papers acquired by Folha under the Freedom of Information Act, the seminar was planned to coincide with the eve of talks in that country's Congress on a broad political reform. The papers read that although the "pattern of weak party discipline is found across the political spectrum, it is somewhat less true of parties on the liberal left, such as the [ruling] Worker's Party." The papers also expressed a concern about the "'indigenization' of the conference so that it is not viewed as providing a U.S. perspective." The event's main sponsor was the International Republican Institute.

In February 2025, Michael Benz, a former state department official, affirmed in an interview with Steve Bannon on The War Room that Bolsonaro was seen in USAID as "Tropical Trump" and "if USAID didn't exist, Bolsonaro would still be the president of Brazil". In February 3, Eduardo Bolsonaro, federal deputy and son of Jair Bolsonaro, answered Benz in his social media by, accusing USAID of financing institutions involved with fighting against fake news during the presidential elections in 2022, such as the International Center for Journalists, Sleeping Giants Brazil and Vero Institute, created by the YouTuber Felipe Neto, with the objective of "manipulating narratives and interfering with Brazilian democracy". He and Gustavo Gayer also began to collect signatures to open a Parliamentary Inquiry Commission to investigate the supposed interference. His accusations are largely considered as fake news and many of the accused institutions affirmed that they never received money from USAID. Shortly after, in a speech for the Ação Política Conservadora, President of Argentina Javier Milei alleged without evidence that USAID used millions of dollars to falsify the 2022 election.

=== East Africa ===
On September 19, 2011, USAID and the Ad Council launched the "Famine, War, and Drought" (FWD) campaign to raise awareness about that year's severe drought in East Africa. Through TV and internet ads as well as social media initiatives, FWD encouraged Americans to spread awareness about the crisis, support the humanitarian organizations that were conducting relief operations, and consult the Feed the Future global initiative for broader solutions. Celebrities Geena Davis, Uma Thurman, Josh Hartnett and Chanel Iman took part in the campaign via a series of public service announcements. Corporations like Cargill, General Mills, and PepsiCo also signed on to support FWD.

After the Trump administration's termination of most of USAID's programs in early 2025, during an Ebola outbreak in Uganda, USAID-funded research efforts into Ebola treatment and prevention were halted in Uganda. During the previous Ebola outbreak in Uganda in 2022, USAID had funded contact tracing efforts, the supply of protective equipment, safe burials, etc.

=== Palestinian territories ===
USAID halted its assistance to the West Bank and Gaza Strip on January 31, 2019, reportedly at the request of the Palestinian Authority. The request was related to new U.S. legislation, the Anti-Terrorism Clarification Act of 2018, that exposed foreign aid recipients to anti-terrorism lawsuits. USAID restarted assistance to Palestinians in April 2021 under President Biden. The agency increased assistance during the Israel–Gaza war that began in October 2023. Since October 7, 2023, USAID gave more than $2.1 billion in assistance to Palestinians. On November 10, 2023, more than 1,000 USAID employees signed an open letter calling for an immediate ceasefire in the war.

=== Vietnam ===
USAID, alongside the Department of State and Defense, has supported NGOs to removing unexploded ordnance (UXO) and landmines, and remediating soil contaminated by Agent Orange from multiple regions in Vietnam, as well as supporting victims of Agent Orange.

== Personnel who died in the course of their work ==
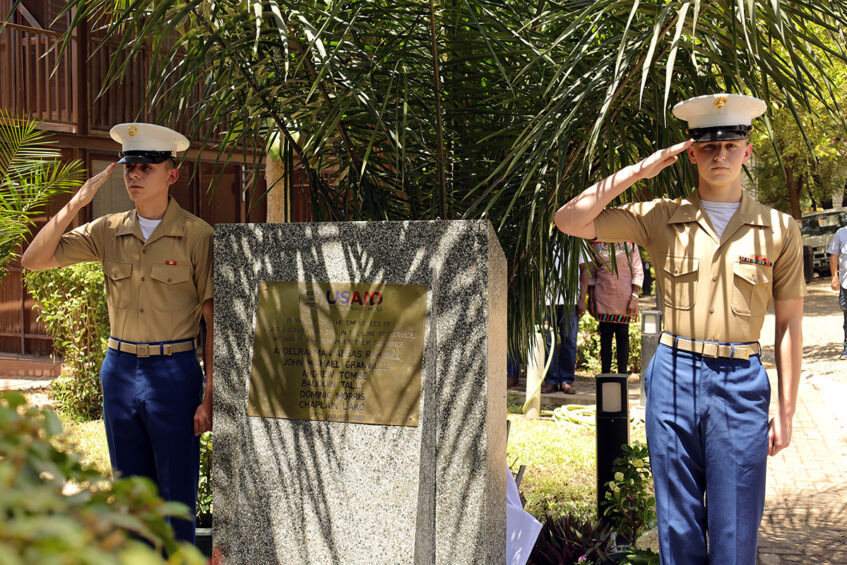
Two Marines salute a memorial to USAID officers killed in Sudan. Several executed by a military tribunal, two killed in a drive-by-shooting, one killed in a traffic collision.

Over 100 personnel and contractors of the United States Agency for International Development (USAID) are listed as having died while serving abroad, with the majority of incidents occurring during the Vietnam War - where over 50 USAID personnel died in Laos, Thailand, and Vietnam. Causes of death include assassinations, bombings, ambushes, accidents, and suicides.

The roles of those killed vary widely — public safety advisors working under the Office of Public Safety (OPS), agricultural experts, and health officers among them. The OPS has been quantitatively classified as the most dangerous occupation within USAID: the task of a "Public Safety Advisor" was to train police forces around the world, because at the time, security was considered part of the trivariate of D's: "Diplomacy, Development, and Defense." The majority of these public safety officers were former high-ranking police officers in the United States. The Office of Public Safety was shuttered in 1973 after much controversy.Several USAID personnel died in POW and concentration camps, such as Gustav Crane Hertz, and Thomas W. Ragsdale. Joseph W. Grainger was kept in a cave for five months, managed to escape, was captured a week later and was summarily executed. Two pilots for Air America, John L. Oyer and Justin B. Mahoney, are listed as having been contracted by USAID while transporting a passenger whose name is still redacted by the CIA. However, Jack J. Wells, a public safety advisor, was also noted as having been on board the aircraft being piloted by Oyer and Mahoney when it was shot down. Air America was often used to transport building materials, food, medical aid and equipment, and many other supplies needed for development operations in Southeast Asia. Many pilots and aircraft owned by Air America were permanently assigned to USAID. Air America was also used for refugee resettlements, especially the evacuation of Hmong people from dangerous areas.

== US public opinion ==
According to a 2010 poll, the median American believed that 25% of the federal budget goes to foreign aid and that it should be 10%. In reality, between 0.8% and 1.4% of the U.S. federal budget has gone to foreign aid since 2001. The USAID portion of the federal budget is even smaller, accounting for 0.6% in 2023.

In a 2019 poll of the American public, 35% said more money should be spent on foreign aid, 33% said spending should stay about the same, and 28% said less money should be spent.

A 2025 poll revealed that 50% of Americans believed that the US should play a major or leading role in improving health in developing countries, with 36% preferring a minor role and 14% preferring no role at all. However, the same poll also revealed that 43% of Americans thought that "too much" US funding was being given to these initiatives.

A February 2025 poll by the University of Maryland's Program for Public Consultation found that, after presented with arguments for and against closure, 58% of Americans supported continuing USAID compared to 41% supporting abolition. Another poll by Ipsos found that just 37% supported Trump's efforts to dismantle the agency while 58% opposed the efforts.

== Concerns and criticism ==
U.S. foreign economic assistance has been the subject of debate and criticism since at least the 1950s.

=== Claims of wasteful spending ===
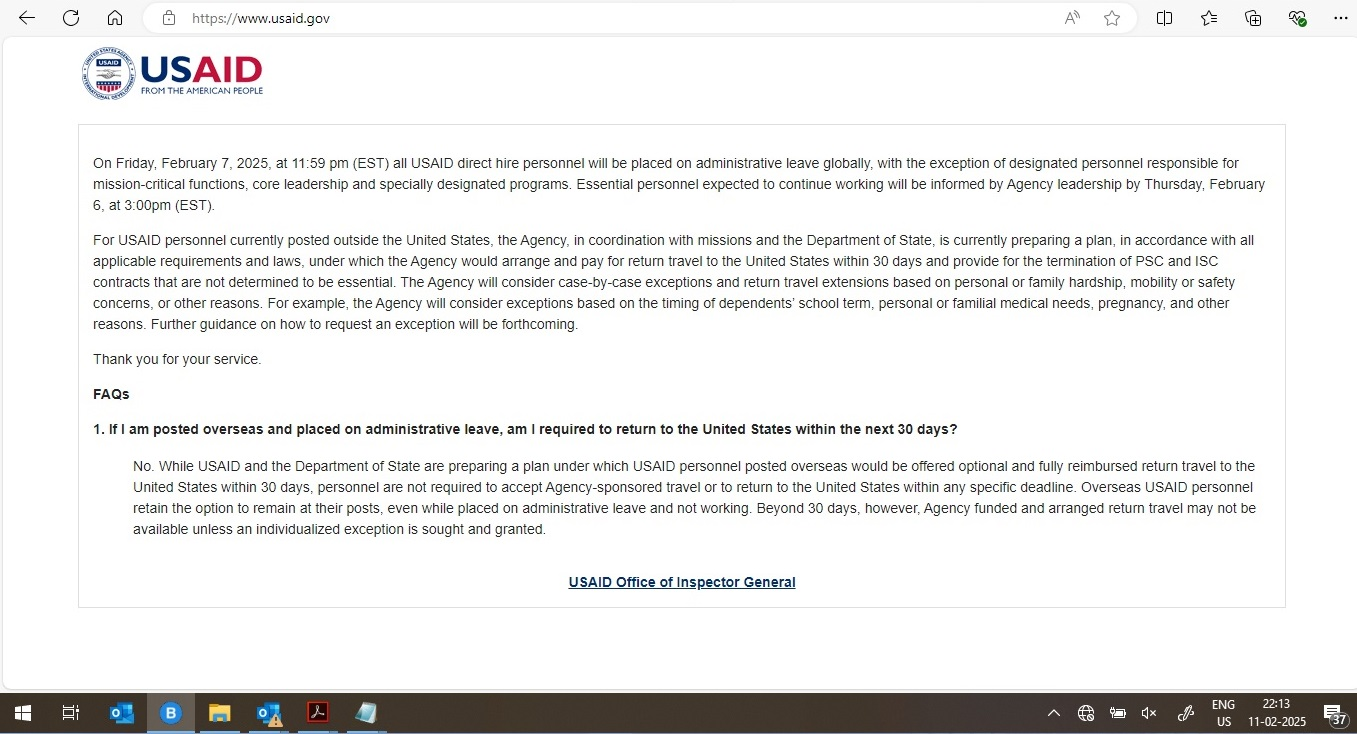
Screenshot of USAID's webpage, 3 Feb. 2025

In 2025, the Trump administration accused USAID of "wasting massive sums of taxpayer money" over several decades, including during Trump's first presidency from 2017 to 2021. The administration cited a number of projects, including $1.5 million for LGBT workplace inclusion in Serbia, $2.5 million to build electric vehicle chargers in Vietnam, $6 million for tourism promotion in Egypt, and "hundreds of millions of dollars" (the largest item) purportedly allocated to discourage Afghanistan farmers from growing poppies for opium, which allegedly ended up supporting poppy cultivation and benefiting the Taliban. Fact checkers found that these claims were largely false or "highly misleading". According to the World Health Organization, the closure of health clinics in 31 out of 34 provinces in Afghanistan has contributed to a growing humanitarian crisis. The situation is further compounded by widespread poverty and the continued presence of infectious diseases such as measles, malaria, and polio.

On February 3, 2025, White House press secretary Karoline Leavitt criticized four expenditures putatively uncovered by DOGE. Fact-checkers found that several of the alleged wasteful grants were actually administered by the State Department, not USAID. U.S. District Judge Carl Nichols, in his February 2025 order blocking the Trump administration from placing certain USAID employees on leave, "noted that despite Trump's claim of massive 'corruption and fraud' in the agency, government lawyers had no support for that argument in court."

In February 2025, following the allegations of fraud, the White House announced a plan to reduce USAID's staff from over 10,000 employees to fewer than 300. Critics, including former USAID administrators, decried this move, calling it "one of the worst and most costly foreign policy blunders in U.S. history", and have argued that the cuts will result in job losses, damage to American businesses, and harm to vulnerable populations worldwide. The inspector general for USAID issued a report on the spending pause and staff furloughs noting that these actions limited USAID's efforts to assure that its distributed funds "do not benefit terrorists and their supporters". The inspector general also warned that $489 million in humanitarian food aid was at risk of spoiling due to staff furloughs and unclear guidance. The Office of Presidential Personnel fired the inspector general the next day, despite a law requiring 30 days notice to Congress before firing an inspector general.

=== Bribery scheme involving $550 million in contracts ===
In June 2025, former USAID contracting officer Roderick Watson pleaded guilty to bribery of a public official in exchange for influencing USAID contract awards. Three company executives, including the heads of Apprio and Vistant and the president of a subcontractor, also pleaded guilty to charges arising from the decade-long scheme, which involved at least 14 prime contracts worth more than $550 million.

Beginning in 2013, the bribes allegedly provided to Watson included cash payments, electronic devices, NBA suite tickets, wedding expenses, assistance with mortgage down payments, and employment opportunities for relatives. Watson was alleged to have received bribes valued at more than $1 million. In return, he used his position to recommend Apprio and Vistant for contracts awarded without competition, to share sensitive procurement information, provide favorable performance evaluations, and approve contract decisions. The scheme involved companies participating in the Small Business Administration's 8(a) contracting program. After Apprio became ineligible for new prime contracts through the program, Vistant became the prime contractor and Apprio the subcontractor on contracts Watson influenced between 2018 and 2022.

=== Non-career contracts ===
USAID frequently contracted with private firms or individuals for specialist services lasting from a few weeks to several years. United States government staff directly performed technical assistance in the earliest days of the program in the 1940s. It soon became necessary for the federal government technical experts to plan and manage larger assistance programs than they could perform by themselves. The global expansion of technical assistance in the early 1950s reinforced the need to draw on outside experts, which was also accelerated by Congress's requirement of major reductions of U.S. government staffing in 1953. By 1955, observers commented on a perceived shift toward re use of shorter-term contracts (rather than using employees with career-length contracts).

=== Financial conflicts of interest ===
USAID stated that "U.S. foreign assistance has always had the twofold purpose of furthering America's foreign policy interests in expanding democracy and free markets while improving the lives of the citizens of the developing world." In 2008, a report found that approximately 40% of aid money spent in Afghanistan had returned to donor countries through corporate profits, consultants' salaries, and other costs.

Although USAID officially selects contractors on a competitive and objective basis, watchdog groups, politicians, foreign governments, and corporations have occasionally accused the agency of allowing its bidding process to be unduly influenced by the political and financial interests of its current presidential administration. Under the Bush administration, for instance, it emerged that all five implementing partners selected to bid on a $600 million Iraq reconstruction contract enjoyed close ties to the administration.

In 2020, one of the contractors for USAID, DAI Global, was sued by families of soldiers who had died in Afghanistan.

=== Political operations abroad ===
Critics have accused USAID of being a tool for US interventionism. Additionally, the agency has been accused of covert political operations abroad, allegedly collaborating with the CIA on regime-change efforts and controversial funding decisions, leading to strained relations with some foreign governments.

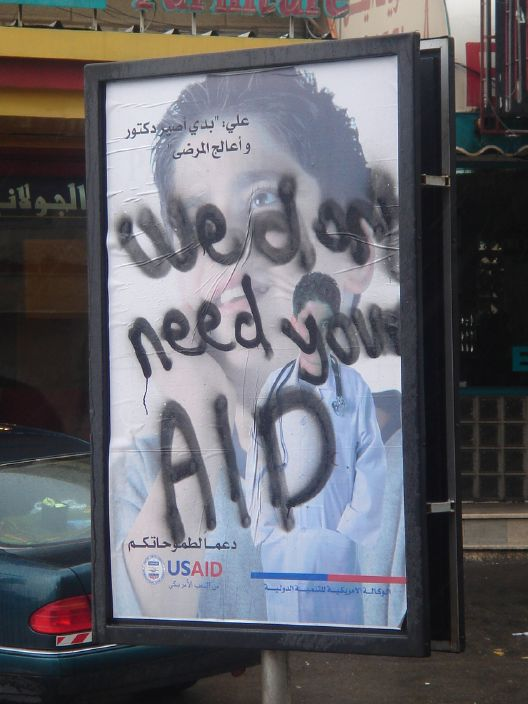
Critical graffiti on a USAID advertisement saying "We dont need your aid", West Bank, January 2007

William Blum has said that in the 1960s and early 1970s, USAID has maintained "a close working relationship with the CIA, and Agency officers often operated abroad under USAID cover." The 1960s-era Office of Public Safety, a now-disbanded division of USAID, has been mentioned as an example of this, having served as a front for training foreign police in counterinsurgency methods (including torture techniques).

In 2008, Benjamin Dangl wrote in The Progressive that the Bush administration was using USAID to fund efforts in Bolivia to "undermine the Morales government and coopt the country's dynamic social movements – just as it has tried to do recently in Venezuela and traditionally throughout Latin America".

From 2010 to 2012, the agency operated ZunZuneo, a social media site similar to Twitter in an attempt to instigate uprisings against the Cuban government. Its involvement was concealed in order to ensure mission success. The plan was to draw in users with non-controversial content until a critical mass is reached, after which more political messaging would be introduced. At its peak, more than 40,000 unsuspecting Cubans interacted on the platform.

In the summer of 2012, ALBA countries (Venezuela, Cuba, Ecuador, Bolivia, Nicaragua, Saint Vincent and the Grenadines, Dominica, Antigua and Barbuda) called on its members to expel USAID from their countries.

=== Influence on the United Nations ===
Studies have found correlations between U.S. foreign aid levels and nations' membership on the United Nations Security Council, suggesting the use of aid to influence council votes.

In 1990, after Yemen voted against a resolution for a U.S.-led coalition to use force against Iraq, U.S. ambassador to the UN Thomas Pickering told Yemen's UN ambassador Abdullah Saleh al-Ashtal, "That's the most expensive No vote you ever cast." Within days, USAID ceased operations and funding in Yemen.

=== State Department terrorist list ===
USAID required NGOs to sign a document renouncing terrorism, as a condition of funding. Issam Abdul Rahman, media coordinator for the Palestinian Non-Governmental Organizations' Network, a body representing 135 NGOs in the West Bank and Gaza Strip, said his organization "takes issue with politically conditioned funding". Also, the Popular Front for the Liberation of Palestine, listed as a terrorist organization by the US Department of State, said that the USAID condition was nothing more than an attempt "to impose political solutions prepared in the kitchens of Western intelligence agencies to weaken the rights and principles of Palestinians, especially the right of return."

=== Renouncing prostitution and sex trafficking ===
In 2003, Congress passed a law providing U.S. government funds to private groups to help fight AIDS and other diseases all over the world through USAID grants. One of the conditions imposed by the law on grant recipients was a requirement to have "a policy explicitly opposing prostitution and sex trafficking". In 2013, the U.S. Supreme Court ruled in Agency for International Development v. Alliance for Open Society International, Inc. that the requirement violated the First Amendment's prohibition against compelled speech.

=== Involvement in Peru's forced sterilizations ===
For three decades, USAID has been the principal foreign donor to family planning in Peru. Until the 1990s, the Peruvian government's commitment to providing family planning services was limited. In 1998, concerns arose regarding the involvement of USAID in forced sterilization campaigns in Peru. Some politicians in Washington opposed USAID's funding of family planning initiatives in the country. In January 1998, David Morrison, from the U.S.-based NGO Population Research Institute (PRI), traveled to Peru to investigate claims of human rights abuses related to these programs. During his visit, Morrison gathered testimony from Peruvian politicians and other figures opposed to family planning but did not meet with USAID officials in Peru. Upon his return to the United States, the PRI submitted its findings to U.S. congressman Chris Smith, a member of the Republican Party, urging for the suspension of USAID's family planning efforts in Peru. Smith subsequently dispatched a member of his staff to Peru for further investigation.

In February 1998, another U.S. organization, the Latin American Alliance for the Family, sent its director to Peru to examine the situation, again without consulting USAID officials. On February 25, 1998, a subcommittee of the U.S. House Committee on International Relations, chaired by Smith, held a hearing on "the Peruvian population control program". Allegations that USAID was funding forced sterilizations in Peru prompted Congressman Todd Tiahrt to introduce the "Tiahrt Amendment" in 1998. However, the subcommittee concluded that USAID's funding had not supported the abuses committed by the Peruvian government.

=== Office of Inspector General investigation into alleged terror-linked funding ===
According to a February 2024 report, the USAID's Office of Inspector General launched an investigation in 2023 into the agency for awarding $110,000 in 2021 to Helping Hand for Relief and Development (HHRD), a charity in Michigan that Republicans on the House Foreign Affairs Committee have accused in recent years of sharing ties to terrorism organizations in South Asia. In August 2023, USAID's Vetting Support Unit cleared HHRD to receive the grant. In 2024, researchers at George Mason University reported that allegations against HHRD were part of a campaign targeting large American Muslim charities based on the manipulation of poorly-sourced information.

== See also ==
- African Development Foundation
- Chemonics International
- Development Alternatives Inc.
- Development Experience Clearinghouse
- Erin Elizabeth McKee
- Feed the Future Initiative
- Food for Peace
- Global Alliance for Improved Nutrition
- Hard Choices
- John Granville
- List of development aid agencies
- Office of Transition Initiatives
- POPLINE
- Strengthening Emergency Response Abilities (SERA) Project
- The INFO Project
- United States foreign aid
- United States military aid
- U.S. International Development Finance Corporation
- Under Secretary of State for Foreign Assistance, Humanitarian Affairs, and Religious Freedom
- Bureau of Disaster and Humanitarian Response

== Sources ==
- Andrews, Stanley (1970). "Oral History Interview with Stanley Andrews". Harry S. Truman Library.
- Bollen, Kenneth; Paxton, Pamela; Morishima, Rumi (June 2005). "Assessing International Evaluations: An Example From USAID's Democracy and Governance Program". American Journal of Evaluation. 26 (2): 189–203. doi:10.1177/1098214005275640.
- Center for American Progress (August 14, 2008). "U.S. Aid to Afghanistan by the Numbers".
- Center for American Progress (August 21, 2008). "U.S. Aid to Pakistan by the Numbers".
- Dwight D. Eisenhower Library (August 2001). "Documents relating to foreign aid, 1948–90: Deposited by Albert H. Huntington Jr" (PDF). Archived from the original (PDF) on April 12, 2019.
- Hessmiller, Rose (January 10, 2013). "White Paper: U.S. Foreign Aid Meeting the Challenges of the Twenty-first Century". Natural Resources Management and Development Portal. USAID. Archived from the original on March 6, 2020.
- Johnston, Jake; Main, Alexander (April 2013). "Breaking Open the Black Box: Increasing Aid Transparency and Accountability in Haiti" (PDF). cepr.net. Center for Economic and Policy Research.
- Millikan, M. F.; Rostow, W. W. (1957). A proposal : key to an effective foreign policy. New York: Harper & Bros.
- Moseley, William G. (August 8, 2006). "America's lost vision: The demise of development". The New York Times.
- National Research Council (2008). Improving Democracy Assistance: Building Knowledge Through Evaluations and Research. Washington, D.C.: The National Academies Press. ISBN 978-0-309-11736-4.
- Shah, Arup (September 28, 2014). "Foreign Aid for Development Assistance". Global Issues.
- Tarnoff, Curt (July 21, 2015). U.S. Agency for International Development (USAID): Background, Operations, and Issues (Report).
- USAID (April 1995). "Historical Bibliography of the United States Agency for International Development" (PDF). PN-ABU-368. Archived from the original (PDF) on October 4, 2006.
- USAID (August 4, 2011). "Policy Framework for Bilateral Foreign Aid – Mandatory Reference for ADS Chapter 101 and 201" (PDF). Archived from the original (PDF) on April 12, 2019.
- USAID. "The Automated Directives System (ADS)". Operational Policy (ADS). Archived from the original on June 11, 2012.
- USAID (January 2006). "USAID Primer: What We Do and How We Do It" (PDF). PD-ACG-100. Archived from the original (PDF) on September 23, 2006.
- USAID (2016). U.S. Overseas Loans and Grants: Obligations and Loan Authorizations, July 1, 1945 – September 30, 2015 (Report). PB-AAF-100. Archived from the original on June 27, 2017.
- U.S. Department of State (June 1961). Highlights of President Kennedy's New Act for International Development (PDF). PC-AAB-618. Archived from the original (PDF) on September 26, 2007.
