= K38 Water Safety =

K38 Water Safety company that offers water safety training to lifeguards, military, fire rescue, and law enforcement. This includes training in operating personal water craft (PWC), Jet Skis, Kawasaki Heavy Industries, Waverunners, Aquatrax, PWC or RWC (Rescue Water Craft).

K38 was founded by Shawn Alladio.
