= United Nations Security Council Resolution 1048 =

UN Security Council Resolution 1048
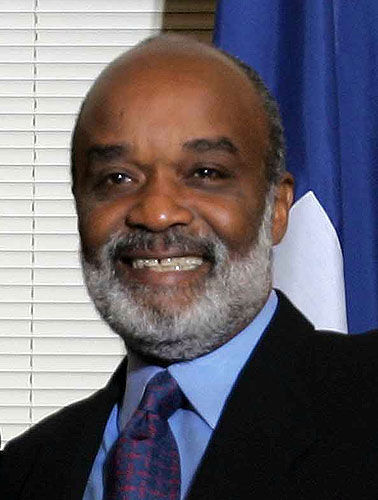
- René Préval, who was elected as President of Haiti in 1996
- Date: 29 February 1996
- Meeting no.: 3,638
- Code: S/RES/1048 (Document)
- Subject: The question concerning Haiti
- Voting summary: 15 voted for; None voted against; None abstained
- Result: Adopted

Security Council composition
- Permanent members: China; France; Russia; United Kingdom; United States
- Non-permanent members: Botswana; Chile; Egypt; Guinea-Bissau; Germany; Honduras; Indonesia; Italy; South Korea; Poland

United Nations Security Council resolution 1048, adopted unanimously on 29 February 1996, after recalling resolutions 841 (1993), 861 (1993), 862 (1993), 867 (1993), 873 (1993), 875 (1993), 905 (1994), 917 (1994), 933 (1994), 940 (1994), 944 (1994), 948 (1994), 964 (1994), 975 (1995) and 1007 (1995) on Haiti, the Council extended the mandate of the United Nations Mission in Haiti (UNMIH) for four months until 30 June 1996, and reduced its size.

The Security Council recalled the Governors Island Agreement and the Pact of New York and stressed that the power in Haiti peacefully to be transferred to the new democratically elected president. The efforts of the Organization of American States (OAS) were welcomed and there was progress in establishing a national police force and restoring the legal system.

The resolution welcomed the election of René Préval and the peaceful transfer of power on 7 February 1996. The Secretary-General Boutros Boutros-Ghali recommended that the United Nations continue to assist the Haitian government, and the importance of a fully functioning police force was stressed. For the purposes of assisting the government, maintaining a secure environment and training of the Haitian National Police, UNMIH's mandate was extended for four months. The troop and police level of UNMIH was reduced to 1,200 and 300 respectively.

Finally, the Secretary-General was to consider plans for the withdrawal of UNMIH, and to report to the council by 15 June 1996 on the activities of the United Nations to promote development in Haiti.

== See also ==
- Elections in Haiti
- History of Haiti
- List of United Nations Security Council Resolutions 1001 to 1100 (1995–1997)
- Operation Uphold Democracy
