= United Nations Security Council Resolution 1007 =

UN Security Council Resolution 1007
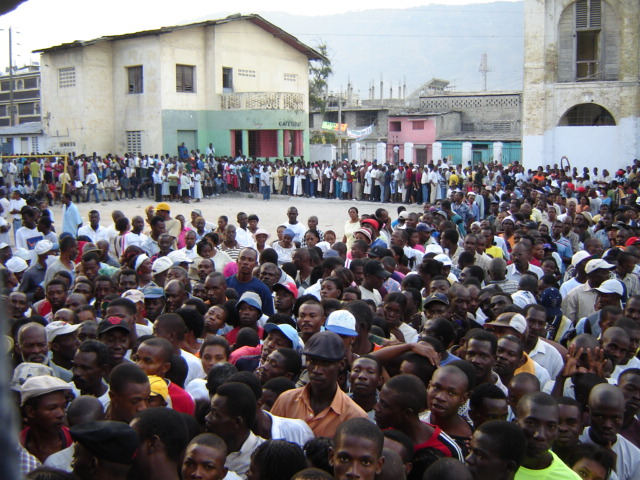
- Haitian voters
- Date: 31 July 1995
- Meeting no.: 3,559
- Code: S/RES/1007 (Document)
- Subject: Haiti
- Voting summary: 15 voted for; None voted against; None abstained
- Result: Adopted

Security Council composition
- Permanent members: China; France; Russia; United Kingdom; United States
- Non-permanent members: Argentina; Botswana; Czech Republic; Germany; Honduras; Indonesia; Italy; Nigeria; Oman; Rwanda

United Nations Security Council resolution 1007, adopted unanimously on 31 July 1995, after recalling resolutions 841 (1993), 861 (1993), 862 (1993), 867 (1993), 873 (1993), 875 (1993), 905 (1994), 917 (1994), 933 (1994), 940 (1994), 944 (1994), 948 (1994), 964 (1994) and 975 (1995), the Council discussed the election process and extended the mandate of the United Nations Mission in Haiti (UNMIH) for a further seven months.

The Security Council supported the role of UNMIH in assisting the Government of Haiti to achieve a secure and stable environment in the country. It was crucial that free and fair presidential elections took place. Efforts to establish a police force by UNMIH were praised, while UNMIH's mandate as a whole was being closely monitored by the council.

UNMIH and the International Civilian Mission (MICIVIH) were thanked for their contributions during the legislative elections on 25 June 1995, though there were serious concern over irregularities in the conduct of the first round of the elections. Additionally, the efforts of President Jean-Bertrand Aristide to promote national reconciliation were welcomed and the importance of a fully functioning national police force was stressed.

By extending UNMIH's mandate for seven months, the Council hoped that there would be a newly elected government in place and the mission could be terminated. Countries and international institutions were called upon to continue to support Haiti, while the Secretary-General Boutros Boutros-Ghali was requested to report to the Council halfway through UNMIH's mandate period.

== See also ==
- Elections in Haiti
- History of Haiti
- List of United Nations Security Council Resolutions 1001 to 1100 (1995–1997)
- Operation Uphold Democracy
