= United Nations Security Council Resolution 975 =

UN Security Council Resolution 975
- Haiti
- Date: 30 January 1995
- Meeting no.: 3,496
- Code: S/RES/975 (Document)
- Subject: Haiti
- Voting summary: 14 voted for; None voted against; 1 abstained
- Result: Adopted

Security Council composition
- Permanent members: China; France; Russia; United Kingdom; United States
- Non-permanent members: Argentina; Botswana; Czech Republic; Germany; Honduras; Indonesia; Italy; Nigeria; Oman; Rwanda

United Nations Security Council resolution 975, adopted on 30 January 1995, after recalling resolutions 841 (1993), 861 (1993), 862 (1993), 867 (1993), 873 (1993), 875 (1993), 905 (1994), 917 (1994), 933 (1994), 940 (1994), 944 (1994), 948 (1994) and 964 (1994), the Council discussed the transfer of responsibility from the Multinational Force (MNF) to the United Nations Mission in Haiti (UNMIH) and extended the mandate of UNMIH for a further six months until 31 July 1995.

The MNF was deployed to Haiti to secure a stable environment before the UNMIH mission would be deployed; that environment was now established by the MNF.

Positive developments in Haiti, including the return of elected government and President Jean-Bertrand Aristide, were welcomed, as were the contributions from the Organization of American States and International Civilian Mission. The deployment of UNMIH was already prepared. The Secretary-General Boutros Boutros-Ghali was authorised to recruit and deploy military, police and civilian components of UNMIH. All functions of the MNF were to be taken over by 31 March 1995 and in this time-frame, up to 6,000 troops and 900 police were to be deployed.

The international community was called upon to support the development of Haiti and assist in the creation of a police force and judicial system. The secretary-general was requested to report back by 15 April 1995 on the transition from the MNF to UNMIH.

Resolution 975 was approved by 14 votes from the council and none against, while China abstained.

== See also ==
- History of Haiti
- List of United Nations Security Council Resolutions 901 to 1000 (1994–1995)
- Operation Uphold Democracy
