= United Nations Security Council Resolution 964 =

UN Security Council Resolution 964
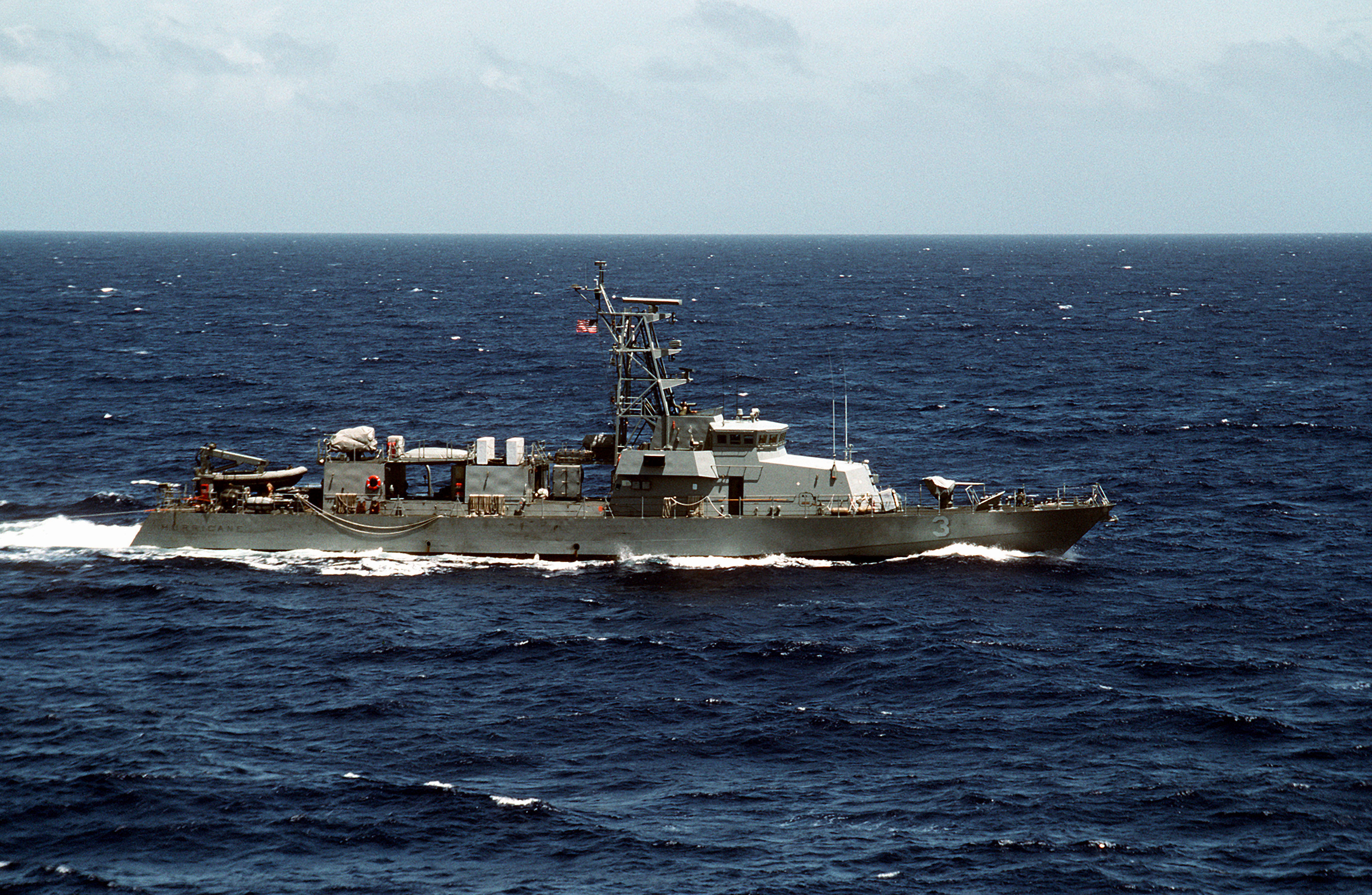
- USS Hurricane (PC-3) during Operation Uphold Democracy
- Date: 29 November 1994
- Meeting no.: 3,470
- Code: S/RES/964 (Document)
- Subject: Haiti
- Voting summary: 13 voted for; None voted against; 2 abstained
- Result: Adopted

Security Council composition
- Permanent members: China; France; Russia; United Kingdom; United States
- Non-permanent members: Argentina; Brazil; Czech Republic; Djibouti; New Zealand; Nigeria; Oman; Pakistan; Rwanda; Spain

United Nations Security Council resolution 964, adopted on 29 November 1994, after recalling resolutions 841 (1993), 861 (1993), 862 (1993), 867 (1993), 873 (1993), 875 (1993), 905 (1994), 917 (1994), 933 (1994), 940 (1994), 944 (1994) and 948 (1994), the council noted the progress in Haiti and strengthened the advance team of the United Nations Mission in Haiti (UNMIH).

The efforts of the Multinational Force in Haiti to establish a secure and stable for the deployment UNMIH were welcomed, along with President Jean-Bertrand Aristide who was promoting national reconciliation. The establishment of a joint working group to prepare for the transition from the multinational force to UNMIH by the advance team was also welcomed. The advance team was then strengthened by up to 500 personnel required for the transition to UNMIH. The Secretary-General Boutros Boutros-Ghali was requested to report to the council on increases in the strength of the UNMIH advance team, while close co-operation between the multinational force and UNMIH was urged.

Resolution 964 was adopted by 13 votes to none and two abstentions from Brazil and Russia.

== See also ==
- History of Haiti
- List of United Nations Security Council Resolutions 901 to 1000 (1994–1995)
- Operation Uphold Democracy
