= United Nations Security Council Resolution 948 =

UN Security Council Resolution 948
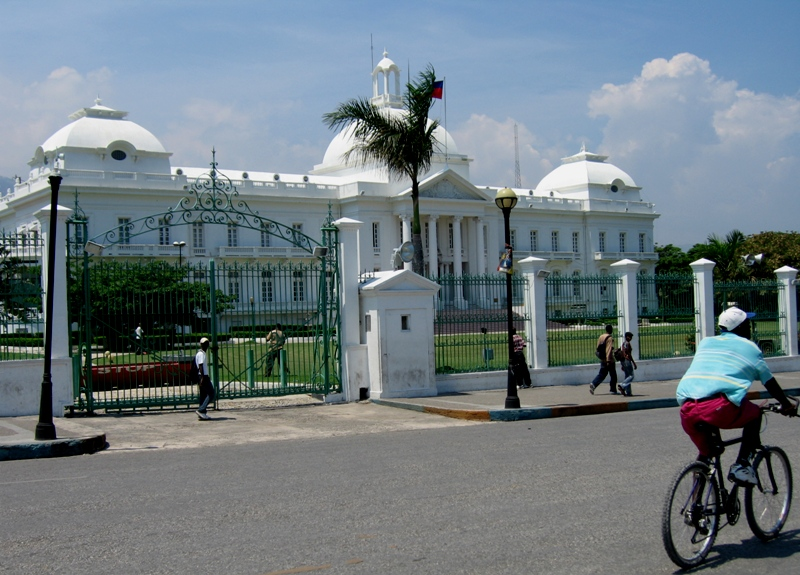
- Presidential palace in Haiti
- Date: 15 October 1994
- Meeting no.: 3,437
- Code: S/RES/948 (Document)
- Subject: Haiti
- Voting summary: 14 voted for; None voted against; 1 abstained
- Result: Adopted

Security Council composition
- Permanent members: China; France; Russia; United Kingdom; United States
- Non-permanent members: Argentina; Brazil; Czech Republic; Djibouti; New Zealand; Nigeria; Oman; Pakistan; Rwanda; Spain

United Nations Security Council resolution 948, adopted on 15 October 1994, after recalling resolutions 841 (1993), 861 (1993), 862 (1993), 867 (1993), 873 (1993), 875 (1993), 905 (1994), 917 (1994), 933 (1994), 940 (1994) and 944 (1994), the Council welcomed the return of the legitimate President of Haiti Jean-Bertrand Aristide and lifted sanctions imposed on the country.

The Council went on to welcome the process of implementing the Governors Island Agreement, the New York Pact, and the objectives of the United Nations with the convening of the Haitian National Parliament, expressing full support to all democratic institutions and leaders in the country and all states and organisations that had contributed to this outcome. The efforts of the multinational force established in Resolution 940 were also recognised.

The United Nations Mission in Haiti (UNMIH) would replace the multinational force when a stable environment was established, supporting the efforts of the Secretary-General Boutros Boutros-Ghali to complete the composition of UNMIH. A new appointment of the Special Representative of the Secretary-General was welcomed, urging co-operation between the Secretaries-General of the United Nations and Organization of American States especially with regard to the return of the International Civilian Mission to Haiti.

Resolution 948 was adopted by 14 votes to none against, while Brazil abstained from the voting.

== See also ==
- History of Haiti
- List of United Nations Security Council Resolutions 901 to 1000 (1994–1995)
- Operation Uphold Democracy
