= United Nations Security Council Resolution 944 =

UN Security Council Resolution 944
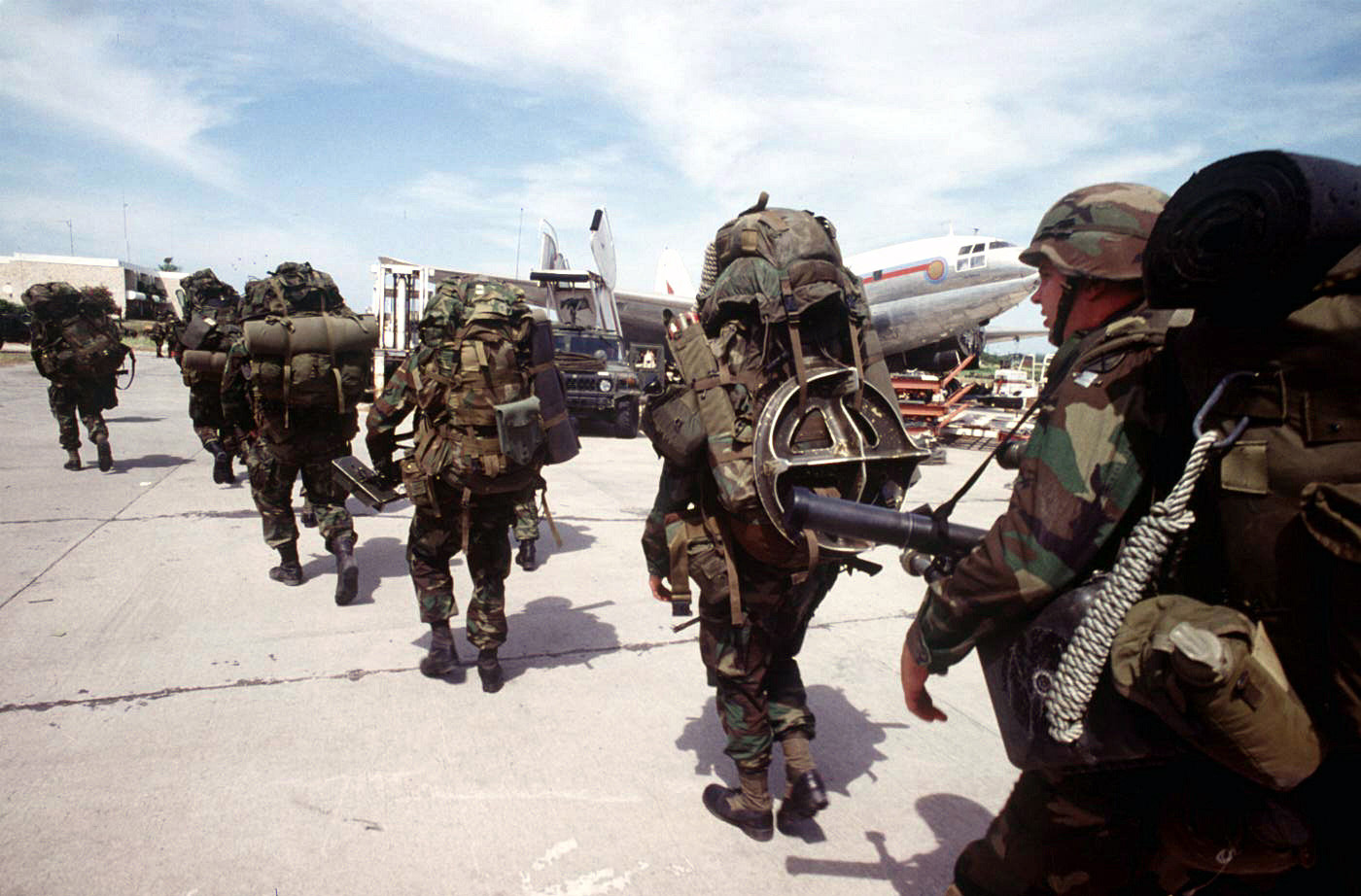
- Troops arriving at Toussaint Louverture International Airport on the first day of the operation
- Date: 29 September 1994
- Meeting no.: 3,430
- Code: S/RES/944 (Document)
- Subject: Haiti
- Voting summary: 13 voted for; None voted against; 2 abstained
- Result: Adopted

Security Council composition
- Permanent members: China; France; Russia; United Kingdom; United States
- Non-permanent members: Argentina; Brazil; Czech Republic; Djibouti; New Zealand; Nigeria; Oman; Pakistan; Rwanda; Spain

United Nations Security Council Resolution 944, adopted on 29 September 1994, after recalling resolutions 841 (1993), 861 (1993), 862 (1993), 867 (1993), 873 (1993), 875 (1993), 905 (1994), 917 (1994), 933 (1994) and 940 (1994), the Council affirmed its willingness to suspend sanctions against Haiti once the legitimate President Jean-Bertrand Aristide had returned following the removal of the military junta.

The Council affirmed its objectives of the departure of the de facto authorities, the return of Jean-Bertrand Aristide and the restoration of the legitimate Government of Haiti. It welcomed that initial units of the multinational force were peacefully deployed on 19 September 1994, and awaited the completion of its mission and to the deployment of the United Nations Mission in Haiti (UNMIH).

The Secretary-General Boutros Boutros-Ghali was requested to take steps to ensure the immediate completion of the deployment of the 60-person UNMIH advance team, urging member states to contribute towards UNMIH. He was further requested to seek the return, in conjunction with the Organization of American States (OAS), of the International Civilian Mission to Haiti which was previously expelled.

Acting under Chapter VII of the United Nations Charter, the council decided to terminate the measures in resolutions 841, 873 and 917 regarding Haiti at 00:01 EST on the day after the return of President Jean-Bertrand Aristide. The committee established in Resolution 841 would also be dissolved at the same time. Finally, the secretary-general was asked to consult with the Secretary-General of the Organization of American States regarding measures taken by the OAS consistent with the present resolution.

Resolution 944 was adopted by 13 votes to none, with two abstentions from Brazil and Russia.

== See also ==
- History of Haiti
- List of United Nations Security Council Resolutions 901 to 1000 (1994–1995)
- Operation Uphold Democracy
