= United Nations Medal =

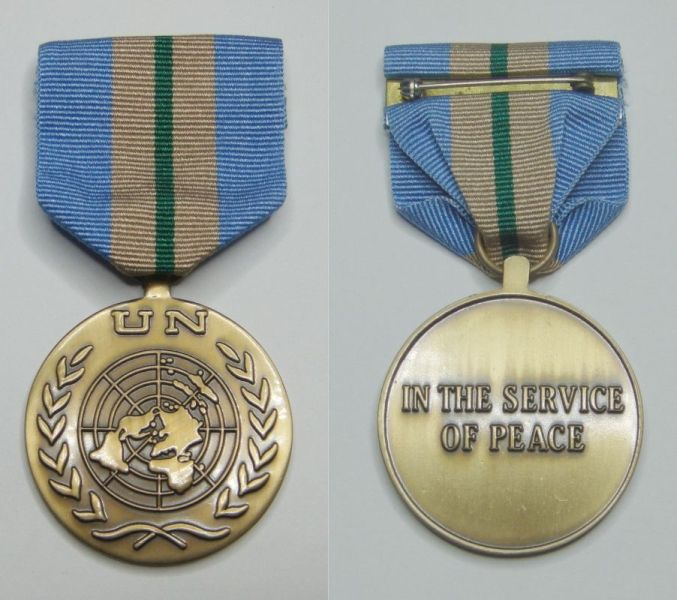
- United Nations Medal awarded for service with UNMEE
- Type: Military medal Service medal
- Awarded for: Service with a designated United Nations peacekeeping mission
- Country: Various
- Presented by: The United Nations
- Status: Currently awarded

A United Nations Medal is an international decoration awarded by the United Nations (UN) to the various world countries members for participation in joint international military and police operations such as peacekeeping, humanitarian efforts, and disaster relief. The medal is ranked in militaries and police forces as a service medal. The United Nations awarded its first medal during the Korean War (1950–1953). Since 1955, many additional United Nations medals have been created and awarded for participation in various United Nations missions and actions around the world.

== United Nations Medal ==
The most common United Nations medal is the standard UN decoration known simply as the United Nations Medal. Most countries bestow this award for any action in which a member of the military participated in a joint UN activity.

In situations where a service member participated in multiple UN operations, service stars, campaign clasps, or award numbers are authorized as attachments to the United Nations Medal. These devices vary depending on the regulations of the various armed forces.

The UN has authorised the award of numerals to be attached to the medal ribbon. The qualification for these numerals is not to indicate the number of campaigns served in, but rather the number of qualifying periods of service. Which are counted as 180 days after the initial qualifying period of 90 days if the service is performed as 270 days consecutive. For two or more deployments, each deployment has to be at least 90 consecutive days each.

== United Nations Korea Medal ==
UN Korea Medal

The first United Nations medal to be created was the United Nations Service Medal, also known as the United Nations Service Medal Korea, was awarded to any military service member, of an Armed Force allied with South Korea, who participated in the defense of South Korea from North Korea between 27 June 1950 and 27 July 1953. The military forces of the Netherlands are awarded the medal for service to January 1, 1955, while the armed forces of Thailand and Sweden grant the award to July 27, 1955.

== United Nations Emergency Force Medal ==
United Nations Emergency Force Medal (UNEF)

In 1956, to maintain the peace which brought the end of the Suez Crisis the United Nations Emergency Force was established. This was the first Peacekeeping operation of the United Nations. To reward the service of troops from Brazil, Canada, Colombia, Denmark, India, Norway, Sweden and Yugoslavia those troops who completed ninety days of service with the UNEF were awarded the United Nations Emergency Force Medal. The mission lasted from November 1956 until June 1967. It is unique from other United Nations Medals in that instead of saying UN on the obverse, it says UNEF. Subsequent missions did not use the mission’s abbreviation on its medals.

== United Nations Medal ribbons ==
In most nations, the standard United Nations Medal is awarded in lieu of a campaign-specific medal. Most operations utilize a different ribbon for each mission, though there have been some notable exceptions. In some countries where the UN Security Council determines a mission in the same geographic region, but changes the mission mandate by way of Security Council Resolution, there may be a number of missions which have identical campaign ribbons and then later will change the ribbon to reflect the changing environment.

The United Nations Mission in Haiti (UNMIH) was originally established by United Nations Security Council Resolution 867 on 23 September 1993 and lasted until in June 1996. This mission was an effort to end the conflict and instability caused by the 1991 Haitian coup d'état. Subsequent missions to maintain stability and train the Haitian National Police were undertaken under UNSMIH, UNTMIH, MIPONUH, and MICAH. These subsequent missions all used the same ribbon as UNMIH.

In East Timor, the medals awarded for UNAMET, UNTAET and UNMISET all have the same ribbon.

Years	Ribbon bar	Operation	Operation area
1948–	United Nations Medal	UNTSO	Middle East
1949–	United Nations Medal	UNMOGIP	India, Pakistan
1958	United Nations Medal	UNOGIL	Lebanon, Syria
1960–1964	United Nations Medal	ONUC	Congo
1962–1963	United Nations Medal	UNSF	West New Guinea
1963–1964	United Nations Medal	UNYOM	Yemen
1964–	United Nations Medal	UNFICYP	Cyprus
1965–1966	United Nations Medal	DOMREP	Dominican Republic
1965–1966	United Nations Medal	UNIPOM	India, Pakistan
1973–1979	United Nations Medal	UNEF II	Egypt, Israel
1974–	United Nations Medal	UNDOF	Golan Heights
1978–	United Nations Medal	UNIFIL	Lebanon
1988–1991	United Nations Medal	UNIIMOG	Iraq, Iran
1988–1990	United Nations Medal	UNGOMAP	Afghanistan, Pakistan
1988–1991	United Nations Medal	UNAVEM I	Angola
1989–1990	United Nations Medal	UNTAG	Namibia
1989–1992	United Nations Medal	ONUCA	Central America
1991–2003	United Nations Medal	UNIKOM	Kuwait, Iraq
1991–	United Nations Medal	MINURSO	Western Sahara
1991–1995	United Nations Medal	UNAVEM II	Angola
1991–1995	United Nations Medal	ONUSAL	El Salvador
1991–2003	United Nations Medal	UNGCI	Iraq
1991–1992	United Nations Medal	UNAMIC	Cambodia
1992–1995	United Nations Medal	UNPROFOR	Croatia and Bosnia and Herzegovina during the Yugoslav Wars
1992–1993	United Nations Medal	UNTAC	Cambodia
1992–1993	United Nations Medal	UNOSOM I	Somalia
1992–1994	United Nations Medal	ONUMOZ	Mozambique
1993–1995	United Nations Medal	UNOSOM II	Somalia
1993–1994	United Nations Medal	UNOMUR	Rwanda, Uganda
1993–2009	United Nations Medal	UNOMIG	Georgia
1993–1997	United Nations Medal	UNOMIL	Liberia
1993–1996	United Nations Medal	UNAMIR	Rwanda
1993–1996	United Nations Medal	UNMIH	Haiti
1994	United Nations Medal	UNASOG	Libya Chad
1994–2000	United Nations Medal	UNMOT	Tajikistan during civil war
1995–1997	United Nations Medal	UNAVEM III	Angola
1995–1999	United Nations Medal	UNPREDEP	Macedonia
1995–1996	United Nations Medal	UNCRO	Croatia

Years	Ribbon bar	Operation	Operation area
1995–2002	United Nations Medal	UNMIBH	Bosnia-Herzegovina
1996–1998	United Nations Medal	UNTAES	Croatia
1996–1997		UNSMIH	Haiti
1996–2002		UNMOP	Croatia
1997		MINUGUA	Guatemala
1997–1999		MONUA	Angola
1997		UNTMIH	Haiti
1997–2000		MIPONUH	Haiti
1998		UNPSG	Croatia
1998–2000		MINURCA	Central African Republic
1998–1999		UNOMSIL	Sierra Leone
1999–		UNMIK	Kosovo
1999		UNAMET	East Timor
1999–2005		UNAMSIL	Sierra Leone
1999–2002		UNTAET	East Timor
1999–2010		MONUC	Democratic Republic of the Congo
2000–2001		MICAH	Haiti
2000–2008		UNMEE	Eritrea, Ethiopia
2002–2005		UNMISET	East Timor
2003–2018		UNMIL	Liberia
2003–2004		MINUCI	Ivory Coast
2004–2018		UNOCI	Ivory Coast
2004–2017		MINUSTAH	Haiti
2004–2006		ONUB	Burundi
2005–2011		UNMIS	Sudan
2006–2012		UNMIT	East Timor
2007–2020		UNAMID*	Sudan
2007–2010		MINURCAT	Central African Republic, Chad
2010–		MONUSCO	Democratic Republic of the Congo
2011–		UNISFA	Sudan
2011–		UNMISS	South Sudan
2012		UNSMIS	Syria
2013–2023		MINUSMA	Mali
2014–		MINUSCA	Central African Republic
2017–2019		MINUJUSTH	Haiti
2021–2024	Need image	UNITAMS	Sudan
1974–		UNHQ	For service in the United Nations Headquarters

- For the UNAMID medal, the ribbon design was changed after 2008 from the predominately yellow pattern to the blue/green/yellow/white pattern.

== United Nations Special Service Medal ==
UNSSM ribbon

For 90 days of service with a United Nations mission or organization where there is no specific approved United Nations medal, personnel may be eligible for the United Nations Special Service Medal (UNSSM). Some examples of qualifying service are the United Nations Assistance Mission in Iraq, or the United Nations Department of Humanitarian Affairs Accelerated De-Mining Programme (MADP) in Mozambique, work with the United Nations Development Programme (UNDP), and more.

== Receipt and wear of UN Medals ==
=== France, Australia, Canada and New Zealand ===
Some nations, such as France, the Commonwealth of Australia, Canada and New Zealand permit members of the military and police to receive and display multiple United Nations Medals as separate decorations.

=== Ukraine ===
Personnel of the Armed Forces are allowed to wear United Nations medals if they choose to. Such medals shall be worn after National and Presidential decorations, decorations of the Ministry of Defense, decorations of the General Staff, decorations of other military units, Ministries and departments and before decorations of the European Union and NATO in order of award.

=== United Kingdom ===
Other countries, in particular the United Kingdom, permit British citizens to receive the relevant United Nations medal and authorization for it to be worn is given by the FCDO (Foreign, Commonwealth and Development Office). Numerals may be added to denote multiple tours to one mission, the medals are worn in order of award and take precedence alongside British campaign medals.

=== United States ===
In the United States Armed Forces, prior to 13 October 1995, all US military personnel wore the blue and white United Nations Ribbon regardless of the ribbon awarded. On 13 October 1995, the Assistant Secretary of Defense (Personnel and Readiness) approved a change to the wear policy of the United Nations Medal. Effective on that date, personnel who are awarded the United Nations Medal may wear the first medal and ribbon for which they qualify, adding a bronze service star for subsequent awards of the United Nations Medal for service in a different mission. No more than one UN medal or ribbon may be worn at a time. On US uniforms, the UN Medal is worn before the NATO Medal, except for the United Nations Korea Medal, which is worn as a campaign medal just before the Vietnam Campaign Medal.

US military personnel are eligible to wear the medal from one of the following United Nations operations as their one approved medal:

- UN Truce Supervisory Organization in Palestine (UNTSO)
- UN Military Observers Group in India and Pakistan (UNMOGIP)
- UN Observation Group in Lebanon (UNOGIL)
- UN Security Forces, Hollandia (UNSFH)
- UN Temporary Executive Authority (UNTEA)
- UN Security Force in West New Guinea [West Irian] (UNSF)
- UN Iraq/Kuwait Observation Group (UNIKOM)
- UN Mission for the Referendum in Western Sahara (MINURSO)
- UN Advance Mission in Cambodia (UNAMIC)
- UN Protection Force in Yugoslavia (UNPROFOR)
- UN Transitional Authority in Cambodia (UNTAC)
- UN Operation Somalia (UNOSOM)
- UN Operation in Mozambique (ONUMOZ)
- UN Observer Mission in Georgia (UNOMIG)
- UN Mission in Haiti (UNMIH)
- UN Preventive Deployment Force (UNPREDEP)
- UN Transitional Administrational Administration for Eastern Slavonia, Baranja and Western Sirium (UNTAES)
- UN Support Mission in Haiti (UNSMIH)
- UN Verification Mission in Guatemala (MINUGUA)
- UN Interim Administration in Kosovo (UNMIK)
- UN Assistance Mission in East Timor (UNAMET)
- UN Transitional Administration in East Timor (UNTAET)
- UN Organization Mission in the Democratic Republic of the Congo (MONUC)
- UN Mission in Ethiopia and Eritrea (UNMEE)
- UN Mission of Support in East Timor (UNMISET)
- UN Mission in Liberia (UNMIL)
- UN Stabilization Mission in Haiti (MINUSTAH)
- African Union / United Nations Hybrid Operation In Darfur (UNAMID)
- UN Mission in the Central African Republic and Chad (MINURCAT)
- UN Organization Stabilization Mission in the Democratic Republic of the Congo (MONUSCO)
- UN Multidimensional Integrated Stabilization Mission in the Central African Republic (MINUSCA)
- UN Multidimensional Integrated Stabilization Mission in Mali (MINUSMA)

=== Argentina ===
Members of the Argentinian Armed Forces are allowed to wear the different UN medals as separate decorations. However, authorization for use must be formally requested for every single medal, and is granted on an individual basis. Regulations for the use of either medals or ribbons apply for each uniform. In the Argentinian Army, a national-issued, maroon-and-white bar showing the number of tours of duty may be worn in lieu of (but not together with) the UN-issued ribbons.

=== Switzerland ===
Members of the Swiss Armed Forces are allowed to wear one UN ribbon (of their choice between all UN awarded decorations). The ribbon is to be worn before EU (Althea Mission) or NATO ribbons but after the Swiss ribbons. Numbers are allowed on the UN ribbon as well as on other allowed "foreign" ribbons.

=== Malaysia ===
Malaysian awardees are granted the post nominal of PNBB (Pingat Perkhidmatan Negara Bangsa-Bangsa Bersatu).

== See also ==
- International decoration
- Common Security and Defence Policy Service Medal
- Multinational Force and Observers Medal
- NATO Medal
