= United Nations Security Council Resolution 940 =

UN Security Council Resolution 940
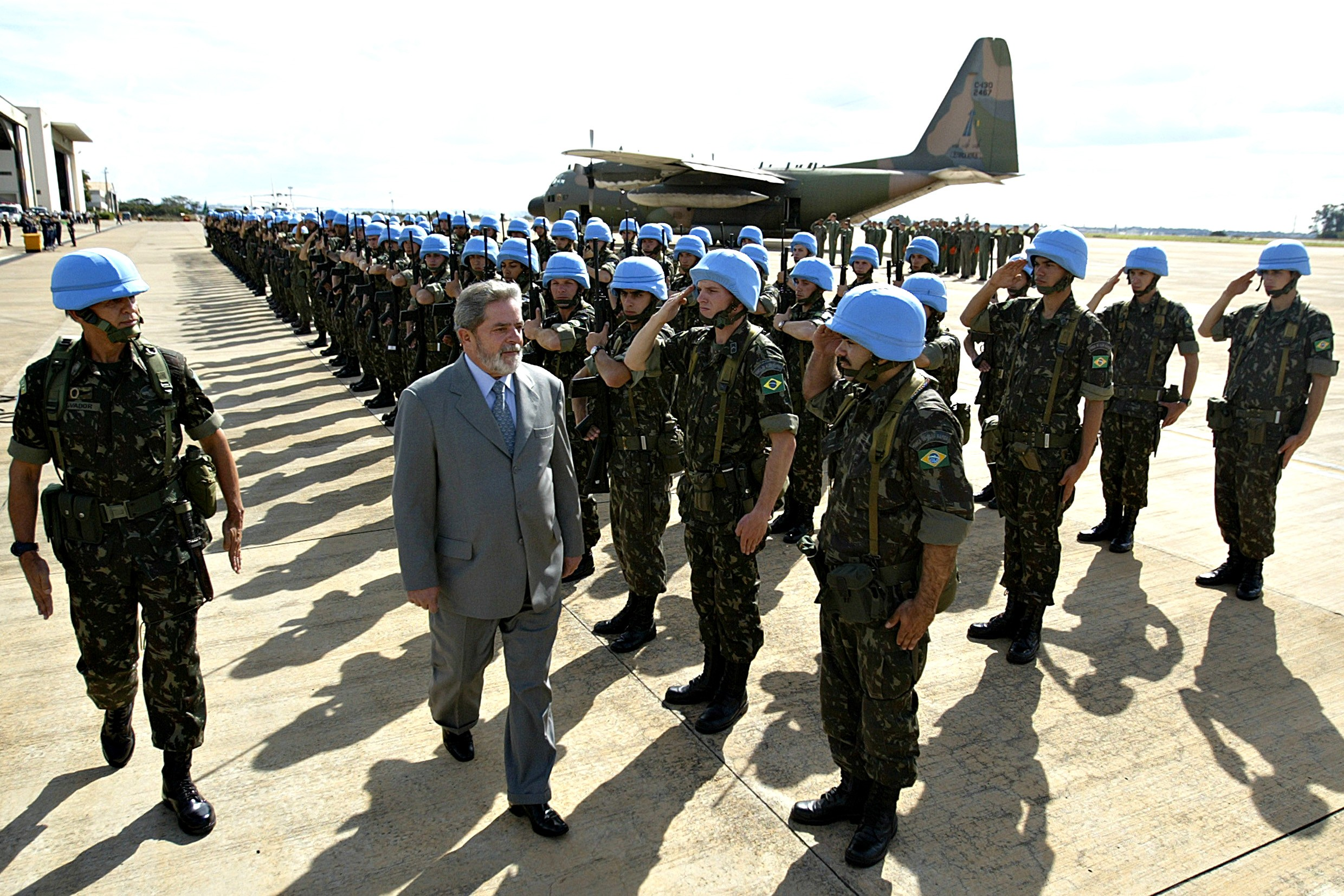
- Peacekeepers in Haiti
- Date: 31 July 1994
- Meeting no.: 3,413
- Code: S/RES/940 (Document)
- Subject: Haiti
- Voting summary: 12 voted for; None voted against; 2 abstained; 1 absent
- Result: Adopted

Security Council composition
- Permanent members: China; France; Russia; United Kingdom; United States
- Non-permanent members: Argentina; Brazil; Czech Republic; Djibouti; New Zealand; Nigeria; Oman; Pakistan; Rwanda; Spain

United Nations Security Council resolution 940 was adopted on 31 July 1994. After recalling resolutions 841 (1993), 861 (1993), 862 (1993), 867 (1993), 873 (1993), 875 (1993), 905 (1994), 917 (1994) and 933 (1994), the Council permitted a United States-led force to restore President Jean-Bertrand Aristide and authorities of the Government of Haiti, and extended the mandate of the United Nations Mission in Haiti (UNMIH) for an additional six months.

== Resolution ==
The council began with condemnations of the military regime in Haiti because it had refused to co-operate with the United Nations. Some concern was also expressed at the deteriorating humanitarian situation in the country, violations of civil liberties and expulsion of staff from the International Civilian Mission (MICIVIH).

The resolution claimed an extraordinary situation in Haiti, which required an exceptional response. The Council then authorised, under Chapter VII of the United Nations Charter, for Member States to form a multinational force under US command to overthrow current leaders from Haiti, and for previous ones to return to an environment in which a United States agreement could be implemented. An advance team of no more than 60 personnel was established in order to co-ordinate and observe the American operations, requesting the Secretary-General Boutros Boutros-Ghali to report back on developments relating to the advance team within 30 days.

Once the multinational force had completed its mission, UNMIH would take over its functions when a suitable environment had been secured. After extending UNMIH's mandate for six months, it was decided to increase the size of the mission to 6,000 troops with the aim of completing it by February 1996. The safety of United Nations personnel and those from diplomatic missions and international humanitarian organisations would be guaranteed. Finally, international sanctions imposed on Haiti would be lifted once Aristide had been returned to power.

Resolution 940 was controversially adopted by 12 votes to none, with two abstentions from Brazil and China, while Rwanda was not present when voting took place, most likely due to the ongoing Rwandan Genocide. Accusations surfaced of US pressure.

== Reaction ==
The vote was the first time the United Nations sanctioned the use of an invading force to "restore democracy". It was also the first time the US sought and gained UN approval for a military intervention in the Americas.

Many Latin American countries were opposed to the resolution. Mexico's permanent representative to the UN, Víctor Flores Olea, spoke out against the resolution, saying that it set "an extremely dangerous precedent in the field of international relations" because the crisis did "not constitute a threat to peace and international security". Cuban Foreign Minister Roberto Robaina said that the resolution furthered "the repeated attempts by the Security Council to amplify its powers beyond those which were granted it by the Charter".

Brazilian President Itamar Franco strongly opposed the UN decision, saying "The Security Council's special powers should not be invoked in an indiscriminate manner in the name of a 'search for more rapid means' to respond to attacks on democracy, because it violates the basic principles of peaceful co-existence between nations and normal UN legal procedures". After a visit to Brazil from U.S. Under Secretary of State Peter Tarnoff the week before the vote, Brazil's decision to abstain instead of oppose the resolution can clearly be seen to be the result of enormous U.S. pressure.

Pointing out that the situation in Haiti posed no threat to world peace and security, Uruguay's UN representative Ramiro Piriz Ballon said his country would "not support any military intervention, unilateral or multilateral".

Argentina initially offered to send four marine and infantry companies to join the U.S.-led invasion forces. However, after popular discontent over the decision, President Carlos Menem was forced to back down on the offer.

On 17 January 1995, UN Secretary-General Boutros Boutros-Ghali issued a 17-page report on the result of the intervention: the report noted the ongoing repression in Haiti, the complete lack of justice for victims of the September 1991 coup d'état, the deteriorating economic situation, and the growing impatience of the Haitian people.

== See also ==
- History of Haiti
- List of United Nations Security Council Resolutions 901 to 1000 (1994–1995)
- Operation Uphold Democracy
