= United Nations Security Council Resolution 1085 =

UN Security Council Resolution 1085
- Haiti
- Date: 29 November 1996
- Meeting no.: 3,719
- Code: S/RES/1085 (Document)
- Subject: The question concerning Haiti
- Voting summary: 15 voted for; None voted against; None abstained
- Result: Adopted

Security Council composition
- Permanent members: China; France; Russia; United Kingdom; United States
- Non-permanent members: Botswana; Chile; Egypt; Guinea-Bissau; Germany; Honduras; Indonesia; Italy; South Korea; Poland

United Nations Security Council resolution 1085, adopted unanimously on 29 November 1996, after recalling Resolution 1063 (1996), the Council decided to extend the mandate of the United Nations Support Mission in Haiti for an interim period until 5 December 1996. It was further discussed in Resolution 1086 (1996).

== See also ==
- History of Haiti
- List of United Nations Security Council Resolutions 1001 to 1100 (1995–1997)
- Operation Uphold Democracy
- United Nations Mission in Haiti
