= United Nations Security Council Resolution 1141 =

UN Security Council Resolution 1141
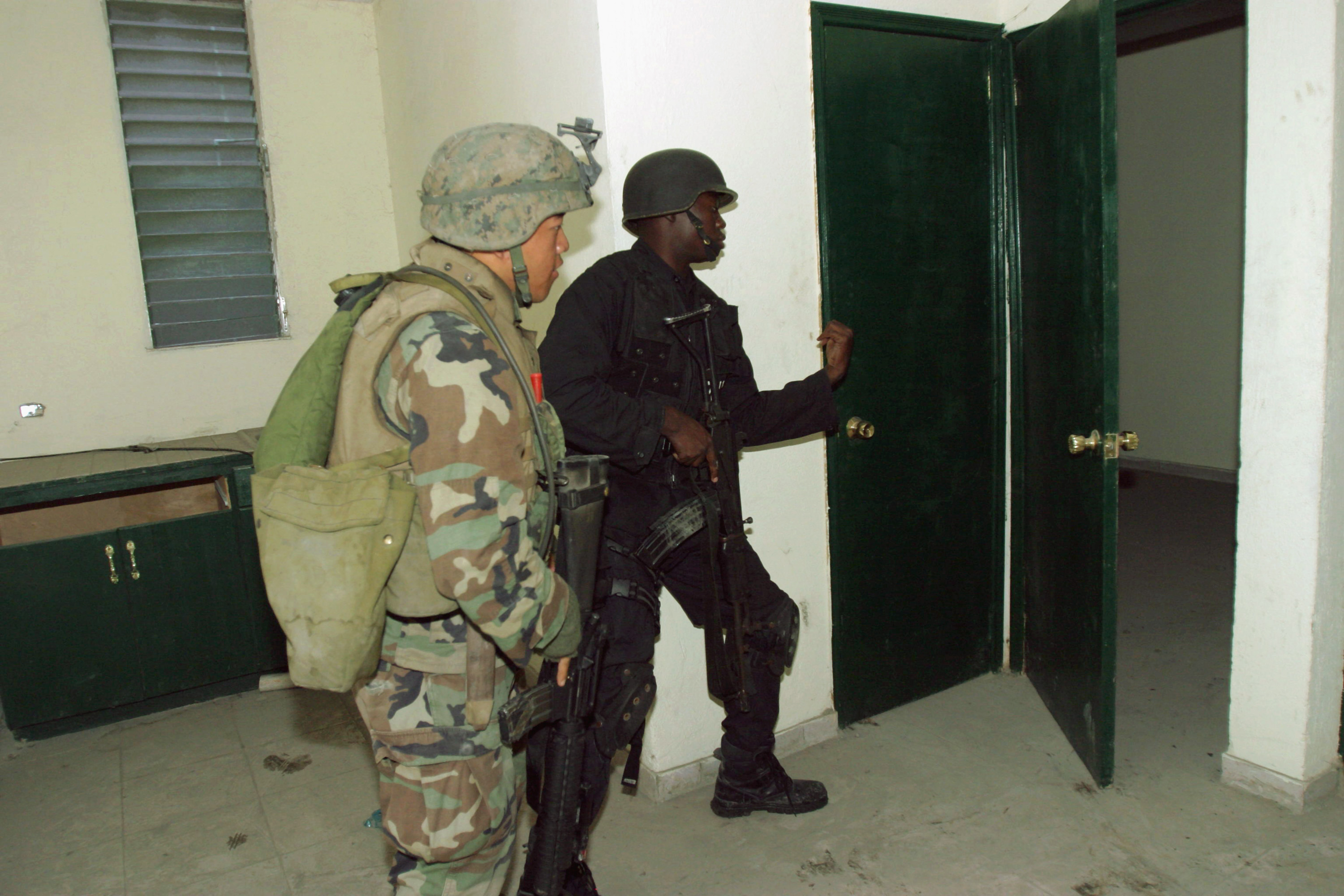
- Haitian police training
- Date: 28 November 1997
- Meeting no.: 3,837
- Code: S/RES/1141 (Document)
- Subject: The question concerning Haiti
- Voting summary: 15 voted for; None voted against; None abstained
- Result: Adopted

Security Council composition
- Permanent members: China; France; Russia; United Kingdom; United States
- Non-permanent members: Chile; Costa Rica; Egypt; Guinea-Bissau; Japan; Kenya; South Korea; Poland; Portugal; Sweden

United Nations Security Council resolution 1141, adopted unanimously on 28 November 1997, after recalling all relevant Security Council and General Assembly resolutions on Haiti and noting the termination of the United Nations Transition Mission in Haiti in accordance with Resolution 1123 (1997), the council established the United Nations Civilian Police Mission in Haiti (MIPONUH) to continue assisting Haiti's police for a year.

The security council recognised that the United Nations police missions had played an important role in the professionalisation of the Haitian National Police and restoration of justice in Haiti and the progress towards the "Haitian national police development plan for 1997–2001". It also stressed the need for support from the international community for the economic, social and institutional development in Haiti.

The importance of a professional and fully functioning police force with sufficient size and structure was important to consolidate democracy and revitalise the justice system in Haiti. In this regard, MIPONUH, consisting of 300 civilian police, was established with a single mandate until 30 November 1998 in order to support the professionalisation of the Haitian National Police. Further assistance was to be provided through agencies including the United Nations Development Programme. Finally, the Secretary-General Kofi Annan was requested to report every three months on the implementation of the current resolution, before the mandate of MIPONUH expired.

== See also ==
- History of Haiti
- List of United Nations Security Council Resolutions 1101 to 1200 (1997–1998)
- Operation Uphold Democracy
- United Nations Mission in Haiti
