= United Nations Security Council Resolution 1086 =

UN Security Council Resolution 1086
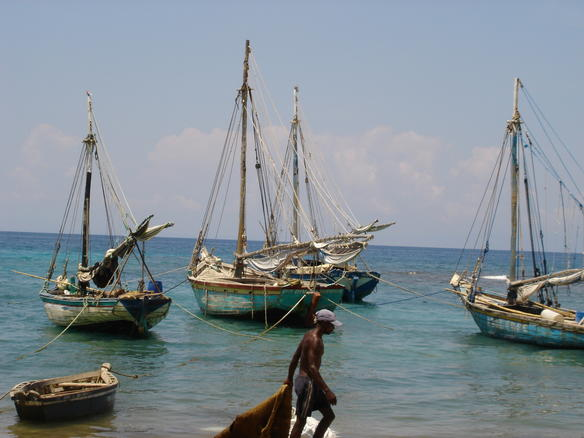
- Haitian fishing boats
- Date: 5 December 1996
- Meeting no.: 3,721
- Code: S/RES/1086 (Document)
- Subject: The question concerning Haiti
- Voting summary: 15 voted for; None voted against; None abstained
- Result: Adopted

Security Council composition
- Permanent members: China; France; Russia; United Kingdom; United States
- Non-permanent members: Botswana; Chile; Egypt; Guinea-Bissau; Germany; Honduras; Indonesia; Italy; South Korea; Poland

United Nations Security Council resolution 1086, adopted unanimously on 29 November 1996, after recalling all relevant Security Council and General Assembly resolutions on Haiti, the Council decided to extend the United Nations Support Mission in Haiti (UNSMIH) for a final time, until 31 May 1997, unless it could make further progress, in which case, it would be extended until 31 July 1997.

The security council noted the improvement in the security situation in Haiti within recent months and the capacity of the Haitian National Police in confronting it. There were still fluctuations in the security situation. The work of the National Police was commended in promoting democracy the revitalisation of the country's justice system, while efforts by the Organization of American States (OAS) and International Civilian Mission (MICIVIH) were also welcomed.

The importance of a self-sustaining and fully functioning police force was stressed. The mandate of UNSMIH, as set out in Resolution 1063 (1996), was extended until 31 May 1997 with 300 police and 500 military personnel unless UNSMIH could make further progress with the police force, in which case it would be extended until 31 July 1997 following a review by the council.

The Secretary-General Boutros Boutros-Ghali was requested to report back by 31 March 1997 on the implementation of the resolution. It was recognised that reconstruction and economic rehabilitation were major tasks facing the Government of Haiti and the importance of international assistance to the country. International assistance was urged from Member States in addition to contributions to the voluntary fund established in Resolution 975 (1995).

== See also ==
- History of Haiti
- List of United Nations Security Council Resolutions 1001 to 1100 (1995–1997)
- Operation Uphold Democracy
- United Nations Mission in Haiti
