= United Nations Security Council Resolution 933 =

UN Security Council Resolution 933
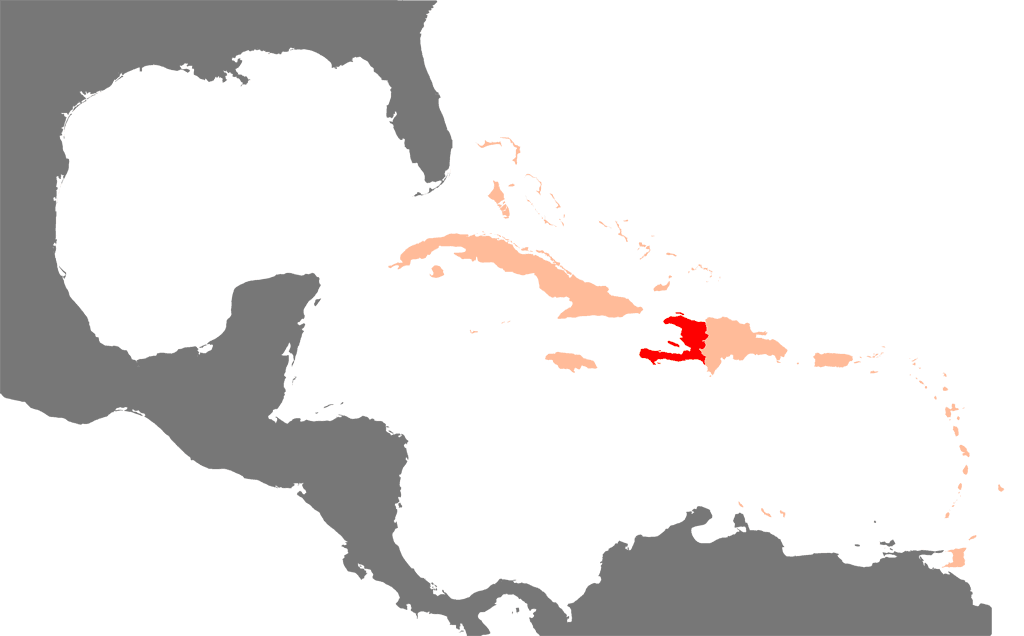
- Haiti (dark red) within the Caribbean
- Date: 30 June 1994
- Meeting no.: 3,397
- Code: S/RES/933 (Document)
- Subject: The situation in Haiti
- Voting summary: 15 voted for; None voted against; None abstained
- Result: Adopted

Security Council composition
- Permanent members: China; France; Russia; United Kingdom; United States
- Non-permanent members: Argentina; Brazil; Czech Republic; Djibouti; New Zealand; Nigeria; Oman; Pakistan; Rwanda; Spain

United Nations Security Council resolution 933, adopted unanimously on 30 June 1994, after recalling resolutions 841 (1993), 861 (1993), 862 (1993), 867 (1993), 873 (1993), 875 (1993), 905 (1994) and 917 (1994), the Council noted the deteriorating situation in Haiti and extended the mandate of the United Nations Mission in Haiti (UNMIH) until 31 July 1994.

The council was deeply concerned that the UNMIH mission's deployment was still being obstructed and the failure of the Haitian army to carry out its responsibilities to allow it to function. It was noted that the Organization of American States had adopted a resolution requesting the mandate of UNMIH to be strengthened. It was important that the mission was deployed as soon as possible.

The recent escalation of violence, violations of international humanitarian law and the appointment of the so-called de facto government-III were condemned. Concern was expressed at the deteriorating humanitarian situation in Haiti and the international community was urged to assist in this regard.

The Council regretted the Haitian military authorities refusal to implement the Governors Island peace agreement, and extended the mandate of UNAVEM II until 31 July 1994. The Secretary-General Boutros Boutros-Ghali was requested to report back to the Security Council by 15 July with recommendations on the strength, composition, cost and duration of UNMIH, also detailing the assistance that the mission could provide to help restore the democratic government of Haiti and issues relating to security, law enforcement and elections.

Member States were requested to provide troops, police, personnel, equipment and logistical support. The situation in Haiti would be kept under review and any recommendations in the light of new developments would be considered.

== See also ==
- History of Haiti
- List of United Nations Security Council Resolutions 901 to 1000 (1994–1995)
