= David Meade (disambiguation) =

David Meade may refer to:

- David Meade (author), American end-times conspiracy theorist and book author
- David Meade (politician) (born 1976), American Republican party politician
- David C. Meade (1940–2019), U.S. Army major general
