= Joint Mission Analysis Centre =

United Nations multidisciplinary organization

- Formation: 2005
- Founder: UN Security Council
- Type: Intelligence-gathering and analysis
- Purpose: Assist the UN peacekeeping missions with intelligence and strategic and operational analysis
- Headquarters: UN local peacekeeping missions
- Region served: Global

The Joint Mission Analysis Centre (JMAC) is a United Nations multidisciplinary structure created in 2005, whose mandate is to provide integrated analyses for the senior management of peacekeeping missions, or in other words provide the UN with an intelligence-collection capability at strategic or operational levels.

The Joint Mission Analysis Centre collects information from across UN missions and produces analysis to support the activities of the latter. Civil affairs reporting and analysis is a vital source of information from a local level, and is utilised to refine the analysis conducted by JMAC, by corroborating it against information on the ground. Although the organisational structure of each JMAC varies for each mission, it usually counts with analysts that interpret information gathered by civil affair officers.

== History ==
The JMAC was created in 2005, at the behest of the UN Security Council, as a unit of military officers, police and international civilians.

In 2006, the Department of Peacekeeping Operations adopted a policy that a JMAC, as well as a Joint Operations Centre should be established in all peacekeeping operations to the aforementioned tasks, using military, police and civilian personnel.

The United Nations Mission in Haiti (MINUSTAH) was one of the first intelligence-led operations in the twenty-first century. During the mission, the peacekeeping operation succeeded in gaining superiority over local gangs who controlled considerably large sections of various Haitian cities, including the capital. MINUSTAH, through its JMAC, as well as its other intelligence branches, used local informants (assets) to ascertain the locations and activities of these gang leaders.

As part of MINUSTAH, the Haiti JMAC prepared the relevant intelligence for the peacekeeping corps to take measures against the gangs. The UN thus successfully secured the country from gang rule. During Operation Jauru Sudamericana, for example, JMAC was in contact with sources who were tasked to mark gang targets for UN forces. This information proved vital for the UN command to prevent further escalation of clashes between Haitian residents provoked by the gangs and the UN mission during demonstrations.

Since then, the JMAC structure and modus operandi has extended to other sites, including Sudan and the DRC, where it acquired SIGINT capabilities.
