= United Nations Security Council Resolution 1123 =

UN Security Council Resolution 1123
- Haiti medal bar
- Date: 30 July 1997
- Meeting no.: 3,806
- Code: S/RES/1123 (Document)
- Subject: The question concerning Haiti
- Voting summary: 15 voted for; None voted against; None abstained
- Result: Adopted

Security Council composition
- Permanent members: China; France; Russia; United Kingdom; United States
- Non-permanent members: Chile; Costa Rica; Egypt; Guinea-Bissau; Japan; Kenya; South Korea; Poland; Portugal; Sweden

United Nations Security Council resolution 1123, adopted unanimously on 30 July 1997, after recalling all relevant Security Council and General Assembly resolutions on Haiti and noting the termination of the United Nations Support Mission in Haiti in accordance with Resolution 1086 (1996), the council established the United Nations Transition Mission in Haiti (UNTMIH) to assist with the national police force.

The security council noted the role that the United Nations had played in the establishment of the Haitian National Police. It also emphasised the importance of a professional, fully functioning national police force and the revitalisation of Haiti's justice system. At the request of the President of Haiti René Préval, UNTMIH was established for a single four-month period ending on 30 November 1997 in order to assist in the professionalisation of the Haitian police. UNTMIH would consist of 250 civilian police and 50 military personnel.

Finally, the Secretary-General Kofi Annan was requested to report on the implementation of the current resolution and future international aid to Haiti by 30 September 1997.

== See also ==
- History of Haiti
- List of United Nations Security Council Resolutions 1101 to 1200 (1997–1998)
- Operation Uphold Democracy
- United Nations Mission in Haiti
