= General Meade (disambiguation) =

George Meade (1815–1872) was a U.S. Army major general. General Meade may also refer to:

- David C. Meade (1940–2019), U.S. Army major general
- Henry J. Meade (1925–2006), U.S. Air Force major general
- John Meade (British Army officer) (c. 1775–1849), British Army lieutenant general
- Richard John Meade (1821–1894), British Indian Army general

== See also ==
- Owen Mead (1892–1942), New Zealand Military Forces major general
