= United Nations Security Council Resolution 917 =

UN Security Council Resolution 917
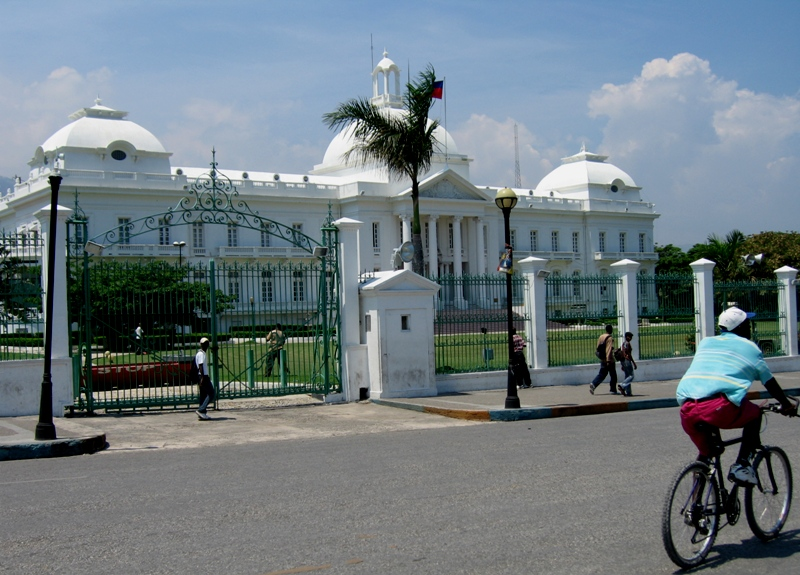
- Haiti Presidential Palace
- Date: 6 May 1994
- Meeting no.: 3,376
- Code: S/RES/917 (Document)
- Subject: The situation in Haiti
- Voting summary: 15 voted for; None voted against; None abstained
- Result: Adopted

Security Council composition
- Permanent members: China; France; Russia; United Kingdom; United States
- Non-permanent members: Argentina; Brazil; Czech Republic; Djibouti; New Zealand; Nigeria; Oman; Pakistan; Rwanda; Spain

United Nations Security Council resolution 917, adopted unanimously on 6 May 1994, after recalling resolutions 841 (1993), 861 (1993), 862 (1993), 867 (1993), 873 (1993) and 875 (1993) and 905 (1994) on the situation in Haiti, the Council imposed further international sanctions on the country after the military authorities refused to implement the Governors Island Agreement to hand over power and instances of violations of human rights.

The security council confirmed the intention of the international community to restore democracy in Haiti and the return of President Jean-Bertrand Aristide. The need for free and fair elections, as called for in the constitution, was stressed. Killings, illegal detentions, abductions, disappearances, instances of rape, the denial of freedom of expression and the impunity under which armed citizens operated were all condemned. The Council recalled that further measures would be considered if the Haitian authorities continued to impede the activities of the United Nations Mission in Haiti (UNMIH) and failed to implement the Governors Island Agreement.

== Sanctions ==
Acting under Chapter VII of the United Nations Charter, the parties were called upon to co-operate with the United Nations and the Organization of American States (OAS) to implement the agreement. All countries were told immediately to prohibit any aircraft to take off from, land in, or overfly their territory if it was destined to land in, or had taken off from Haiti, excluding humanitarian reasons. They were also called upon to deny entry to:

(a) Haitian military and police officers and their immediate families;
(b) those involved in the coup d'état in 1991 and subsequent illegal government and their immediate families;
(c) employees of the Haitian military and their immediate families.

In all, the ban affected around 600 officers. Funds were also ordered to be frozen, and measures outlined below, consistent with the embargo recommended by the OAS, were to take effect no later than 23:59 EST. All countries were:

(a) prohibited from receiving imports or exporting to Haiti;
(b) to ban activities by nationals in their territories which would promote exports to Haiti.

Additionally, all exports were banned to Haiti, excluding:

(a) medical and food supplies;
(b) other products essential for humanitarian use, permitted by the Committee;
(c) petroleum or petroleum products, including cooking gas;
(d) products authorised in Resolution 873.

It was decided that the above prohibitions would not apply to information materials, including books and materials for journalists. All traffic to and from Haiti carrying prohibited goods was banned, except for regular shipping lines carrying approved goods. French, American, Canadian and Venezuelan boats patrolled the Haitian coast to ensure the application of the embargo.

All countries were requested to report to the Secretary-General Boutros Boutros-Ghali by 6 June 1994 on the measures they had taken to implement the present resolution. The committee established in Resolution 841 was entrusted with additional functions including:

(a) to examine reports submitted by Member States;
(b) to obtain further information on action taken by countries;
(c) to consider information concerning violations of the measures;
(d) to make recommendations based on the violations;
(e) to consider any applications for approval regarding flights;
(f) to amend guidelines in Resolution 841 to take account of measures in the current resolution;
(g) to examine possible requests under Article 50 of the United Nations Charter for any states affected by the sanctions against Haiti.

The measures would be reviewed monthly a democratic government returned to Haiti and would be suspended if progress had been made, but would not be lifted until:

(a) the resignation or departure from Haiti of the Commander-in-Chief of the Haitian Armed Forces, the Chief of Police of Port-au-Prince, and the Chief of Staff of the Haitian Armed Forces;
(b) changes in the leadership of the police and military high command;
(c) the creation of an environment where free and fair elections could be held;
(d) the creation of conditions where UNMIH could be deployed;
(e) the return of President Aristide.

The resolution concluded by condemning any illegal attempt to remove legal authority from the legitimately elected president, declaring that it would consider any move illegitimate and would therefore warrant the reimposition of the above measures.

== See also ==
- History of Haiti
- List of United Nations Security Council Resolutions 901 to 1000 (1994–1995)
