= United Nations Security Council Resolution 1063 =

UN Security Council Resolution 1063
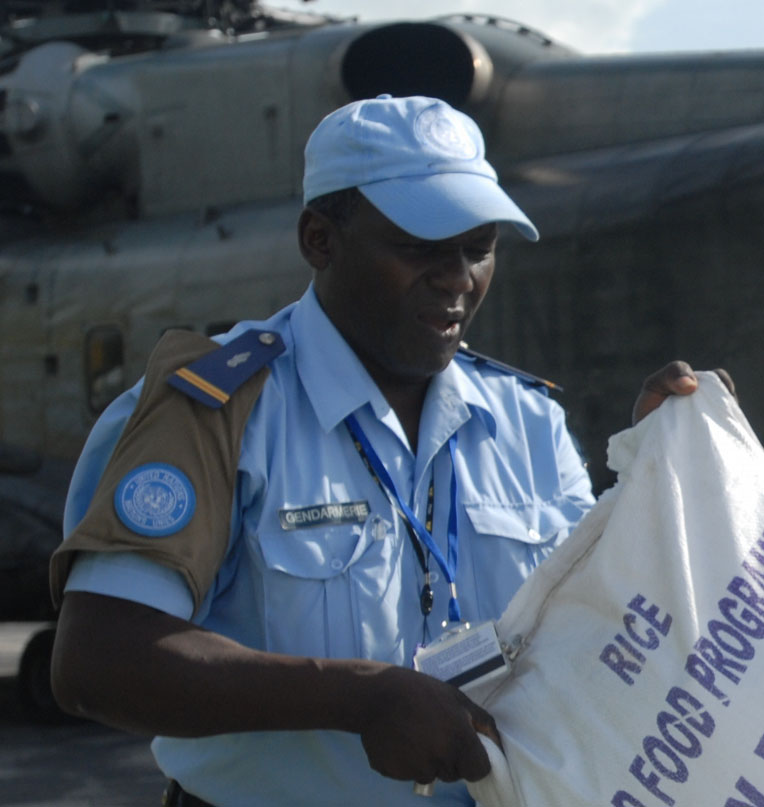
- Haitian police assisting in humanitarian operations
- Date: 28 June 1996
- Meeting no.: 3,676
- Code: S/RES/1063 (Document)
- Subject: The question concerning Haiti
- Voting summary: 15 voted for; None voted against; None abstained
- Result: Adopted

Security Council composition
- Permanent members: China; France; Russia; United Kingdom; United States
- Non-permanent members: Botswana; Chile; Egypt; Guinea-Bissau; Germany; Honduras; Indonesia; Italy; South Korea; Poland

United Nations Security Council resolution 1063, adopted unanimously on 28 June 1996, after recalling all Security Council and General Assembly resolutions on Haiti and the termination of the United Nations Mission in Haiti (UNMIH) on 30 June 1996 in accordance with Resolution 1048 (1996), the Council decided to establish the United Nations Support Mission in Haiti (UNSMIH) to train a national police force and maintain a stable environment.

The Security Council affirmed the importance of a fully operational professional Haitian police force and the revitalisation of the legal system. In this regard, UNSMIH was established to maintain a stable environment and assist in the training of a new police force, initially until 30 November 1996. The mission would initially consist of 300 policemen and 600 troops. Haiti also had to quickly receive additional financial support from international institutions for the reconstruction of the country.

Finally, the Secretary-General Boutros Boutros-Ghali requested by 30 September 1996 to report on the implementation of the current resolution and to seek further opportunities to reduce the operational costs of UNSMIH.

== See also ==
- History of Haiti
- List of United Nations Security Council Resolutions 1001 to 1100 (1995–1997)
- Operation Uphold Democracy
