= David C. Meade =

American Army general (1940–2019)

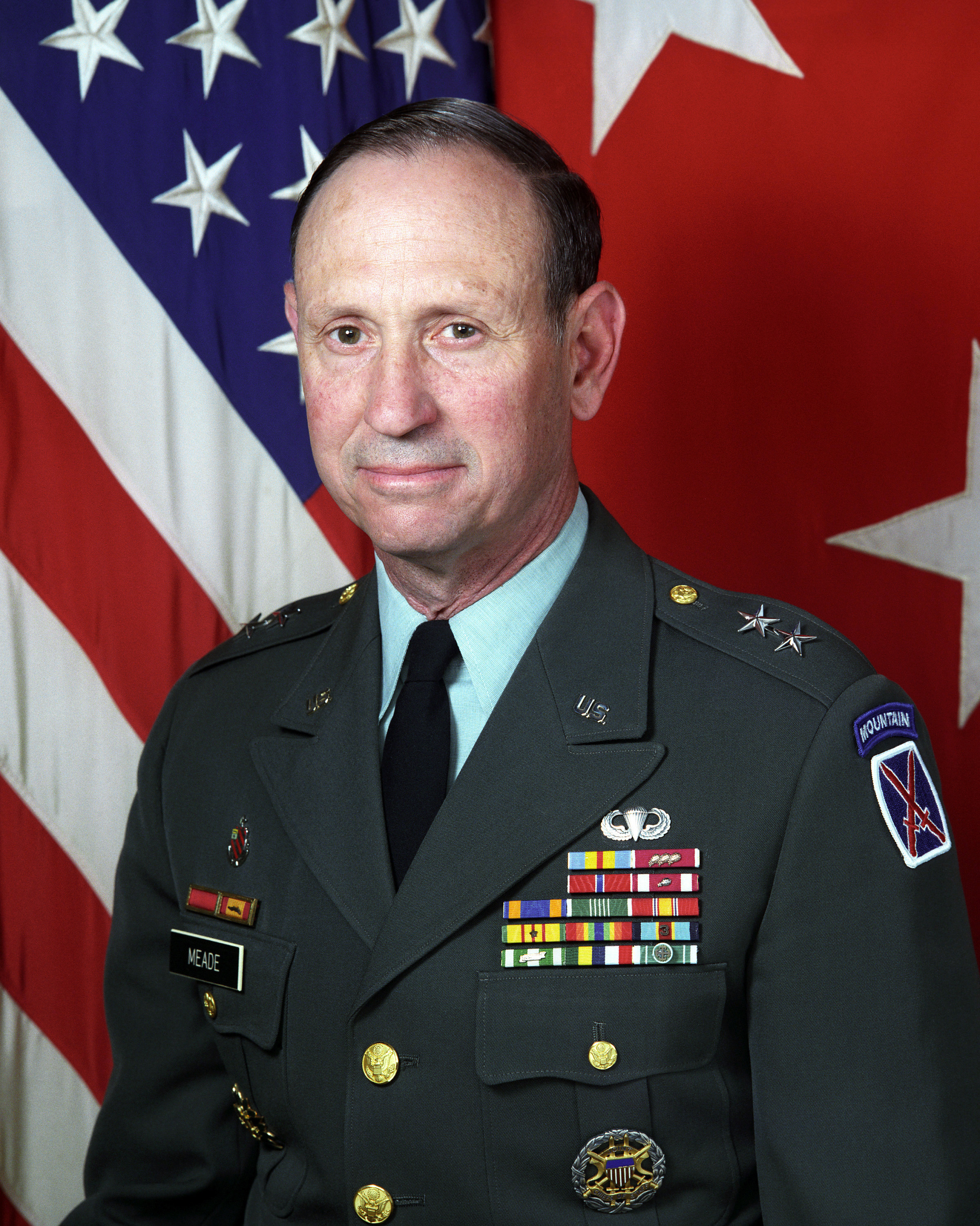
- Born: 21 August 1940; Washington, D.C., US
- Died: 9 October 2019 (aged 79); Dover, New Hampshire, US
- Military career
- Allegiance: United States
- Branch: United States Army
- Service years: 1962–1995
- Rank: Major General
- Commands: 10th Mountain Division; 7th Infantry Division Artillery; 1st Battalion, 79th Field Artillery Regiment
- Conflicts: Vietnam War; Operation Uphold Democracy
- Awards: Defense Distinguished Service Medal; Army Distinguished Service Medal; Legion of Merit (4); Bronze Star Medal; Meritorious Service Medal (2); Air Medal; Order of Military Merit

David Custis Meade (21 August 1940 – 9 October 2019) was a major general in the United States Army who served as commanding officer of the 10th Mountain Division from August 1993 to July 1995. As division commander, he also served as commander of Multinational Forces Haiti from October 1994 to January 1995.

== Early life and education ==
Born in Washington, D.C. and raised in Bethesda, Maryland, Meade graduated from Bethesda-Chevy Chase Senior High School in 1958. He then attended Dickinson College, where he was a member of Beta Theta Pi, played lacrosse and earned an A.B. degree in 1962. Meade participated in the Army ROTC program at Dickinson College and was commissioned a second lieutenant of artillery upon graduation. He later received a master's degree in education from the University of Virginia.

== Military career ==
During his career, Meade was deployed to Vietnam, Somalia, Haiti, Grenada and Panama.

As a lieutenant colonel, Meade served as commander of the 1st Battalion, 79th Field Artillery Regiment. As a colonel, he was given command of the 7th Infantry Division Artillery.

As a major general, Meade supervised the deployment of 10th Mountain Division troops to Haiti in 1994 during Operation Uphold Democracy. He was one of the first American soldiers on the ground in Haiti when the operation began on 19 September 1994.

In May 1995, Meade was conferred an honorary Doctor of Liberal Arts degree by his alma mater Dickinson College. He retired from active duty later in 1995.

== Awards and decorations ==
Meade's military awards included:

Defense Distinguished Service Medal
Army Distinguished Service Medal
Legion of Merit
Bronze Star
Meritorious Service Medal
Air Medal
Order of Military Merit (Commander, 1992; Brazil)

== Personal ==
Meade was married to Frances Meade. They had a daughter and two sons. After his first marriage ended in divorce, he remarried with Marina (Kalergis) Meade.

After his death in Dover, New Hampshire, Meade was interred at Arlington National Cemetery on 28 July 2020.
