= United Nations Security Council Resolution 905 =

UN Security Council Resolution 905
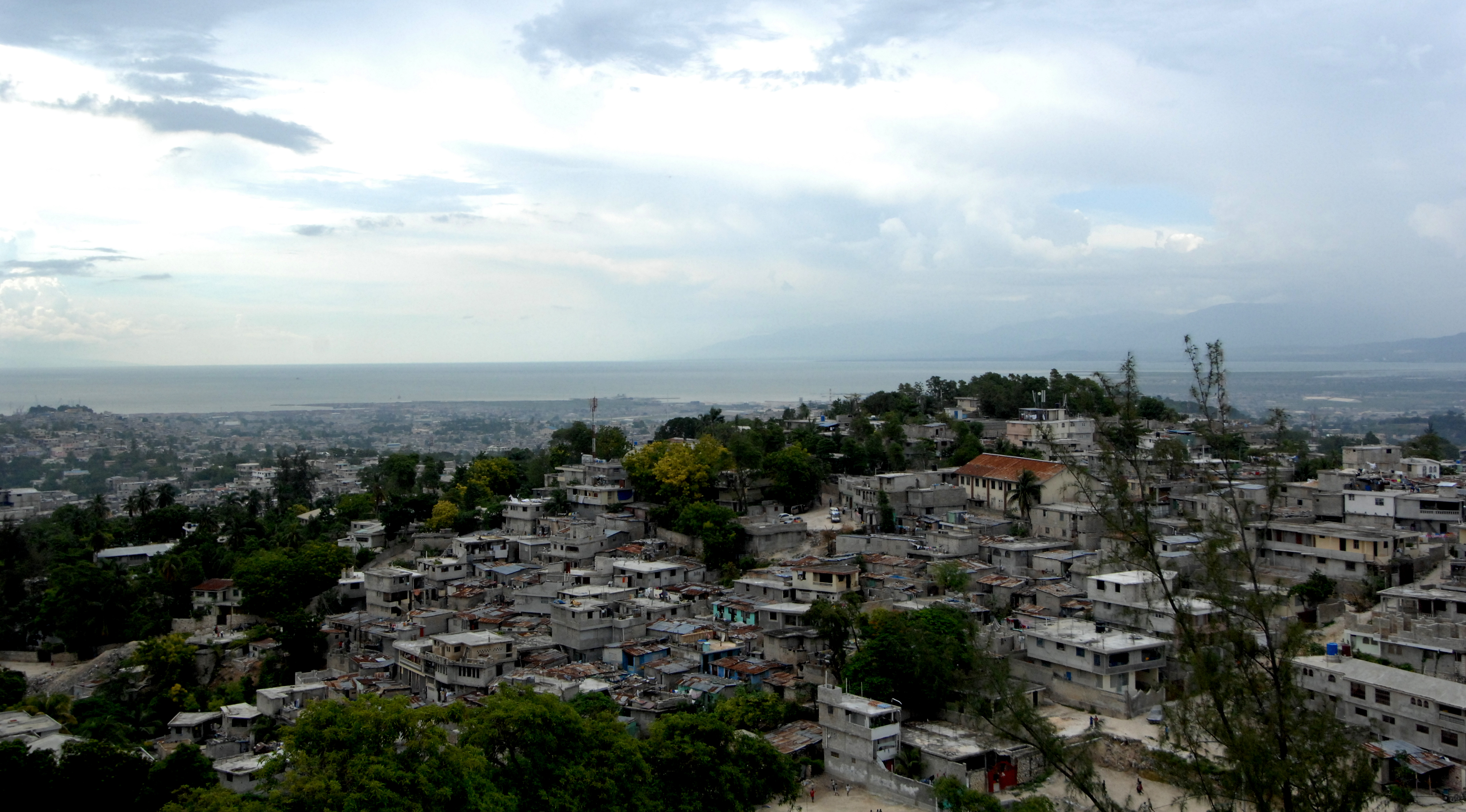
- Haitian capital Port-au-Prince
- Date: 23 March 1994
- Meeting no.: 3,352
- Code: S/RES/905 (Document)
- Subject: Haiti
- Voting summary: 15 voted for; None voted against; None abstained
- Result: Adopted

Security Council composition
- Permanent members: China; France; Russia; United Kingdom; United States
- Non-permanent members: Argentina; Brazil; Czech Republic; Djibouti; New Zealand; Nigeria; Oman; Pakistan; Rwanda; Spain

United Nations Security Council resolution 905, adopted unanimously on 23 March 1994, after recalling resolutions 841 (1993), 861 (1993), 862 (1993), 867 (1993), 873 (1993) and 875 (1993), on the situation in Haiti, the council extended the mandate of the United Nations Mission in Haiti (UNMIH) until 30 June 1994.

The council was disturbed by the obstruction to the dispatch of UNMIH and the failure of the Armed Forces of Haiti to carry out their responsibilities to allow UNMIH to carry out its work. The importance of the Governors Island Agreement of 3 July 1993 between the President of Haiti and the Commander in Chief of the Armed Forces of Haiti was stressed, which promoted the return of peace and stability to the country.

Finally, the Secretary-General Boutros Boutros-Ghali was requested to report to the council making specific recommendations with regard to UNMIH's composition and scope of its activities.

== See also ==
- History of Haiti
- List of United Nations Security Council Resolutions 901 to 1000 (1994–1995)
