= International Civilian Mission in Haiti =

1993 United Nations mission in Haiti

The International Civilian Mission in Haiti (MICIVIH, from the French: Mission civile internationale en Haïti) was a joint civilian mission in Haiti by the United Nations and the Organization of American States. It was created in February 1993, with a mandate focussed on protection of human rights and legitimate state institutions. MICIVIH was the response to a request from deposed president Jean-Bertrand Aristide. Most of the mission staff was evacuated in October 1993, and the mission was suspended for multiple months in 1994. It then continued until its mandate expired in 2000.

It was the United Nations first joint mission with a regional organization: in this case, the Organization of American States (OAS).

== MICIVIH achievements at the national level ==
MICIVIH assisted in persuading to stop the military junta commanded by Gen. Raoul Cédras, and therefore, put a halt in the violations of human rights inflicted by the military. The mission assisted in the dismantling of the old military system and in the creation of a new police force, trained and aware of the respect for human rights. It propitiated a more civilized environment, in the political and social aspects. A requirement to achieve future economic development desperately needed in this impoverished country.

== MICIVIH achievements at the international level ==
The mission encouraged the expansion of human right presences and the creation of new offices of human rights, in countries similarly affected by the violation of human rights. It also contributed to the opening of the office for the United Nations High Commissioner for Human Rights, the bureau that oversees all activities of the UN system related to human rights.

== Personnel ==
The executive director from 1993 to 2000 was Colin Granderson; the deputy executive director from 1996 to 2000 was Rodolfo Mattarollo.
