= United Nations Security Council Resolution 875 =

UN Security Council Resolution 875
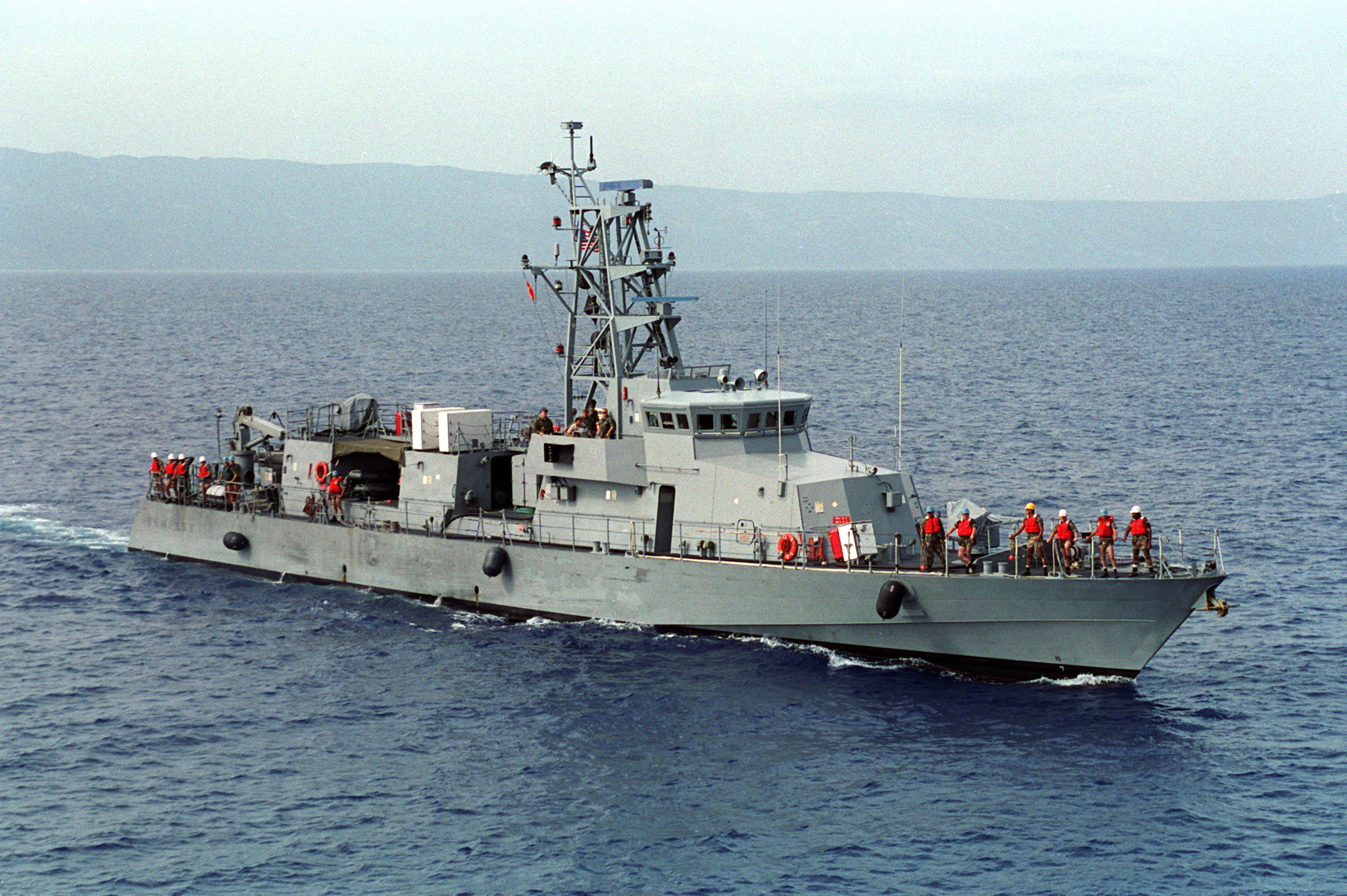
- USS Tempest (PC-2) patrolling as part of maritime embargo against Haiti
- Date: 16 October 1993
- Meeting no.: 3,293
- Code: S/RES/875 (Document)
- Subject: Haiti
- Voting summary: 15 voted for; None voted against; None abstained
- Result: Adopted

Security Council composition
- Permanent members: China; France; Russia; United Kingdom; United States
- Non-permanent members: Brazil; Cape Verde; Djibouti; Hungary; Japan; Morocco; New Zealand; Pakistan; Spain; Venezuela

United Nations Security Council resolution 875, adopted unanimously on 16 October 1993, after recalling resolutions 841 (1993), 861 (1993), 862 (1993), 867 (1993) and 873 (1993), the council, aware of the continued failure of parties in Haiti implement the Governors Island Agreement, widened international sanctions and imposed a naval blockade against the country.

The sanctions were a further measure aimed at removing the military junta in Haiti and restoring democracy. Acting under Chapter VII and Chapter VIII of the United Nations Charter, the Council called upon member states to halt inward maritime shipping as necessary in order to inspect and verify their cargoes and destinations, as well as implement restrictions on petroleum and liquefied natural gas in accordance with previous resolutions.

The resolution concluded by stating that further measures would be taken if necessary to ensure compliance.

== See also ==
- History of Haiti
- List of United Nations Security Council Resolutions 801 to 900 (1993–1994)
