= United Nations Security Council Resolution 873 =

UN Security Council Resolution 873
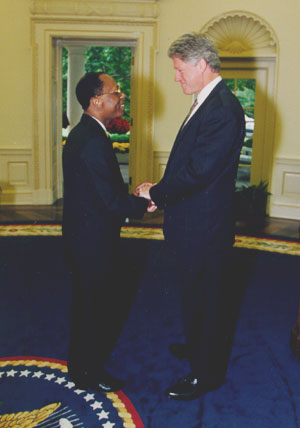
- United States President Bill Clinton and Haitian President Jean-Bertrand Aristide (1994)
- Date: 13 October 1993
- Meeting no.: 3,291
- Code: S/RES/873 (Document)
- Subject: Haiti
- Voting summary: 15 voted for; None voted against; None abstained
- Result: Adopted

Security Council composition
- Permanent members: China; France; Russia; United Kingdom; United States
- Non-permanent members: Brazil; Cape Verde; Djibouti; Hungary; Japan; Morocco; New Zealand; Pakistan; Spain; Venezuela

United Nations Security Council resolution 873, adopted unanimously on 13 October 1993, after recalling resolutions 841 (1993), 861 (1993), 862 (1993) and 867 (1993), the council noted the continued obstruction of the arrival of the United Nations Mission in Haiti (UNMIH) and the failure of the Armed Forces of Haiti to carry out their responsibilities and therefore reimposed international sanctions against Haiti that were previously suspended.

The decision was taken under Chapter VII of the United Nations Charter, after the council learned of the failure of the military and police in not complying with the Governors Island Agreement and determined it to be a threat to international peace and security. The termination would come into effect at 23:59 Eastern Standard Time on 18 October 1993 unless the council heard that the parties were implementing the agreements. Funds that were frozen could be released at the request of President Jean-Bertrand Aristide or Prime Minister Robert Malval, and that the committee established in Resolution 841 would have the authority to grant exceptions to the prohibitions on a case-by-case basis.

The resolution expressed the council's readiness to consider further measures if authorities and others in Haiti continue to impede UNMIH and its rights to freedom of movement and communication or others necessary to carry out its mandate.

== See also ==
- History of Haiti
- List of United Nations Security Council Resolutions 801 to 900 (1993–1994)
