= United Nations Security Council Resolution 862 =

United Nations Security Council resolution

UN Security Council Resolution 862
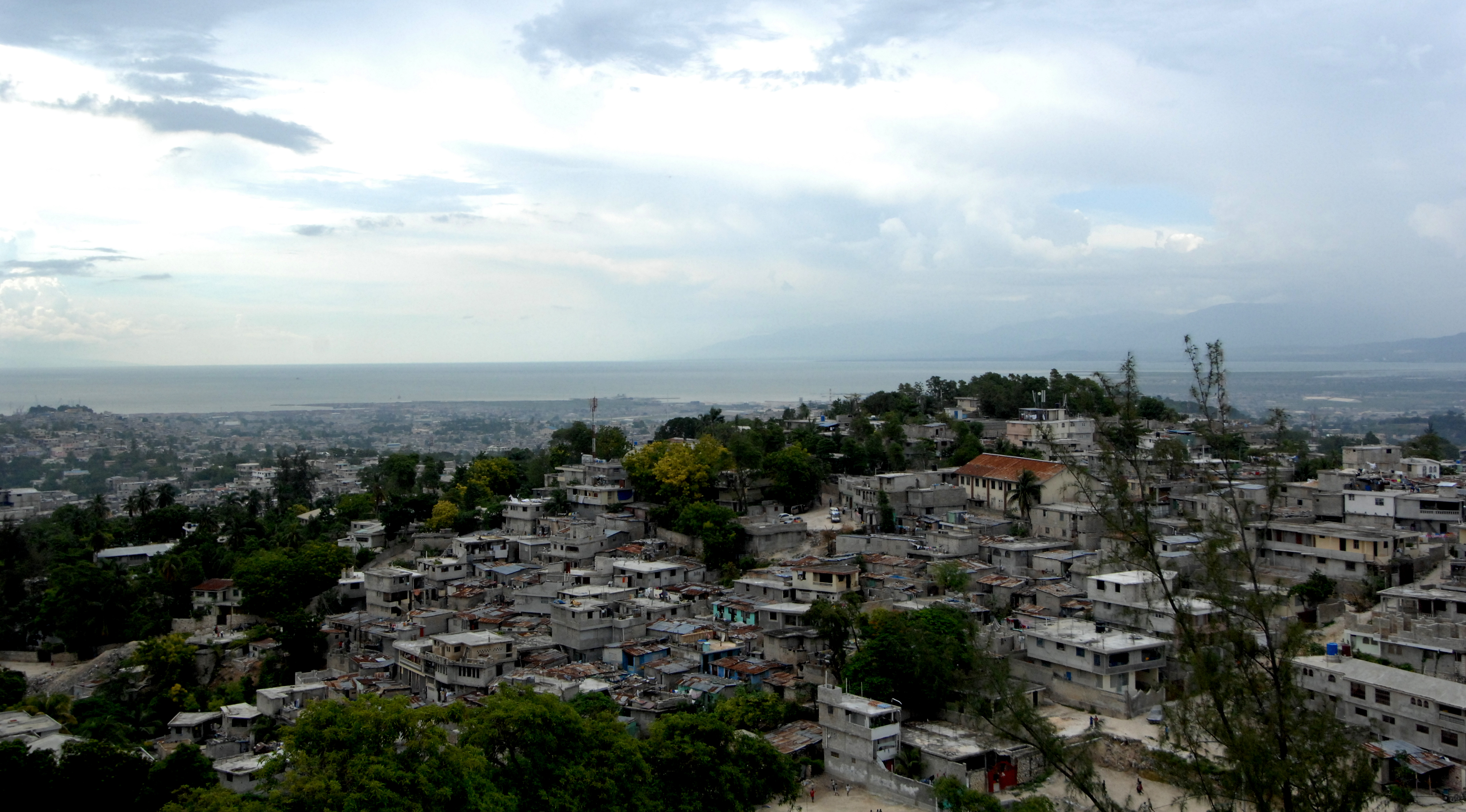
- Haitian capital Port-au-Prince
- Date: 31 August 1993
- Meeting no.: 3,272
- Code: S/RES/862 (Document)
- Subject: Haiti
- Voting summary: 15 voted for; None voted against; None abstained
- Result: Adopted

Security Council composition
- Permanent members: China; France; Russia; United Kingdom; United States
- Non-permanent members: Brazil; Cape Verde; Djibouti; Hungary; Japan; Morocco; New Zealand; Pakistan; Spain; Venezuela

United Nations Security Council resolution 862, adopted unanimously on 31 August 1993, after recalling resolutions 841 (1993), 861 (1993) and an agreement between the President of Haiti and the Commander-in-Chief of the Armed Forces of Haiti, the Council reaffirmed the international community's commitment to a solution in Haiti and discussed the establishment of a new police force in Haiti under a proposed United Nations Mission in Haiti (UNMIH).

The immediate dispatch of an advance team of no more than 30 personnel to assess requirements and prepare for the possible dispatch of both the civilian police and military assistance components of UNMIH. The mandate of the advance team would last for one month with the prospect of incorporating it into the UNMIH peacekeeping mission when established.

The Council awaited a further report by the Secretary-General Boutros Boutros-Ghali concerning the proposed establishment of UNMIH and its financial costs, time-frame, projected conclusion and co-ordination with the work of the Organization of American States, further requesting him to enter into a Status of Forces Agreement with the Government of Haiti to facilitate an early dispatch of UNMIH when the Council decided. The mission was formally established in Resolution 867.

== See also ==
- History of Haiti
- List of United Nations Security Council Resolutions 801 to 900 (1993–1994)
