= United Nations Security Council Resolution 867 =

UN Security Council Resolution 867
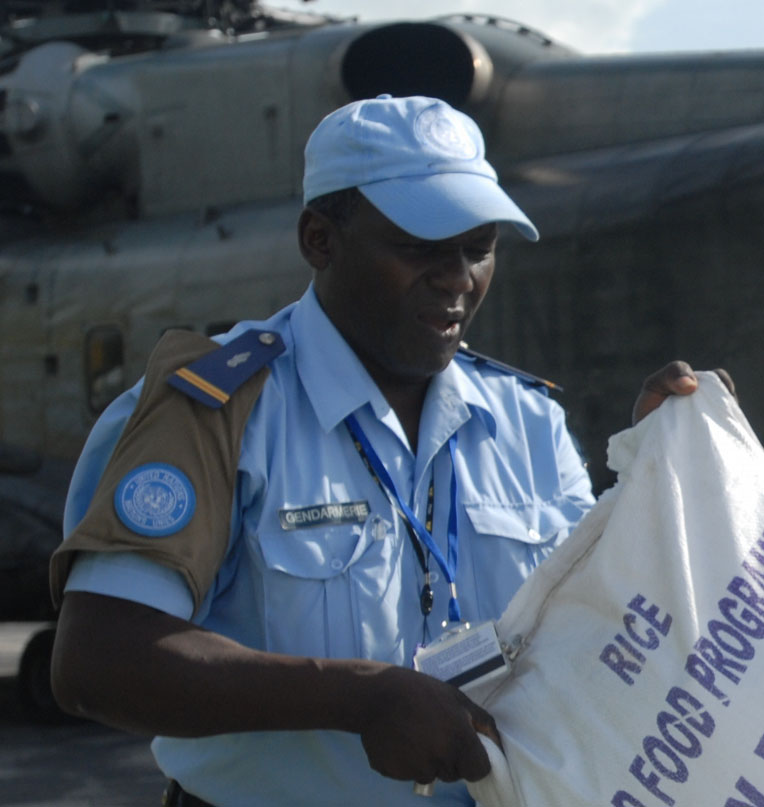
- Haitian police with United Nations brassard
- Date: 23 September 1993
- Meeting no.: 3,282
- Code: S/RES/867 (Document)
- Subject: Haiti
- Voting summary: 15 voted for; None voted against; None abstained
- Result: Adopted

Security Council composition
- Permanent members: China; France; Russia; United Kingdom; United States
- Non-permanent members: Brazil; Cape Verde; Djibouti; Hungary; Japan; Morocco; New Zealand; Pakistan; Spain; Venezuela

United Nations Security Council resolution 867, adopted unanimously on 23 September 1993, after recalling resolutions 841 (1993), 861 (1993) and 862 (1993) on the situation in Haiti, the council reiterated its position of protecting international peace and stability and established the United Nations Mission in Haiti (UNMIH).

The council received a proposal from the Government of Haiti concerning the creation of a new police force and in modernising the Haitian armed forces. On 3 July 1993, the President of Haiti and the commander of the army of the country signed an agreement to return the country to peace and stability, and which addressed the issues of the police and military. In this respect, the council supported the efforts to implement that agreement.

Acting on a recommendation by the Secretary-General Boutros Boutros-Ghali, the council authorised the establishment of UNMIH for an initial period of six months, subject to the proviso that it would be extended beyond the seventy-five days upon a review by the council on whether progress had been made. The mission itself would consist of up to 567 police and 700 military observers, including 60 military instructors. The observers will accompany the Haitian police and train and observe their operations, while the soldiers were responsible for the modernisation of the army and following roles:

(a) providing non-combat training;
(b) the military construction unit would work with the Haitian military to implement projects from the secretary-general's report such as military barracks and infrastructure.

The intention of the secretary-general to place the mission under the oversight of his special representative and the Organization of American States (OAS), which also oversaw the International Civilian Mission, was welcomed. Haiti was asked to provide security and freedom of movement to United Nations personnel, urging the conclusion of a Status of Mission agreement. At the same time, the groups in the country were called upon to renounce violence.

The secretary-general was requested to seek financing of the mission by way of a trust fund and contributions from Member States for the police and military components of UNMIH. Resolution 867 concluded by further asking him to report back by 10 December 1993 and 25 January 1994 on developments in Haiti.

== See also ==
- History of Haiti
- List of United Nations Security Council Resolutions 801 to 900 (1993–1994)
