= Operation Uphold Democracy =

International military intervention in Haiti following the 1991 coup d'etat

- Part of the Post–Cold War era
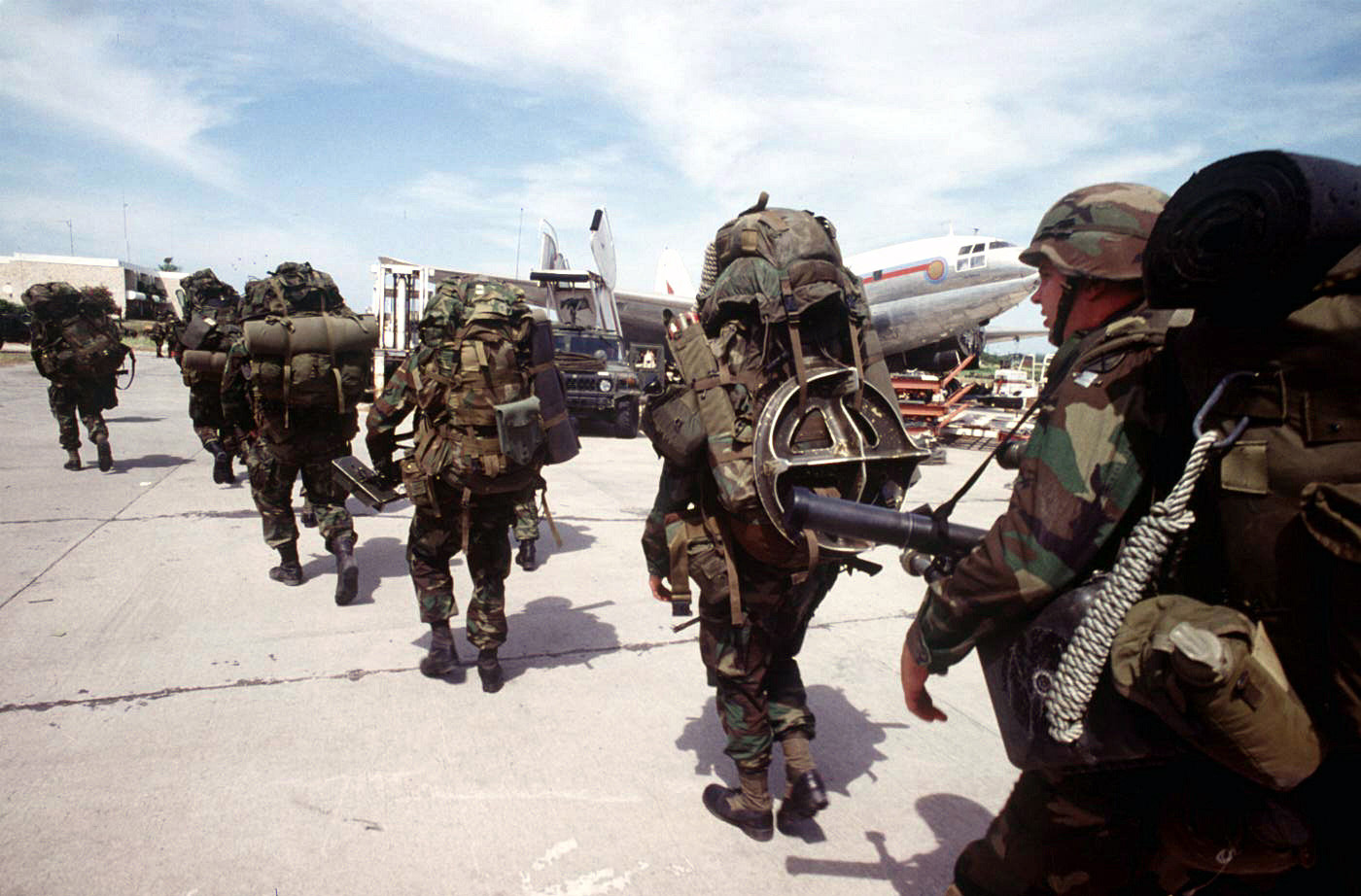
- Soldiers of C Company, 2nd Battalion 22nd Infantry, 10th Mountain Division securing Port-au-Prince Airport on the first day of Operation Uphold Democracy.
Date	19 September 1994 – 31 March 1995 (6 months, 1 week and 5 days)
Location	Haiti
Result	US-led coalition victory: Military regime removed, Raoul Cédras deposed; Jean-Bertrand Aristide sworn back into office.

Belligerents
United States; Argentina; Bangladesh; Belgium; Guatemala; Netherlands; Poland CARICOM: Antigua and Barbuda; Bahamas; Barbados; Belize; Guyana; Jamaica; Trinidad and Tobago; Haitian opposition	Haiti

Commanders and leaders
Bill Clinton; Hugh Shelton; George A. Fisher Jr.; Sławomir Petelicki; Enrique Molina Pico; Abdur Rahman Biswas; Jean-Luc Dehaene; Ramiro de León Carpio; Wim Kok; Jean-Bertrand Aristide	Raoul Cédras; Michel François; Émile Jonassaint; Robert Malval

Strength
(United States) 25,000 troops, 2 aircraft carriers (Argentina) 3 corvettes (Bangladesh) 1,050 troops (Belgium) 34 police officers (Guatemala) 134 troops (Netherlands) 1 frigate, 1 aircraft, 15 police officers (Poland) 51 special forces operators (Caribbean Community) 295 troops	3,000 troops

Casualties and losses
1 killed, 1 wounded	10 killed

Operation Uphold Democracy was a multinational military intervention in Haiti designed to remove the military regime led and installed by Raoul Cédras after the 1991 coup d'état overthrew the elected President Jean-Bertrand Aristide. The operation was effectively authorized by the 31 July 1994 United Nations Security Council Resolution 940, which approved the use of force to restore the Aristide government.

After Jean-Bertrand Aristide became Haiti's first freely-elected president in 1990 and was overthrown in 1991, the United States, in cooperation with the Organization of American States, imposed economic sanctions to pressure the military junta to restore democracy. Negotiations brokered by the UN and the OAS in 1993 led to some progress towards this but were ultimately unsuccessful. After that the U.S. followed a dual strategy of preparing for an intervention while hoping it would pressure the regime to give up power. It also sought diplomatic support at the UN, which led to Resolution 940—the first time that the UN authorized the use of force to restore democracy.

Military preparations for Operation Uphold Democracy were completed in September 1994, with 25,000 troops and two aircraft carriers from the U.S. Armed Forces assigned to the mission. The operation began on 19 September, though two days before that a U.S. delegation led by Jimmy Carter arrived in Haiti for negotiations. The military regime then agreed to give up power, causing the operation to suddenly turn from a forced entry to ensuring a peaceful transition of power. Cédras met with Hugh Shelton, the commander of the U.S. forces, on 20 September, and Aristide returned to the country on 15 October. The U.S. was part of a Multinational Force in Haiti that also included troops and assets from several other countries.

The Multinational Force turned over command to the United Nations Mission in Haiti (UNMIH) on 31 March 1995. The U.S. military was at the core and in command of both. Initially, 20,000 U.S. troops were deployed in Haiti for Operation Uphold Democracy in 1994, and from 1995 to 1999, about 4,000 U.S. personnel were rotated through the country as part of a humanitarian support and training mission.

== Background ==
=== Coup and refugee crisis ===
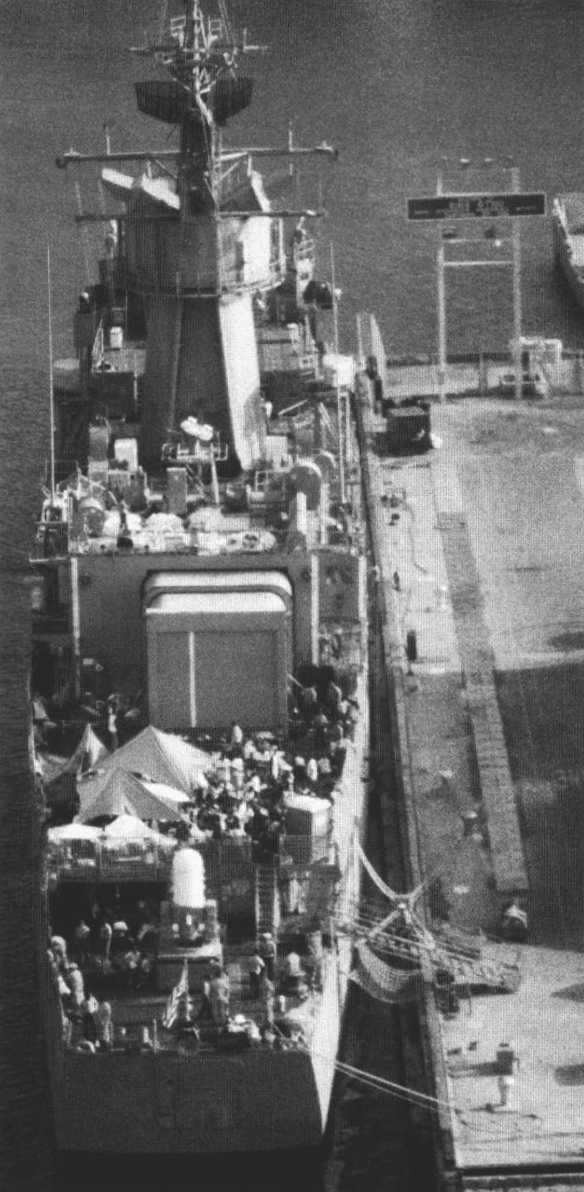
USS Moinester (FF-1097) delivering Haitian boat people to Guantanamo Bay Naval Base during the Haitian refugee crisis in 1991

Following the September 1991 Haitian coup d'état, which led to the de facto leadership of military officer Raoul Cédras, the Organization of American States (OAS) began economic sanctions against Haiti. Following this, the Haitian refugee crisis began, with 14,000 Haitian boat people being gathered from the Caribbean Sea by the United States by January 1992 and President George H. W. Bush forcing Haitian refugees not eligible for asylum to return the following month. The National Assembly of Haiti, Aristide and OAS nations draft the "Washington Protocol" in February 1992, establishing a timeline for restoring democracy in Haiti, though the Haitian Supreme Court declares the protocol null and void in April 1992, leading to increased sanctions from OAS nations. The following month, President Bush signed an executive order banning Haitian asylum and requiring forced repatriation, a policy that was continued by President Bill Clinton. By the end of 1992, 38,000 Haitians were intercepted according to the OAS.

In January 1993 Bush's secretary of state Lawrence Eagleburger had a meeting with his designated successor in the incoming Clinton administration, Warren Christopher, and they issued a joint statement in support of increasing the role of the UN in restoring democracy in Haiti. According to the State Department, the Bush and Clinton teams "have been coordinating closely in a joint effort to support" the UN and the OAS. Some Bush administration officials spoke of the possibility of a military intervention in Haiti, comparing it to the intervention in Somalia, but this did not happen before the change in administrations following the 1992 presidential election. The increasing numbers of Haitian boat people became an election campaign issue, and Haiti was one of the first foreign policy issues that the Clinton administration had to address. The U.S. Coast Guard was expecting between 100,000 and 200,000 refugees to attempt to reach the United States.

=== Diplomatic efforts ===
==== Governors Island Accord ====
After Raoul Cédras rejected a plan for Aristide's return proposed by Dante Caputo, a representative of the OAS and United Nations, the United Nations Security Council (UNSC) voted for an oil and weapons embargo on Haiti in June 1993. A month later, Cedras and Aristide signed the Governors Island Accord, outlining a process for Aristide's return to power by 30 October 1993. In August 1993, Robert Malval was named interim prime minister by Aristide. On 8 October 1993 as the USS Harlan County approached the Port international de Port-au-Prince to participate in training exercises with Haitian authorities, the Haitian Army prevented the ship from landing and Cedras announced that he would not comply with the previously signed accord. On 14 October, Prime Minister Maval's cabinet went into hiding after the Minister of Justice, Guy Malary, was shot and killed. The following day, Cedras ignored the 15 October deadline to cede his leadership and the United States began a naval blockade of Haiti. On 16 October, the UNSC authorized military force, including blockades, to implement international sanctions, with more nations joining the effort.

==== UNSC authorizes military intervention ====
The UNSC established an ultimatum for the military government on 5 May 1994, demanding Cedras to leave Haiti within fifteen days or that he may be removed by force. By July 1994, the United States becomes overwhelmed with Haitian boat people once again and begins to detain more Haitian refugees at Guantanamo Bay detention camp. The same month, the Joint Chiefs of Staff, called for increased participation from Caribbean nations; Lieutenant Colonel Chris Olson was tasked to "get as many flags as possible" and contacted embassies of Caribbean Community (CARICOM) nations to request participation. At a meeting in Port Royal, Jamaica on 22 July 1994, the CARICOM nations of Antigua and Barbuda, Bahamas, Barbados, Belize, Guyana, Jamaica and Trinidad and Tobago each agreed to send a platoon of troops. After months of diplomatic maneuvering by the United States, armed intervention was authorized by the 31 July 1994 United Nations Security Council Resolution 940, which granted the "application of all necessary means to restore democracy in Haiti."

== Operational organization ==
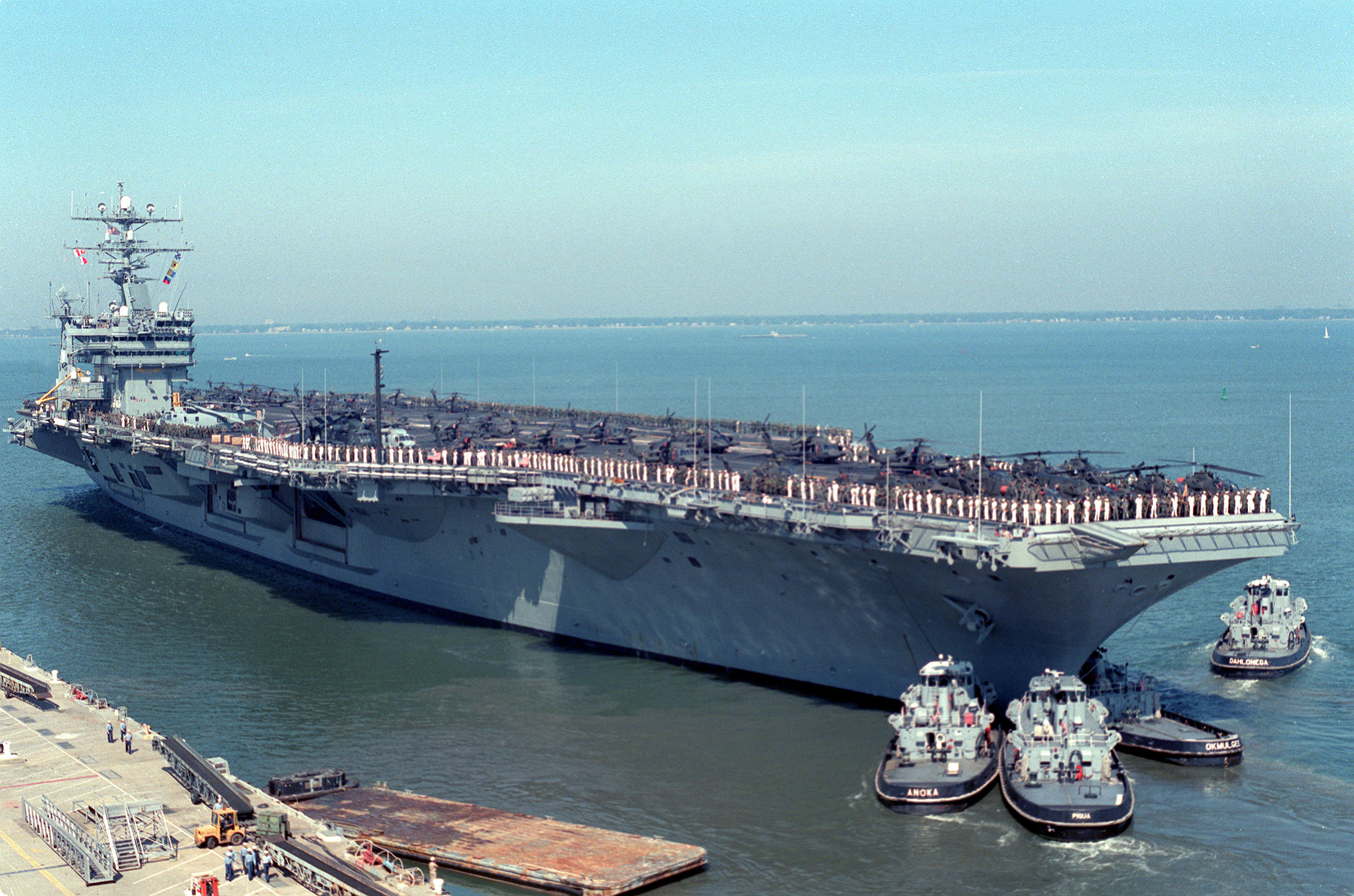
USS Eisenhower leaves Norfolk, Virginia, for Operation Uphold Democracy on 14 September 1994

U.S. military planners spent almost a year developing two possible options for Operation Uphold Democracy, but in early September 1994 a combination of the two was adopted. There was also time to provide additional training for the soldiers of the 10th Mountain Division, which would form the core of the force in Haiti. The proposal for a multinational force was coordinated with international partners.

The operation began with the alert of United States and its allies for a forced entry into the island nation of Haiti. U.S. Navy, Coast Guard, and Air Force elements staged to Puerto Rico and southern Florida to prepare to support the airborne invasion, spearheaded by elements of the Joint Special Operations Command (HQ, 75th Ranger Regiment), followed by 3rd Special Forces Group, the U.S. Army 7th Transportation Group (Army watercraft and terminal elements) and the 10th Mountain Division. Some of these elements were staged out of Hunter Army Airfield and Guantanamo Bay Naval Base. The 1st Brigade of the 10th Mountain Division deployed to Haiti aboard USS America and USS Dwight D. Eisenhower. The operation was directed by Lieutenant General Hugh Shelton, Joint Task Force 120 (JTF-120), provided by Commander, Carrier Group Two.

There were other contributors to the Multinational Force. Three Argentine Navy corvettes of the Drummond class joined the mission to force the commercial embargo of Haiti. The Royal Netherlands Navy provided a frigate and a reconnaissance aircraft, and both the Netherlands and Belgium sent police officers to serve in the country during the operation. Caribbean Community (CARICOM) member states, including Antigua and Barbuda, Barbados, Jamaica, Trinidad and Tobago, Belize and the Bahamas, formed a composite unit of 295 personnel. Bangladesh provided 1,050 troops and Guatemala provided 134. In total, the multinational force involved troops from 15 countries.

== Timeline of events ==
=== Invasion, ultimatum and capitulation ===
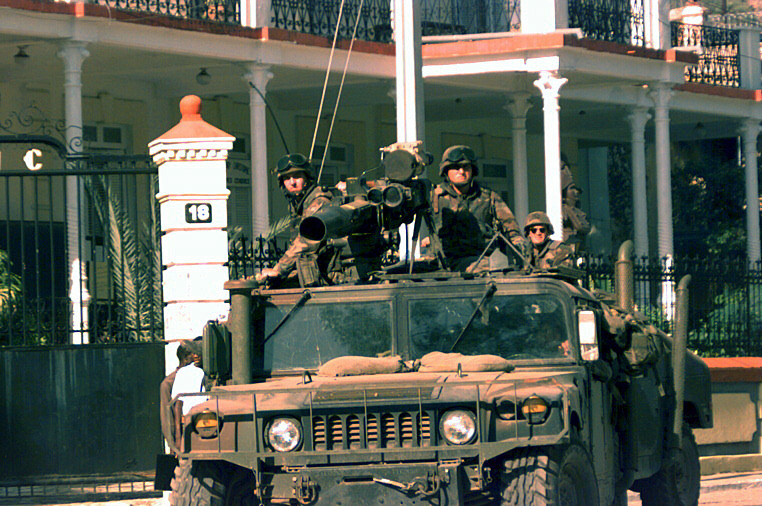
U.S. Marine Corps HMMWV in Cap Haitien, 30 September 1994

On 16 September 1994, as these forces prepared to invade, with the lead elements of Bravo Co., 2nd Ranger Battalion already in the air after being staged in Guantanamo Bay, a diplomatic element led by former President Jimmy Carter, U.S. Senator Sam Nunn and retired Chairman of the Joint Chiefs of Staff General Colin Powell persuaded the leaders of Haiti to step down and allow the elected officials to return to power. The main leader holding power, General Cédras, was the key focus of the delegation. General Powell's personal relationship with Cédras, from when Cédras was a student in the School of the Americas as a young officer, played a significant role in the American delegation gaining an audience with Cédras and enabling the conduct of negotiations for approximately two weeks.

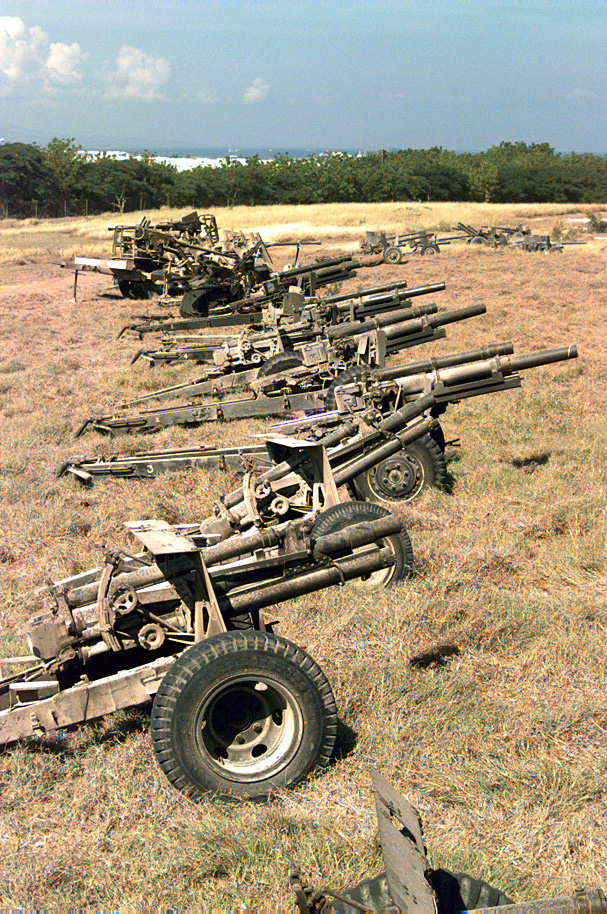
Artillery of the Haitian Army on 24 September 1994.

Despite the insistent diplomatic efforts of the American delegation and the insinuation that force would be used if required, negotiations were at a virtual stalemate for the entire time, with General Cédras refusing to concede the legitimacy of the democratic elections. As a final effort to force him to step down without violence, the delegation presented General Cédras with a video feed of the 82nd Airborne Division's aircraft being loaded with troops, with the Division's DRF-1 (Division Ready Force 1, the Battalion designated first to deploy, with its equipment and vehicles pre-loaded for parachute drop world-wide) 1st Battalion, 325th Airborne Infantry Regiment "Red Falcons" already deployed to Ft. Sherman, Panama. Therefore, the 2nd Battalion, 325th AIR "White Falcons" were attached to the 1st Brigade, 82nd Airborne Division Ready Brigade-1 (DRB-1). While allowing Cédras to process the panic-inducing sight, he was informed that while he assumed he was watching a live feed, he was in fact viewing a video captured more than 2 hours before. As such, the lead elements of the 3,900-strong paratrooper force had already launched from Fort Bragg, North Carolina and were currently over the Atlantic Ocean. They further informed him of the United States' commitment to supporting democracy and that a forced-entry airborne assault on the island nation would, in all likelihood, result in Haiti coming under U.S. control before the next sunrise.

The Carter delegation proceeded to issue a final ultimatum to the Cédras; his choices were to either recognize the wish of the Haitian people as expressed through the democratic election of Jean-Bertrand Aristide and quietly retire, or continue to deny the election's outcome. In the latter case, the U.S. would forcibly wrest control of his country and see justice done. To remove all uncertainty from the general's mind, he was reminded by the delegation that the 82nd Airborne Division had also spearheaded overwhelmingly decisive victories during Operation Urgent Fury in Grenada and Operation Just Cause in Panama in the recent past. Within minutes, General Cédras capitulated under the most favorable terms available to him at that time.

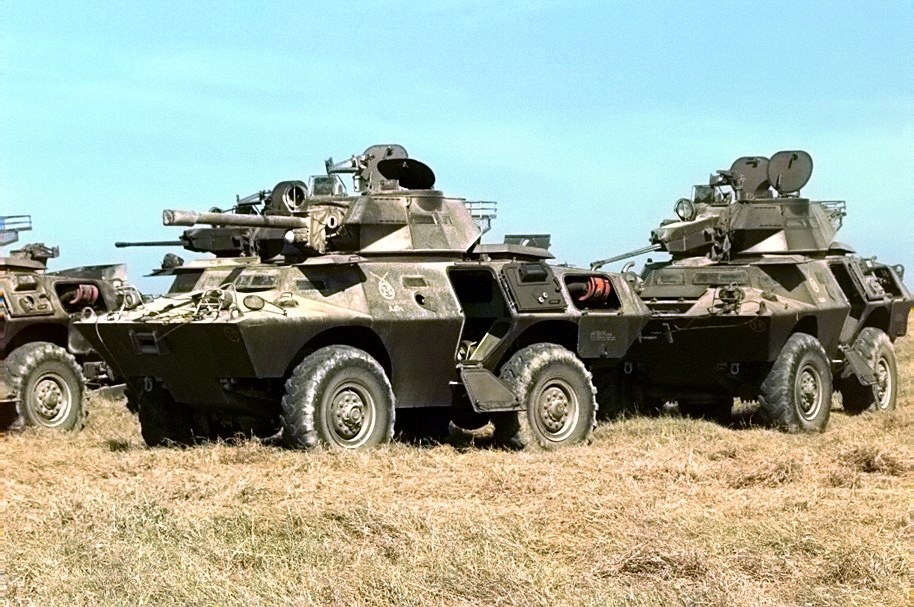
Cadillac Gage Commandos of the Haitian Army on 24 September 1994.

The first U.S. troops began landing at an airfield in Port-au-Prince at 9:30 am EDT / 1:30 pm GMT on 19 September, led by Major General David Meade. Shelton arrived shortly after that.

Cédras's capitulation took time to be decided, and even after it was done, did not immediately take effect among the Armed Forces of Haiti (French: Forces Armées d'Haïti—FAd'H), nor was it immediately followed by other members of the junta. As a result, U.S. forces landing in Haiti saw their objective as severing the junta leadership from the FAd'H without provoking a panic among the rank and file. To facilitate this, General Shelton negotiated a turnover of command from Cédras to Major General Jean-Claude Duperval, who in turn promoted figures acceptable to Aristide into high positions in the FAd’H. Believing that he needed the FAd'H in the short run to avert anarchy, Shelton determined to reform the organization incrementally. Its abrupt collapse, he feared, would start a rapid and uncontrollable social decompression that might result in a large-scale insurgency. American rules of engagement were very restrictive; even paramilitary FRAPH junta supporters were to be treated as a legitimate political entity and thus not subject to neutralization unless they attacked first. Inclined initially to view the Americans as liberators, most ordinary Haitians experienced a profound sense of unfulfilled expectations upon discovery that American soldiers were negotiating and then collaborating with the despised FAd’H in maintaining order in the capital. Many Haitians had expected the U.S. to exact retribution from members of the junta. President Aristide urged the populace to remain calm until his return.

In one case on 20 September, recently landed U.S. Marines from the 2nd Battalion, 2nd Marines, in Port-au-Prince stood by while a protesting crowd was violently dispersed by the Haitian police, resulting in a civilian death. The state of affairs was such that many Haitians did not know who was supposed to be in charge of the city. Following outcry among the U.S. military and citizenry, as well as among Haitians, the U.S. Army quickly changed its rules of engagement. Behind the scenes, Shelton sent an emissary, Colonel Michael Sullivan, commander of the 16th Military Police (MP) Brigade, to Port-au-Prince Police Chief Colonel Michel Francois with an unequivocal message that assaults on the populace would stop or Francois would be held accountable.

The U.S. Marines who occupied Haiti's second largest city, Cap Haitien, had less restrictive rules; they began immediate foot patrols upon arriving, establishing a strong presence. One such patrol came across a FAd'H unit deemed to be making "threatening gestures" on 24 September, resulting in a brief firefight: ten FAd'H troops were killed for no U.S. losses. The incident helped establish U.S. authority in the public's mind (and was received enthusiastically by the populace when news spread the next day), though it was far from the last violent incident of the occupation. On 29 September, a FRAPH terrorist hurled a grenade into a crowd at a ceremony marking the reinstallation of the popular mayor of Port-au-Prince, Evans Paul; the terrorist was apprehended by the Marines the next day and interrogated.

=== Operation Uphold Democracy ===
With his capitulation, the 100-plus aircraft carrying the 82nd Airborne Division were either turned around in mid-air or unloaded before they had a chance to take off. The paratroopers returned to their unit areas on Fort Bragg and they resumed their ready status; only to have the DRF-1 unit, Task Force Panther, deployed to Panama for Operations Safe Haven and Safe Passage on 12 December 1994. The military mission changed from a combat operation to a peacekeeping and nation-building operation with the deployment of the US-led multinational force in Haiti. This force was made up primarily of members of the 3rd Special Forces Group, but also included members of the 16th Military Police Brigade, 118th Military Police Company (Fort Bragg, NC), the 101st Military Police Company, the 988th Military Police Company (Fort Benning, Georgia)and 101st Aviation Brigade (Ft. Campbell, Kentucky), 3/2 ACR from Ft. Polk, Louisiana and Marine Forces Caribbean. Teams were deployed throughout the country to establish order and humanitarian services. Regular Army forces consisting of units from the 10th Mountain Division occupied, 593rd Signal Company Fort Huachuca Ariz. Port-au-Prince with 3rd Bn (Airborne) 73rd Armor Regiment (82nd Airborne Division).

Elements from the U.S. Army Materiel Command and Defense Logistics Agency relieved the Army's 1st Corps Support Command to provide logistical support in the form of the Joint Logistics Support Command (JLSC). The command, later renamed to Combined Joint Logistics Support Command in recognition of its multi-national nature, provided oversight and direct control over all Multinational Force and U.S. deployed logistics units. This included the Joint Material Management Center, JMMC and the follow-on civilian contractor LOGCAP including a senior Defense Support Agency CELL.

Later, 3 Corps deployed the Corps support CMMC, 46th Support Group. Additionally in the early deployments, elements of the 44th Medical Brigade (Airborne), 55th Medical Group, from Fort Bragg {the majority from the 28th CSH (Combat Support Hospital)} provided medical care for service members and Haitians alike. A Joint Psychological Operations Task Force (JPOTF) composed primarily of elements from the United States Army's 4th Psyop Group (Airborne) and reserve augmentees provided continuous, effective information operations support throughout Uphold Democracy and successive operations.

The United States Coast Guard played a significant role in the operation, providing command, control and communications services from the USCGC Chase, a 378' high endurance cutter anchored in Port-au-Prince Harbor. Numerous 210' and 270' medium endurance cutters, 180' buoy tender USCGC Gentian, and 110' patrol boats worked with Navy SEAL gunboats to provide security for forces entering and exiting the twelve-mile exclusion zone and Port-au-Prince Harbor.

In August 1994, 2nd Battalion, 2nd Marines departed for the Caribbean and Haitian waters for Operation Support Democracy. The Battalion once again landed in Cap Haitian, Haiti on 20 September 1994. Participation in Operation Uphold Democracy lasted until October 1994. A squad from Echo Company engaged in a firefight with coup-supporting elements of the Haitian police and military. One Navy interpreter was wounded and several Haitians lost their lives. The 10th Mountain Division was relieved in place by units of the 25th Infantry Division (Light) under command of Major General George A. Fisher Jr. The 25th Infantry Division deployed on 4 January 1995 from their home station of Schofield Barracks, Hawaii and officially assumed command authority from the 10th Division on 9 January 1995. General Fisher and the 25th Infantry Division were the headquarters element of what is officially known as the Multinational Forces, Combined Task Force 190, Republic of Haiti. After the transition from Operation Uphold Democracy, a select few troops were chosen from various 25th Infantry Division units, to redeploy in various Security and Advisory roles in support of the United Nations Mission In Haiti (UNMIH).

The U.S. Army Reserve unit, 458th Transportation Detachment (ATMCT), Belleville, Illinois, was activated and reported to Fort Bragg, North Carolina within 48 hours of notification. This was the fastest a Reserve unit has ever been deployed. The 458th manned the 18th Corps Joint Movement Control Center (JMCC) in support of the mission.

Members of the 450th Civil Affairs Battalion (Airborne) Riverdale, Maryland, USACAPOC(A), (a US Army Reserve unit), were on the initial airborne assault mission of Operation Uphold Democracy. The 450th CA Bn. (A) was the civil affairs unit supporting the 82nd Airborne Division. The unit not only participated with the 82nd, during training operations for this mission, before September 1994, but members of 450th "ready team" were on the C-130 aircraft about to parachute into the country. The parachute jump was aborted within 20 minutes of exiting out the door of the aircraft. The unit returned to Ft. Bragg, and then deployed (air landed) to Haiti the next day, supporting the 10th Mountain Division and Marines. The unit conducted civil affairs operations and remained in the country until December of that year.

=== End of operations ===
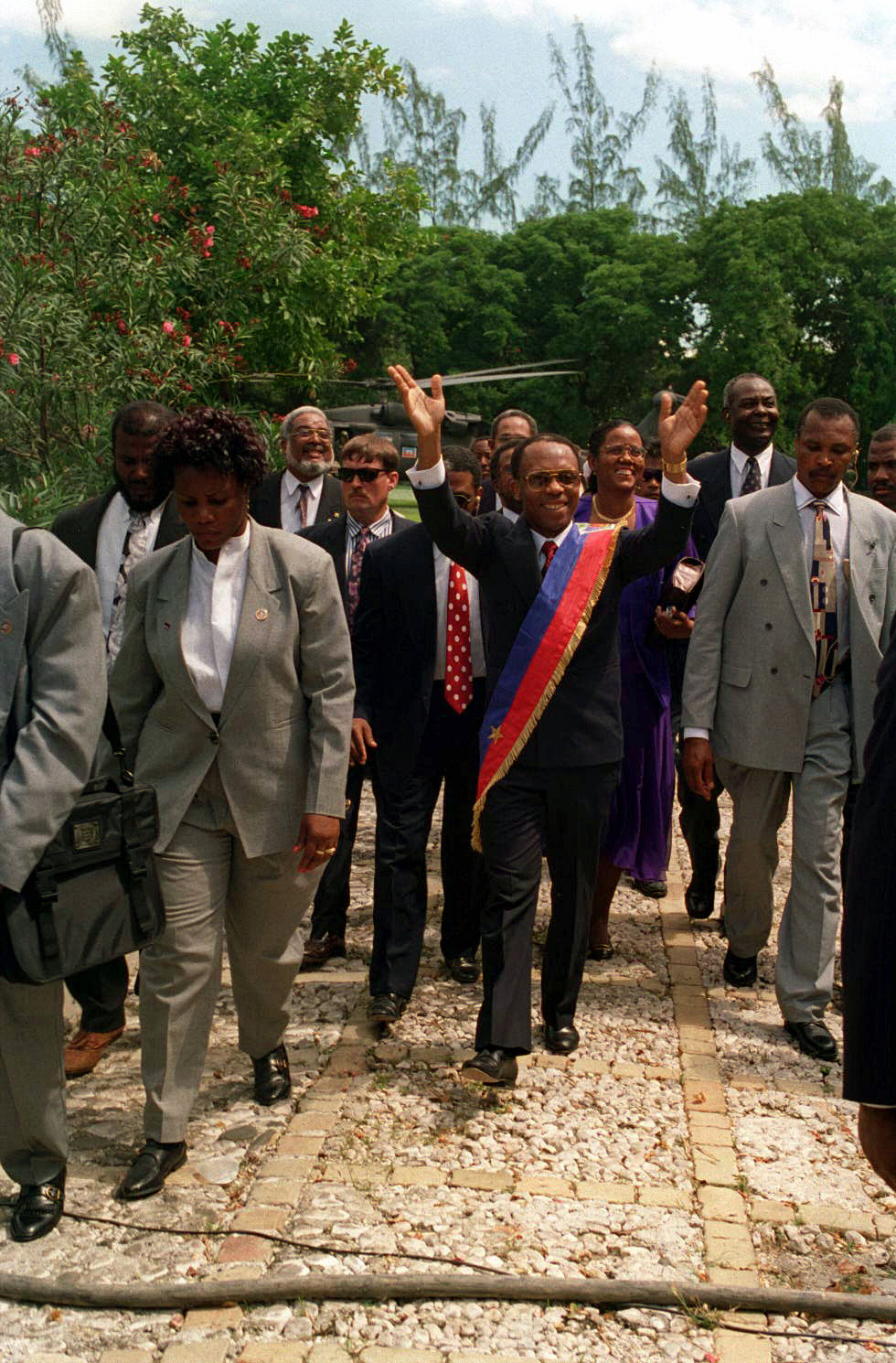
President Jean-Bertrand Aristide returns triumphantly to the National Palace at Port-au-Prince, Haiti, October 1994

Jean Bertrand Aristide returned to Haiti in October 1994 after three years of forced exile. The U.S. forces and their commander, Hugh Shelton, temporarily assumed power in the country. Haitian troops were disarmed, and after the deaths of ten Haitians in a fight with American troops, Shelton went on a tour of military garrisons with Cédras to ensure that the operation proceeded without further incidents. On 12 October 1994, Shelton presided over a change of command ceremony in which Lieutenant General Cédras relinquished command of the armed forces to Major General Jean-Claude Duperval. Cédras then went into exile in Panama, after talks between Aristide and Panamanian president Ernesto Balladares. Aristide arrived at Toussaint Louverture International Airport aboard a U.S. Air Force plane on 15 October, where he received military honors from a Haitian Army battalion in the presence of Duperval. He then went to the National Palace by helicopter, where he gave a speech to assembled Malval government and military officials, and foreign diplomats. Crowds of Haitians listened to his speech from outside the walls of the palace.

Operation Uphold Democracy officially ended on 31 March 1995, when it was replaced by the United Nations Mission in Haiti (UNMIH). U.S. President Bill Clinton and Haitian President Jean Bertrand Aristide presided over the change of authority ceremony. From March 1995 until March 1996, 2,400 U.S. personnel from the original Operation Uphold Democracy remained as a UNMIH-commanded support group under the aegis of Operation New Horizons. The last U.S. members of the UNMIH left the country on 17 April 1996, though 250 U.S. personnel stayed in Haiti as part of Exercise Fairwinds, a humanitarian support mission of the U.S. Department of Defense. They engaged in infrastructure improvement and other humanitarian work. The last U.S. troops stationed in Haiti under the support group left in September 1999, though U.S. forces periodically visited Haiti for training after that under Operation New Horizons, deployed to Cap-Haïtien and Jacmel. Between 1995 and 1999, about 4,000 U.S. personnel rotated through the support group in Haiti.

A large contingent of U.S. troops (USFORHAITI) participated as peacekeepers in the UNMIH until 1996 (and the U.S. forces commander was also the commander of the U.N. forces). U.N. forces under various mission names were in Haiti from 1995 through 2000. Over the course of the operation one U.S. soldier, a special forces staff sergeant, was killed. The soldier died after being struck by gunfire at a roadside checkpoint.
