= United Nations Security Council Resolution 861 =

UN Security Council Resolution 861
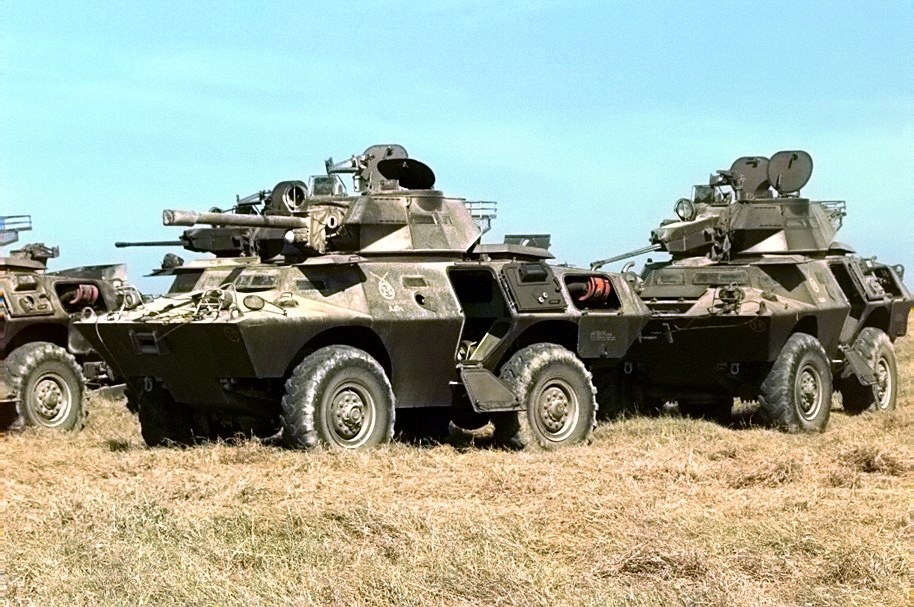
- Haitian tanks
- Date: 27 August 1993
- Meeting no.: 3,271
- Code: S/RES/861 (Document)
- Subject: Haiti
- Voting summary: 15 voted for; None voted against; None abstained
- Result: Adopted

Security Council composition
- Permanent members: China; France; Russia; United Kingdom; United States
- Non-permanent members: Brazil; Cape Verde; Djibouti; Hungary; Japan; Morocco; New Zealand; Pakistan; Spain; Venezuela

United Nations Security Council resolution 861 (UNSC 861), adopted unanimously on 27 August 1993, after recalling Resolution 841 (1993) and welcoming an agreement between the President of Haiti and the commander-in-chief of the Armed Forces of Haiti, the council, acting under Chapter VII of the United Nations Charter, suspended international sanctions against Haiti.

At the same time, the sanctions would be reimposed if at any point the council is informed by the secretary-general that the parties to the agreement or any other authorities in Haiti had not complied in good faith with the agreement. All measures would be reviewed with a view to lifting them definitively when the secretary-general, having regard for the views of the Secretary General of the Organization of American States, informed the security council that all parties have fully implemented the agreement.

The agreement would not be fully implemented which led the Security Council to reimpose sanctions in Resolution 875.

== See also ==
- History of Haiti
- List of United Nations Security Council Resolutions 801 to 900 (1993–1994)
