= United Nations Security Council Resolution 841 =

UN Security Council Resolution 841
- Haiti
- Date: 16 June 1993
- Meeting no.: 3,238
- Code: S/RES/841 (Document)
- Subject: Haiti
- Voting summary: 15 voted for; None voted against; None abstained
- Result: Adopted

Security Council composition
- Permanent members: China; France; Russia; United Kingdom; United States
- Non-permanent members: Brazil; Cape Verde; Djibouti; Hungary; Japan; Morocco; New Zealand; Pakistan; Spain; Venezuela

United Nations Security Council Resolution 841, adopted unanimously on 16 June 1993, after recognising the need for an urgent settlement to the situation in Haiti and the efforts of the Secretary-General of the United Nations Boutros Boutros-Ghali and the Secretary General of the Organization of American States João Clemente Baena Soares, the Council placed various international sanctions on Haiti.

== Background ==
Jean-Bertrand Aristide won 1990–1991 general election, after years of a military dictatorship. However, in 1991, Aristide was overthrown in a military coup and General Raoul Cédras was made leader. Violent resistance to the coup in the country ensued. A number of sanctions were in place against Haiti by the Organization of American States (OAS) and General Assembly, however, these were not compulsory or legally enforceable.

== Resolution ==
The situation was brought to the Security Council by representations from the OAS and Permanent Representative of Haiti. The Council regretted that the legitimate government of Jean-Bertrand Aristide had not been restored, expressing concern that the situation lead to a climate of fear and a possible influx of refugees to neighbouring countries. Considering a request by the Permanent Representative of Haiti, the resolution acknowledged that the situation was unique and warranted exceptional measures.

Acting under Chapter VII of the United Nations Charter, the Council affirmed that a solution should take into account all previous General Assembly and OAS resolutions. It then decided that, on 23 June 1993 at 0:01 hours (EST), the following trade embargo would take effect unless the Secretary-General Boutros Boutros-Ghali reports to the Council that after negotiations such measures are not needed; if the authorities in Haiti did not comply, then the following measures would take effect:

(a) all states should prohibit the sale of petroleum, petroleum products, arms and related materiel including weapons and ammunition, military vehicles and equipment, police equipment and spare parts for any of the aforementioned to Haiti;
(b) a ban on all traffic from entering the territory or territorial waters of the country carrying any of the aforementioned products;
(c) any foreign funds held by the authorities in Haiti would be frozen.

A Committee of the Security Council was also established which was authorised to decide any exceptional imports of petroleum to Haiti for humanitarian reasons. It was set the following tasks:

(a) to report on measures taken by states to implement the sanctions;
(b) consider any violations of the current resolution and recommend appropriate measures;
(c) decide expeditiously requests for the approval of imports of petroleum and petroleum products for essential humanitarian needs;
(d) report periodically on violations of Resolution 841;
(e) to make guidelines to ensure effective implementation of the current resolution.

All countries were asked to co-operate fully with the measures taken and bring proceedings against persons and entities violating the measures. It also requested states to report to the Secretary-General by 16 July 1993, on the measures they had initiated, while Boutros-Ghali was requested to report on the progress he and the Secretary-General of the OAS had made to find a political solution by 15 July 1993. At the same time, the Council committed itself to reviewing the sanctions if the de facto authorities in Haiti signed an agreement to reinstate the legitimate government of Jean-Bertrand Aristide.

== See also ==
- History of Haiti
- List of United Nations Security Council Resolutions 801 to 900 (1993–1994)
- Resolutions 861 and 862
