= United Nations Mission in Haiti =

Peacekeeping Operation by United Nation Organisation

The United Nations Mission in Haiti (UNMIH) was a peacekeeping operation carried out by the United Nations between September 1993 and June 1996. The Mission was reestablished (MINUSTAH) in April 2004, after a rebellion took over most of Haiti and President Bertrand Aristide resigned. This mandate ended in 2017, replaced by United Nations Mission for Justice Support in Haiti (MINUJUSTH), which saw the end of UN peacekeepers in Haiti after its ending in 2019.

== Historical background ==
For most of the Cold War (from 1946 to 1986), Haiti was under dictatorial rule. After the February 1986 military ouster of Jean-Claude Duvalier, Haiti was ruled by a series of short-lived provisional governments (five presidents in six administrations from 1986 to 1991). The country's first democratic national election was held on 16 December 1990, and saw Jean-Bertrand Aristide elected president. Aristide assumed power on 7 February 1991, but was toppled by a military coup a few months later. On September 23, 1993, UNMIH was established by the United Nations Security Council under Resolution 867. The first multinational force was sent to Haiti in 1994 composed of over 1,200 members.

February 2004 marks the reinstatement of the UN peace mission known as "Mission des Nation Unies pour la Stabilisation en Haiti" more commonly known as MINUSTAH. Earlier that month, the country of Haiti was experiencing conflict in the city of Gonaives which then led to armed fights breaking out throughout the country causing a loss of control by the Haitian government. This uprising consumed a great deal of the city and led to President Aristide and the Prime Minister stepping down and the new acting president, Boniface Alexandre took control. After the resignations, the following backlash and conflict from the country led to the return of the UN peace-keeping mission as MINUSTAH. Aristide controversially contends that he was forced from office and kidnapped into exile by agents of the United States.

The MINUSTAH mandate was present for providing security and aid during the aftermath of the 2010 Haiti earthquake, losing 96 peacekeepers during the disaster. It was also plagued by controversies, including rape allegations and a Cholera outbreak.

== MINUSTAH mission mandate ==
A Marruá truck of the Argentine contingent

From the years of 2004 to present the presence of MINUSTAH in Haiti has made significant contributions to the stability of the country. Many missions have been completed and new ones are still being sent in the aid of Haiti every year. With the devastating earth quake and the 2010-2011 presidential elections throughout those years the UN sent more troops in than ever to try and aid in their recovery. The presence of the UN gave the government, police and many other aspects of society support which was very beneficial to the country and continues to be. The official arrival of the MINUSTAH task force in 2004 took action with many goals in mind. Their goals were focused in many different areas around the country for example, aid for the new government, development of their society, strengthening institutions and a large and essential part, the reformation and development of the Haitian National Police Force (HNP).

April 2004 the Security Council in Haiti implemented a resolution by the name of 1542 which established mission MINUSTAH in Haiti. Which then commenced the beginning of the reformation to the country.

From the beginning of the mission police officers from around the world, all from different police forces were sent to Haiti by the UN to aid the HNP deal with the many form of corruption which take place in Haiti every day. The presence of the UN gives the HNP and outlet to gain knowledge on other successful tactics used by renowned police forces. UN Officers are located throughout Haiti and placed in areas that are in need of extra reinforcement. The HNP officers are sent on patrol with the UN police officers to gain insight on how to act and police properly to reform a bit of stability in the areas that are most lacking.

Another important aspect which aids in the future of the HNP and future stability of Haiti as a whole in the presence of the UN Officers in Haiti's Police Academy. The Haitian Academy students are being taught by the UN officers how to police, and taught essential tools for their future police duties. These UN officers are very important for the future of Haiti's security. Since 2004 the MINUSTAH mission, more specifically dealing with the HNP has been very beneficial and has aided in the growth of the Police Force. Although it has a ways to go, along with many other infrastructure that the UN is involved in, due to its progression in 2012 the number of Police officers being sent has been downsized, but still present.

== Mission history ==
India sent 140 troops from the Central Reserve Police Force to serve in the mission in August 1995. The Indian contingent was tasked with providing police protection and maintaining law and order in the country, and served until the end of the mission in June 1996.

== See also ==
- History of Haiti
- MICIVIH
- Operation Uphold Democracy
