= Armed Forces of Haiti =

Combined military forces of Haiti

- Forces Armées d'Haïti (FAd'H) (French); Fòs Ame d'Ayiti (Haitian Creole)
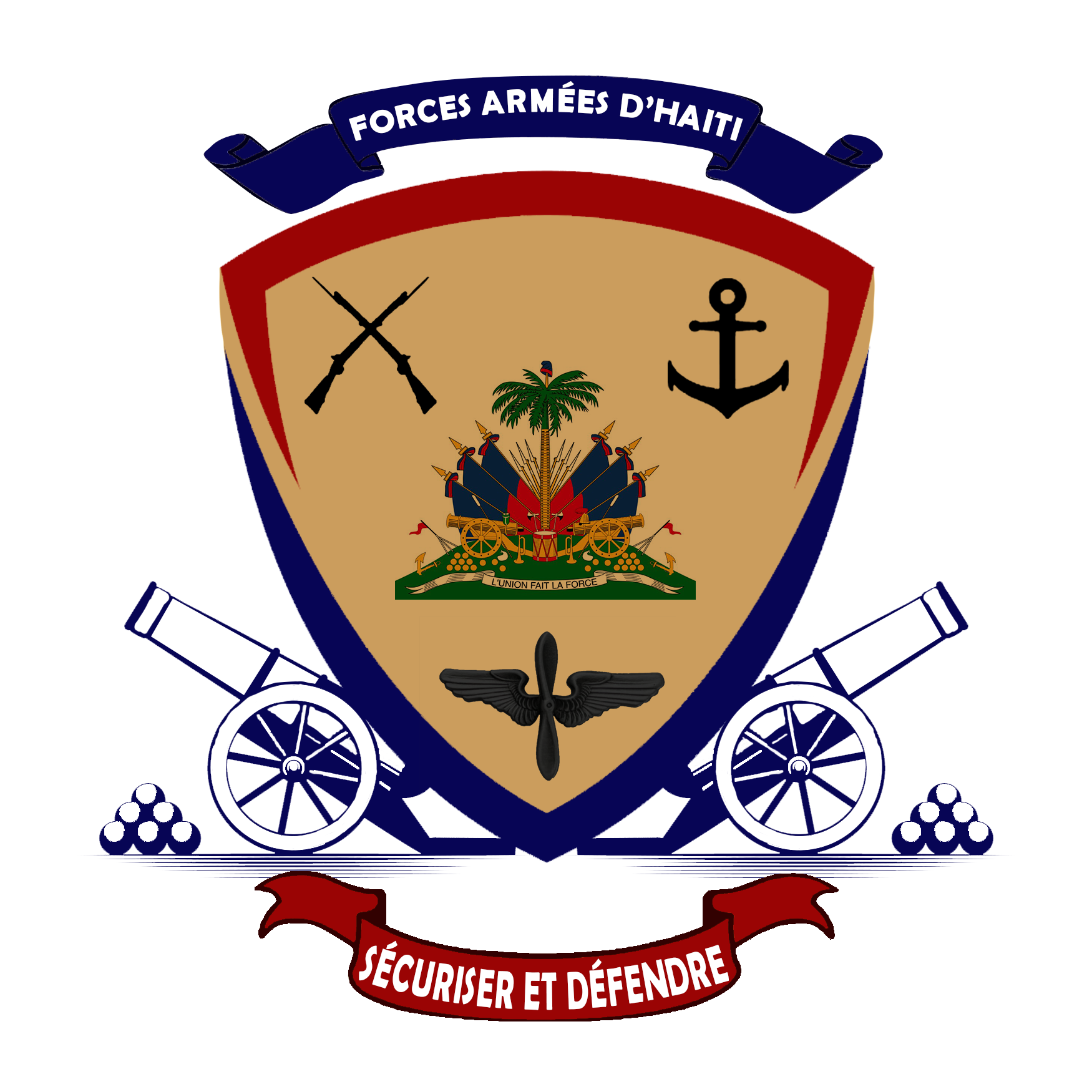
- Logo of the Armed Forces
- Motto: Sécuriser et Défendre 'Secure and Defend'
- Founded: 18 November 1803; 222 years ago (as Indigenous Army)
- Current form: 18 November 2017
- Service branches: Haitian Army; Haitian Aviation Corps; Haitian Navy
- Headquarters: Grand Quartier Général; Port-au-Prince, Haiti
- Website: fadh.ht

Leadership
- Nominal head: Alix Didier Fils-Aimé (acting)
- Minister of Defense: Mario Andrésol
- Commander-in-Chief: Lt.Gen. Derby Guerrier (acting)

Personnel
- Military age: 18–25 (up to 35 for officers)
- Active personnel: 1471

Expenditure
- Budget: HTG 11.9 billion (2026) (US $90.5 million)
- Percent of GDP: 0.2

Industry
- Foreign suppliers: Taiwan; Brazil; Mexico; United Arab Emirates; Argentina; Colombia; France; Canada; United States

Related articles
- History: Military history of Haiti; List of wars involving Haiti; American Revolutionary War; Siege of Savannah (as Chasseurs Volontaires de Saint-Domingue); Haitian Revolution; Colombian War of Independence; Dominican War of Independence; Banana Wars; United States occupation of Haiti; World War II; Battle of the Caribbean; Italian campaign (World War II) (embedded within U.S. Army Air Corps and Tuskegee Airmen); Korean War; Gang war in Haiti
- Ranks: Military ranks of Haiti

The Armed Forces of Haiti (French: Forces Armées d'Haïti, FAd'H; Haitian Creole: Fòs Ame d'Ayiti) are the military forces of the Republic of Haiti, composed of the Haitian Army, the Haitian Navy, and the Haitian Aviation Corps. The Force has about 1,500 active personnel as of July 2026.

The Haitian military originated during the Haitian Revolution as the Indigenous Army (Armée Indigène) that fought for independence, which was formally declared on 1 January 1804. Haiti became a militarized country over the next several decades to protect its independence from a possible return of French troops, and as a result the military dominated the government and administration, with the emergence of a military elite that held the political and economic power in the country. The military was reorganized in the 1880s, being divided between a small active army that underwent the reform, and a much larger reserve army consisting of the old forces. There was also a small navy. Between 1804 and 1915, all except one of Haiti's 26 heads of state were military officers.

The original Haitian Army was disbanded during the United States occupation of Haiti in 1915 and replaced by the American-led and trained Gendarmerie (Gendarmerie d'Haïti). In 1934, it was renamed the Guard of Haiti (Garde d'Haïti) and returned to Haitian command, before being renamed the Army of Haiti (Armée d'Haïti) in 1947. Finally, it was changed to the Armed Forces of Haiti in 1958 by François Duvalier. After years of military interference in politics, including dozens of military coups and attempted coups, Haiti's president Jean-Bertrand Aristide disbanded its military in 1995. The Haitian National Police, a civilian police force, was established that same year to replace the military in providing security.

On 17 November 2017, the armed forces were restored by President Jovenel Moïse. Since then the majority of FAd'H personnel have been engineers, doctors, and agronomists focused on natural disaster relief. Soldiers have provided static defence during the ongoing gang war, notably protecting Toussaint Louverture International Airport from Viv Ansanm's attempted takeover in February 2024, and have supported National Police offensives. An effort is underway to train combat infantry units with the assistance of Colombia, France, and Mexico.

== History ==
=== Origins ===
The origins of Haiti's military lie in the Haitian Revolution. A decade of warfare produced a military cadre from which Haiti's early leaders emerged. Defeat of the French demonstrated Haiti's considerable strategic stamina and tactical capabilities, but Haiti's victory did not translate into a successful national government or a strong economy. Lacking a strong constitution, Haiti was usually ruled by force. The armed forces, who had been united against the French, fragmented into warring regional factions. The military very soon took control of almost every aspect of Haitian life. Officers assumed responsibility for the administration of justice and for municipal management. According to a Haitian diplomat, the country was in its earlier days "an immense military camp". Without viable civilian institutions, Haiti was vulnerable to military personalities, who permanently shaped the nation's authoritarian, personalist, and coercive style of governance.

=== 19th century ===
Haiti's defense fell victim to political vagaries. A readiness for battle and the initiation of defense-related engineering projects in the early 19th century turned out to be costly preparation for conflict against phantom armies. The engineering projects included construction of the citadel of La Ferrière in northern Haiti. Soon afterward, Haiti turned its attention toward the rest of the island of Hispaniola (La Isla Española), which Haiti controlled between 1822 and 1844. Controlling the whole island, however, drained the national treasury and induced torpor in the battle-hardened veterans of the wars of independence.

During the mid-19th century, prolonged instability weakened the military. By the end of the 19th century, Haiti's military had become little more than an undisciplined, ill-fed, and poorly paid militia that shifted its allegiances as battles were won or lost and as new leaders came to power. Between 1806 and 1879, an estimated 69 revolts against existing governments took place; another twenty uprisings, or attempted insurrections, broke out between 1908 and 1915.

During the second half of the 19th century, the army either failed to protect the central government or directly caused the government's collapse. Rural insurgent movements led by piquets and cacos limited the central government's authority in outlying areas. These groups carried on war into the 20th century; they were finally put down by the United States Marine Corps in 1919.

At the beginning of the 20th century, Haiti's political instability provoked interference of the great powers (France, Germany, and the United States). The increasing American interest in Haiti prompted the United States Navy to deploy to the country's ports fifteen times between 1876 and 1913 in order to protect American lives and property, and the United States Marines to occupy the whole country from 1915 to 1934.

The Haitian Navy was created in 1860 with the commissioning of a single gunboat. Two additional gunboats entered service in 1875 followed by a corvette ten years later. By 1900 three British and French-built gunboats had been launched. In 1902 the Haitian gunboat Crête-à-Pierrot had a brief engagement with a German warship. The Admiral of the Haitian fleet, Hammerton Killick, scuttled his ship rather than surrender.

=== 20th century ===
==== United States occupation ====
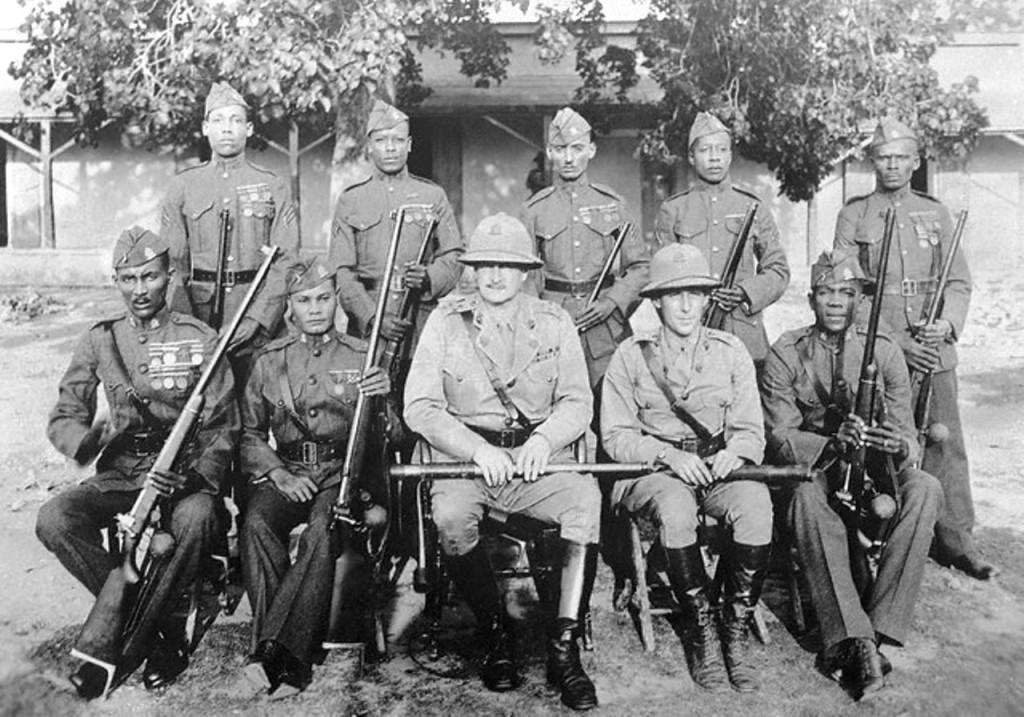
Haitian gendarmes of the 1924 Olympics rifle team, with the head of the gendarmerie, Douglas C. McDougal (center)

The United States Marines disbanded Haiti's army, which consisted of an estimated 9,000 men, including 308 generals. In February 1916, the Haitian Constabulary (Gendarmerie d'Haïti) was formed. United States Marines and United States Navy officers and non-commissioned officers (NCOs) commanded the group. The Gendarmerie attempted to secure public safety, initially by subduing the cacos; to promote development, particularly road construction; and to modernize the military through the introduction of a training structure, a health service, and other improvements.

The United States occupation of Haiti brought order and resulted in some economic and social development. At the same time, the United States overhauled Haiti's disintegrated military infrastructure. The Gendarmerie became the Garde d'Haïti in 1928; the Garde formed the core of Haiti's armed forces after the United States administration ended. The United States sought to establish a modern, apolitical military force in Haiti. On the surface, it succeeded; the organization, the training, and the equipment of the Garde all represented improvements over the military conditions existing before the occupation.

After the United States occupation ended, the Haitian military was given the responsibility to ensure domestic law and order. This concern with internal, rather than with external security, endured throughout the 20th century.

==== Post-occupation period ====
The Haitian Coast Guard was created in the late 1930s. The Haitian Air Force was created in 1943.

Haiti became a party to a number of international agreements, including the Inter-American Treaty of Reciprocal Assistance (the Rio Treaty), the Charter of the Organization of American States, and the earlier Act of Chapultepec (1945). The nation's security concerns regarding neighboring the Dominican Republic and Cuba have been viewed since World War II within the broader framework of the United States strategic interests in the Caribbean. The fact that the FAd'H deployed relatively few of its units along the Dominican border, despite a history of conflicts with its neighbor is reflective of Haiti's limited national security concerns, within this scheme.

==== Korean War ====
At the time of the Korean War, the United States Deputy Representative at the United Nations Ernest A. Gross approached several member states for voluntary troop contributions to the United Nations police action in the Korean Peninsula. The Representative of Haiti, Ambassador Ernest G. Chauvet, informed Gross that his government at the time did not have a standing "army"; In the early 1950s, the Haitian Armed Forces were the "Haitian Guard" or «Garde d'Haïti» (successor to the Gendarmerie of Haiti), which was closer to a gendarmerie than an army. Chauvet still offered to gather volunteers "without difficulty", who would be trained and transported by others.

By late 1951 Haiti would be one of only 6 nations to offered specific contingents to the already present UN Forces in Korea, upon request from the Collective Measures Committee (CMC) under Article 43. A small contingent of Haitian combat troops, embedded with U.S. forces, would join the war against the communist forces of North Korea and China. In 1955, the United States Department of the Army would present military decoration to 10 members of Latin American Forces: Colonel Roger Villedrouin of Haiti would be awarded the Legion of Merit presented by President Dwight D. Eisenhower.

==== Duvalier period ====
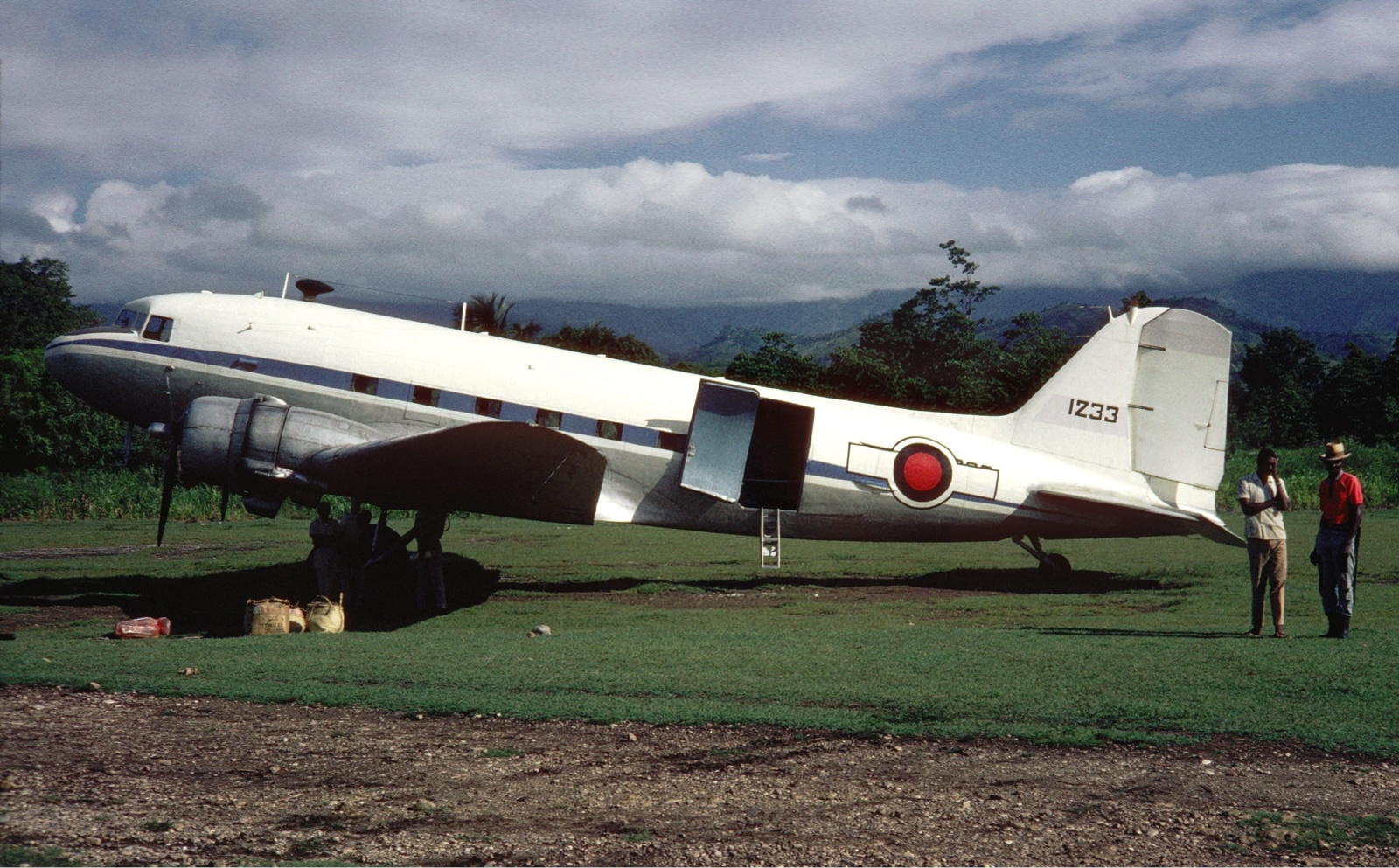
Douglas DC-3 of the Haitian Air Force in October 1969.

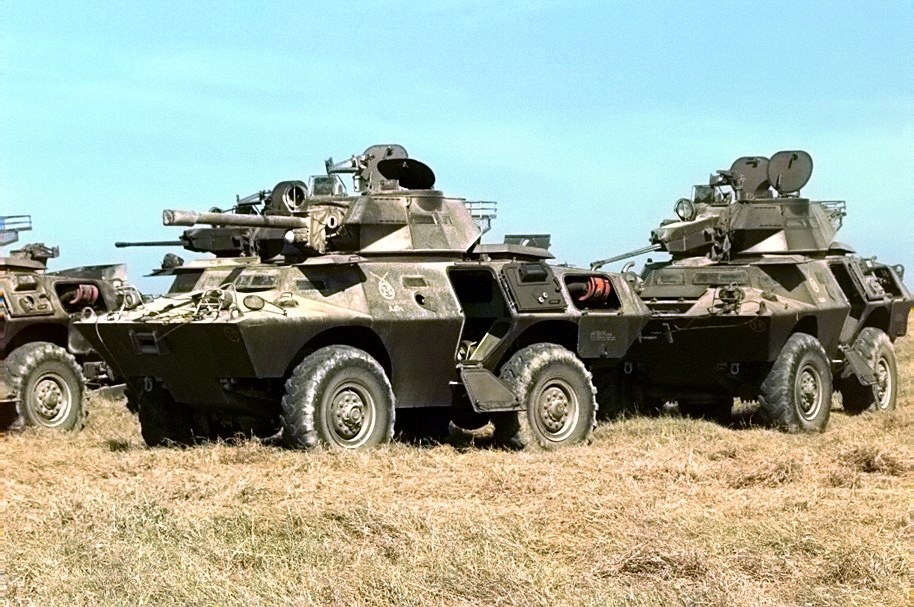
Cadillac Gage Commandos of the Haitian Army on 24 September 1994

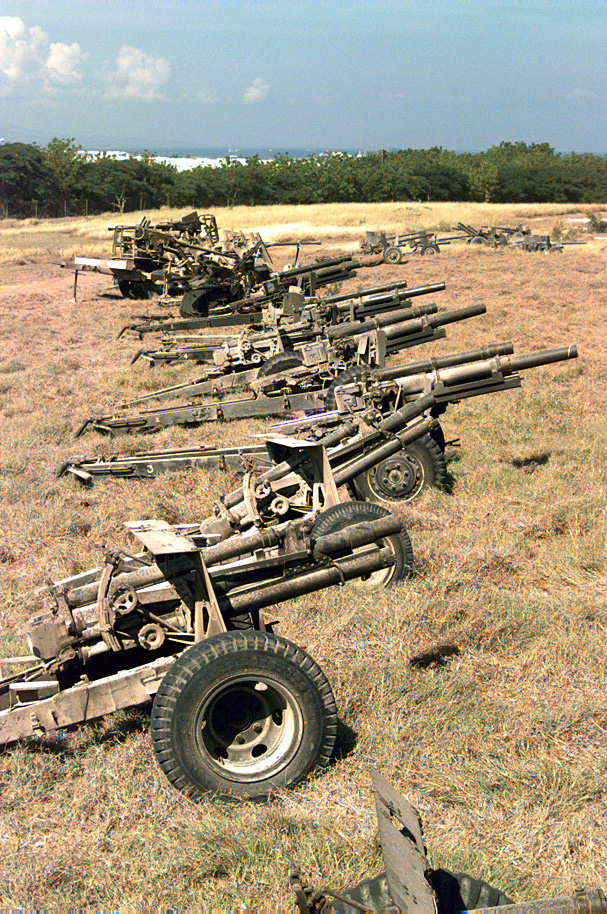
Artillery of the Haitian Army on 24 September 1994

After the establishment of the Duvalier regime in 1957, various external threats have had little impact on Haiti's security. The Duvaliers' tight control eliminated all Marxist influences in the country, thus minimizing the effects of the Cuban Revolution. It was not until 1986 that a communist party, the Unified Party of Haitian Communists (Parti Unifié Communiste Haïtien, PUCH), openly operated in the country. Cuba helped some Haitian refugees travel to Florida in the 1980s, but its overall interest in Haitian affairs has been unclear. The severity of Haiti's political and economic crises, along with the high profile of the United States in the region, has limited involvement by other countries in Haitian affairs.

Threats to Haiti's internal security, however, have been numerous during the past four decades. Between 1968 and 1970, the government repulsed three invasions supported by exiled Haitians. In 1970 the Coast Guard mutinied. The Coast Guard's five ships, low on fuel and ammunition, went into exile at the United States military base at Guantánamo, Cuba. In the early 1980s, Haitian military forces and members of the Volontaires de la Sécurité Nationale (VSN) defeated a small exile force on the Île de la Tortue (Tortuga Island). An airplane dropped a bomb on the National Palace in 1982, and a car bomb exploded nearby in 1983. Exile groups, however, never posed a significant military challenge to the army and the VSN. The real challenge to these forces came in the popular domestic disturbances that developed after 1984.

==== Post-Duvalier period ====
After the collapse of the Duvalier regime in 1986, the FAd'H developed an agenda to exert national political leadership, to restore public order, and to gain control over the VSN and other paramilitary groups, but carrying out this program proved difficult, given Haiti's political, economic, and foreign policy situations.

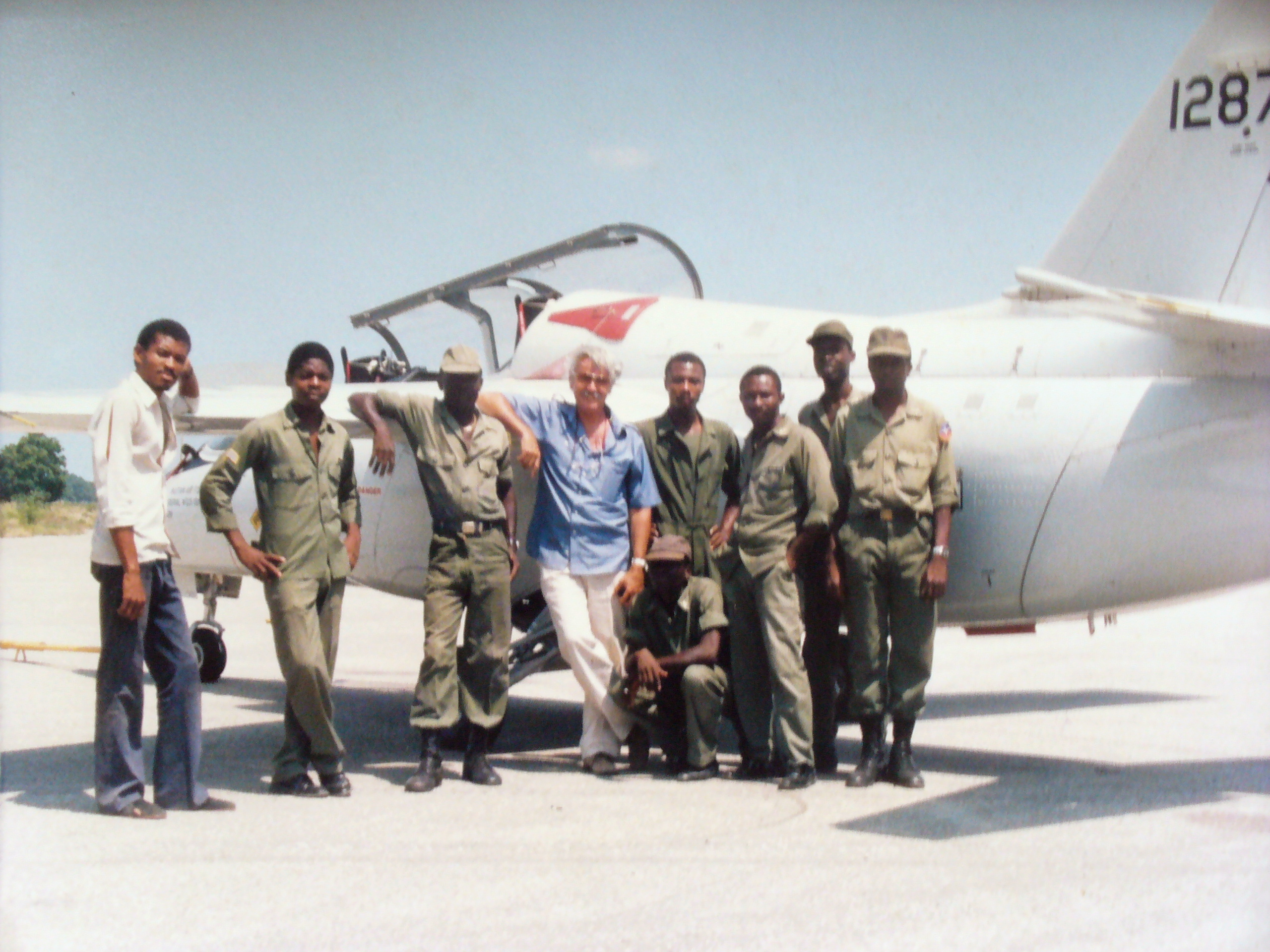
Lynn Garrison and crew with Haitian Corps d'Aviation Marchetti S-211 prior to flight in 1990

The main mission of Haiti's armed forces in the late 1980s continued to be internal security. After 1986, however, this mission regularly conflicted with the national leadership role of the FAd'H. Generational and political differences among officers and a scarcity of resources for the military led to chronic instability that culminated in military coups. These coups caused the government to change hands four times in 1988. A fifth coup in early 1989, however, failed to topple the government. The two most important problems that the FAd'H had to face were, first, a divided senior military command and, second, suspicious junior officers and NCO personnel. These problems became apparent in 1988 when Avril ousted Namphy and subsequently dismissed a number of senior officers. The degree to which NCOs may have been manipulated in this process and the extent to which lower army echelons had begun to shape their own political attitudes caused some observers to doubt the military's future as an institution.

The challenges facing the FAd'H in the late 1980s were more political than military. The largest and most immediate questions revolved around the institution's ability to govern Haiti during a period of political transition and modernization. It remained unclear, in mid-1989, how and when the military planned to transfer power to a legitimate civilian government. Another important problem concerned the personal political ambitions of some army commanders. It was also unclear how the FAd'H would respond to these challenges because the institution had not demonstrated viable national political capabilities. The FAd'H was ill-prepared for this broad new role in national life because François Duvalier had severely limited its role in government affairs.

Other security-related problems included narcotics trafficking. United States officials have expressed concern over Haiti's role as a major transshipment area for narcotics, mainly Colombian cocaine bound for the United States. This role apparently expanded after Jean-Claude Duvalier's fall. The United States Drug Enforcement Administration opened an office in Port-au-Prince in October 1987 to help Haitian authorities control drug trafficking; however, the lack of a professional police force in Haiti hindered these efforts. The FAd'H appeared ambivalent toward the narcotics issue because drug-related corruption reportedly involved hundreds of members of the officer corps and because some officers resented pressure from Washington. Avril, however, attempted to placate United States concerns by dismissing some officers linked to drug trafficking. The most prominent among the dismissed officers was Col. Jean-Claude Paul, a former commander of the Dessalines Battalion, who was indicted in March 1988 by a Florida grand jury on charges of cocaine distribution. Haiti had signed an extradition treaty with the United States, but the agreement did not cover narcotics-related offenses, so Paul never faced trial on the charges.

Paul's continued service in the army posed a political problem, and Avril asked him to retire. In November 1988, however, Paul died mysteriously, possibly a victim of poisoning. Paul's death removed a major narcotics figure and a potential threat to Avril's political power.

Unstable and unstructured civilian politics and institutions also undermined Haiti's stability. Some Duvalierists sought to use the armed forces completely or partially to restore the ancien régime. At the same time, more democracy-oriented civilian groups, all of which lacked strong institutional bases, continued to be suspicious of the army's political leadership. The weak economy and the international media's criticism of Haitian affairs resulted in financial and public-relations problems for the army; and, because Haiti's political environment remained volatile and because the army did not always appear to be in control of the country, Haiti faced more unrest and the possible development of insurgency movements. On the one hand, Haiti's armed forces was still one of the few institutions of national magnitude, but, on the other hand, the armed forces suffered from serious institutional deterioration and diminished cohesion. In 1989 the military was struggling to provide political leadership at a time when it faced its own disintegration.

==== Disbandment ====
After years of military interference in politics, including dozens of military coups (from two Duvalier-period attempts in 1958 and 1963 to the last one staged in 1991), Haiti disbanded its military in 1995. Haiti's National Assembly created new civilian law enforcement, with the heavily armed Haitian National Police, and the Haitian Coast Guard, with the help of the United States and the United Nations. However, no official constitutional amendment to abolish the military was introduced. The United Nations Stabilization Mission in Haiti (MINUSTAH) has been authorized to complete the disarmament and demobilization of any remaining militias.

Without its own military, Haiti relies heavily on United Nations (UN) peacekeeping forces. The multinational force has been responsible for quelling riots and preparing for democratic elections. Before UN forces arrived, a multilateral force made up of troops from Canada, Chile, France, and the United States helped stabilize the country under the interim leadership of President Boniface Alexandre.

Haiti has no obvious external threats. Tensions have long existed between Haiti and the Dominican Republic, but the current border has been fixed since 1936.

=== 21st century ===
==== Reformation ====
In July 2017, it was announced that Haiti's government would be launching a campaign to re-establish the army after MINUSTAH termination. According to the announcement, the government wanted to recruit about 500 men and women, between the ages of 18 and 25, who have passed their secondary education exams. The role of the army would be to help deal with natural disasters and to patrol Haitian borders.

Members of the Haitian military are being trained through military cooperation with Ecuador (up until 2017), Mexico (since 2018), Argentina (since 2019), France (since 2024), and Colombia (starting 2025). Since the formation of the TPC in 2024, meetings have been held with the United States, France, Argentina, Mexico, Taiwan, Brazil, Colombia and Canada on the matters of defense partnership, military cooperation, training, and military acquisitions.

The Haitian Armed Forces have been deployed to areas hit with natural disasters like the 2021 earthquake, performed sanitation, medical and vaccination campaigns, and more recently have been deployed to support the Haitian National Police in the fight against gang violence and terrorism. Servicemembers currently protect the Airport perimeter, and have been operating a patrolling in areas like the Champ-de-Mars, Delmas, Solino, Bicentenaire, and Kenscoff. The government intends to deploy military members to protect the bay of Port-au-Prince and the port, as well as fight increasing piracy. A new military base was opened in the metropolitan area in late November 2024 to increase the capacities of the armed forces.

In February 2026, the Haitian government was allowed to acquire military equipment from the US for the FAd'H.

== Former organization ==
The army and air force were the better equipped branches of the armed forces, with the navy the least equipped over the years and up to 1994.

== Organization ==
The General Headquarters of the Armed Forces of Haiti (Grand Quartier Général des Forces Armées d'Haiti) seats at its historical site on the Champ de Mars, across from the ground of the National Palace (Palais National).

The Corps of Engineers are based on an installation on the Bicentenaire, adjacent to the old locales of the Venezuelan embassy. The National Guard Unit and Medical Unit are based in the Military Aviation Base.

The Aviation Corps (Corps d'Aviation des Forces Armées d'Haiti) has its garrison at the Military Aviation Base (Base de l'Aviation Militaire), located at the former base of the Chilean Air Force battalion of the MINUSTAH (attached to Toussaint Louverture International Airport).

There is currently only one recruit depot used for basic training, the "Centre de Formation Militaire Anacaona de Léogâne" (Anacaona Military Training Center of Léogâne), located on a former MINUSTAH South Korean Army battalion base in Léogâne.

On 3 October, The Defense Ministry and Transitional Presidential Council announced plans to install an additional military base in Tabarre, on the grounds of a former MINUSTAH camp that housed the Brazilian Army infantry battalion, the Paraguayan Army Corps of Engineers battalion, and the Argentine Air Force Mobile Field Hospital from 2004 to 2017. Across the road from the site is the locale of the United States embassy in Port-au-Prince. The base, named "Base Vertières" would be inaugurated on 18 November 2024, for the occasion of the 221st anniversary of the Battle of Vertières. The installation is over 2.5 acres in area, will have a basic training camp, and is adequate to host military equipment including helicopters.

The government also has plans of building training camps in the north and south of the country to rapidly fill up the ranks, and reach the critical numbers required to serve and defend the country.

=== Command structure ===
According to Article 143 of the Constitution of Haiti, the president of the Republic is the nominal head of the armed forces, but does not command them in person. The title of commander-in-chief is held by a general officer who commands the Armed Forces of Haiti, per Article 264–2.

- Commander-in-Chief: Lieutenant General Derby Guerrier (acting)
- Deputy Commander-in-Chief: Major General Jonas Jean
- Inspector General: Brigadier General Jean-Robert Gabriel
- Chief of General Staff: Brigadier General Emmanuel Azémar
- Assistant Chief of Staff (G1): Colonel Jean Garry Greffin
- Assistant Chief of Staff (G2): Colonel Edwin Florexil
- Assistant Chief of Staff (G3): Colonel Néoclès P. Arné
- Assistant Chief of Staff (G4): Colonel Fontane Beaubien
- Secretary of the General Staff: Colonel François-Marie Sandry Charles-Pierre
- Commander of the Aviation Corps: Colonel Brierre Mars
- Commander of the Navy: vacant

== Mission ==
In accordance to Article 266 of the Constitution of Haiti, the duties of the Armed Forces of Haiti are:

- to defend the country in case of war
- to protect the country against the menaces coming from abroad
- to assure the surveillance of the land, maritime and aerial frontiers
- to lend a strong hand, on request motivated by the Executive Power, to the Police in the case that the latter cannot execute its task
- to help the nation in the case of natural disaster
- in addition to the attributions that are particular to them, the Armed Forces of Haiti may be assigned to tasks of development.

== Culture ==
The official anniversary date of the Armed Forces of Haiti is 18 November, coinciding with the celebrations of the victory of the Battle of Vertières.

== Service branches ==
The Armed Forces is composed of the Land, Air, and Maritime forces, per Article 264 of the Haitian Constitution.

The service branches are:

- Army (Force de Terre)
  - National Guard (Garde Nationale)
- Aviation Corps (Force de l'Air)
- Navy (Force de Mer)

== Budget ==
On 2 October 2024, PM Conille posted an infographic on his Twitter account, demonstrating that, in the 2024–25 budget, the defense budget would increase 252%, and the military budget by 463% compared to the previous year. The General Direction of the Budget (and the Ministry of Economy and Finances) released the budget report in the official newspaper of the Republic of Haiti, Le Moniteur; It reported the total budget of the Armed Forces of Haiti at HTG 6.976 billion (USD $52.9 million), a significant increase from HTG 1.272 billion (US$9.6 million) in the 2023–2024 budget: that would place the military spending at 0.2% the annual GDP, using the IMF estimate of US$26.27 billion for Haiti, as of October 2024. This increase comes as the TPC and Conille government reiterate their support for modernization in the Armed Forces of Haiti, so it can increase its operational capabilities, and take its rightful place in defense and service of the nation. "Security cannot wait" said Prime Minister Garry Conille. Investment in the working and living conditions on military installations, and in healthcare, lodging for the troops and their families are also part of the promises made by the Conille government.

=== 2024–25 ===
Presidential Council member, Fritz Jean, brought up plans to establish an emergency "war budget" to better fund and equip the armed forces and police to fight rampant gang violence and terrorism. The revised budget was announced on 14 April 2025, which would increase the armed forces' budget to HTG 8.376 billion ($64 million), which includes a HTG 1.6 billion investment.

=== 2025–26 ===
The 2025–26 military budget is at HTG 10.6 billion, where HTG 5 billion dedicated to investments. An additional HTG 960 million is planned to be allocated to the FAd'H in the revised budget.

== Modernization ==
The plans of modernization of the Armed Forces of Haiti included making it a professional military, a force that was more than just a fighting force. In 2015, Haiti would complete the workshop for the White Book of Defense and Durable Development in collaboration with the Inter-American Defense Board, making it the first Caribbean nation to obtain the document, and 19th in the hemisphere. The document is aimed at reinforcing the rule of law and stabilization by modernizing the state institutions. The first elements of the reinstated armed forces was trained by Ecuador. Cadets and NCO candidates trained at the Ecuadorian Army schools.

After the formation of the Garry Conille Government, and the appointment of Jean Marc Berthier Antoine as Minister of Defense in June 2024, meeting have been had with the ambassadors and chargé d'affaires of the United States (as well as representatives from the United States Southern Command), Taiwan, France, Argentina, Mexico, and Canada These meeting entailed discussions over defense cooperation, security partnership, and the formation and training (basic training and continuing formation) of members of the armed forces. On 28 August 2024, a recruitment drive for the 3rd enlisted that resulted in 8,000 young people turning up to join up. Haitian Prime Minister Garry Conille had planned to expand, modernize and improve military quality of life.

On 25 August, outgoing French ambassador Fabrice Mauriès stated that France has always supported the Haitian Armed Forces and confirmed that starting September 2024, members of the armed forces would start travelling to Martinique for training with the French Forces to the Antilles. On 29 August 2024, Taiwan donated personal protection kits to the AFH including ballistic helmets, eye protection, vest/plate carrier with pouches, gloves, and knee pads.

Human rights protection is a key component of the modernization of the Armed Forces; in August 2024, service members would complete a course on Human Rights, International Humanitarian Rights, as well as Gender Equity. This training was used to update the basic training manual for the future recruit classes.

Negotiations are being had with the United Arab Emirates for technical assistance and formation on the matters of defense, operational expertise using military technology, and logistical self-reliance concerning equipment and vehicle maintenance.

While on official visit to Washington, Haitian Minister of Defense Jean Marc Berthier Antoine, held meetings with the Organization of American States (OAS), the Inter-American Defense Board and the Inter-American Defense College in the efforts of mustering international support for Haiti in the fight against insecurity, specifically through international support for efforts in modernizing the armed forces. A proposed commission composed of representatives of Ministries of Defense from the region, the IADB and the Department of Hemispheric Security of the OAS, will be tasked of coordinating international efforts to reinforce the Armed Forces of Haiti, with accents on training, technical assistance, and equipment. On 22 October 2024, a 5-year plan to recruit 20,000 officers, non-commissioned officers, and enlisted troops (or 4000 per year) was unveiled, with the support of the Secretary General of the Organization of American States, Luis Almagro and 15 member states (Argentina, Bolivia, Brazil, Chile, Canada, Colombia, Ecuador, El Salvador, United States, Guatemala, Honduras, Mexico, Paraguay, and Peru), via technical cooperation. The minister emphasized the need for training in crisis management, counter-terrorism, law enforcement, and security in conflict zones; modernizing training infrastructure, equipping the troops with the necessary tools like APCs, battle vehicles, drones; digitizing management systems, as well improving the working conditions. Minister Berthier Antoine reiterated that the government's priorities were to build a modern, professional armed forces, with hundreds of professions, all crucial to long term security and development.

Mexico will be supporting the modernization and strengthening efforts of the AFH by welcoming 700 army recruits who will be trained by the Mexican Army. On 24 July 2025, the first group of 150 recruits departed to Mexico for 3-months long training course aboard Mexican Air Force EADS CASA C-295 planes, who brought 1000 personal protection kits to the Haitian military, courtesy of the AMEXCID. Since 2018, Mexico has provided training for 912 Haitian troops.

Colombia announced that the Military Forces of Colombia would be training a total of 1000 recruit, in Colombia; 500 of the recruits will be trained by the National Army of Colombia, 250 by the Colombian Navy, and 250 by the Colombian Aerospace Force. The commander-in-chief of the Haitian Armed Forces, Lt. Gen. Derby Guerrier, is expected to travel to Colombia with the branch commanders on 28 July 2025 to assess the training grounds and set a timeline for the arrival of the first 200 recruits.

Seven Roshel Senator RAM MRAPs were delivered to the AFH in November 2025. These were the first part of an order of 17 armored vehicles that will also include fighting vehicles. The Senator MRAP is manufactured by Roshel, a Canadian defense manufacturer. This purchase was a major step for the Haitian military, marking its first major military equipment acquisition since remobilization in 2017. Prime Minister Alix Didier Fils-Aimé noted that the country's military had "spent years without any of our international partners agreeing to allow the FAd'H to use these types of equipment. We made a tremendous effort to ensure that, on the eve of November 18th, the date of the Battle of Vertières, this equipment would be handed over to the army." President-Counsellor Leslie Voltaire also promised that negotiations were on the way to acquire aerial and maritime vehicles.

== Personnel ==
=== Rank structure ===
==== Officers ====
The rank insignia of commissioned officers.

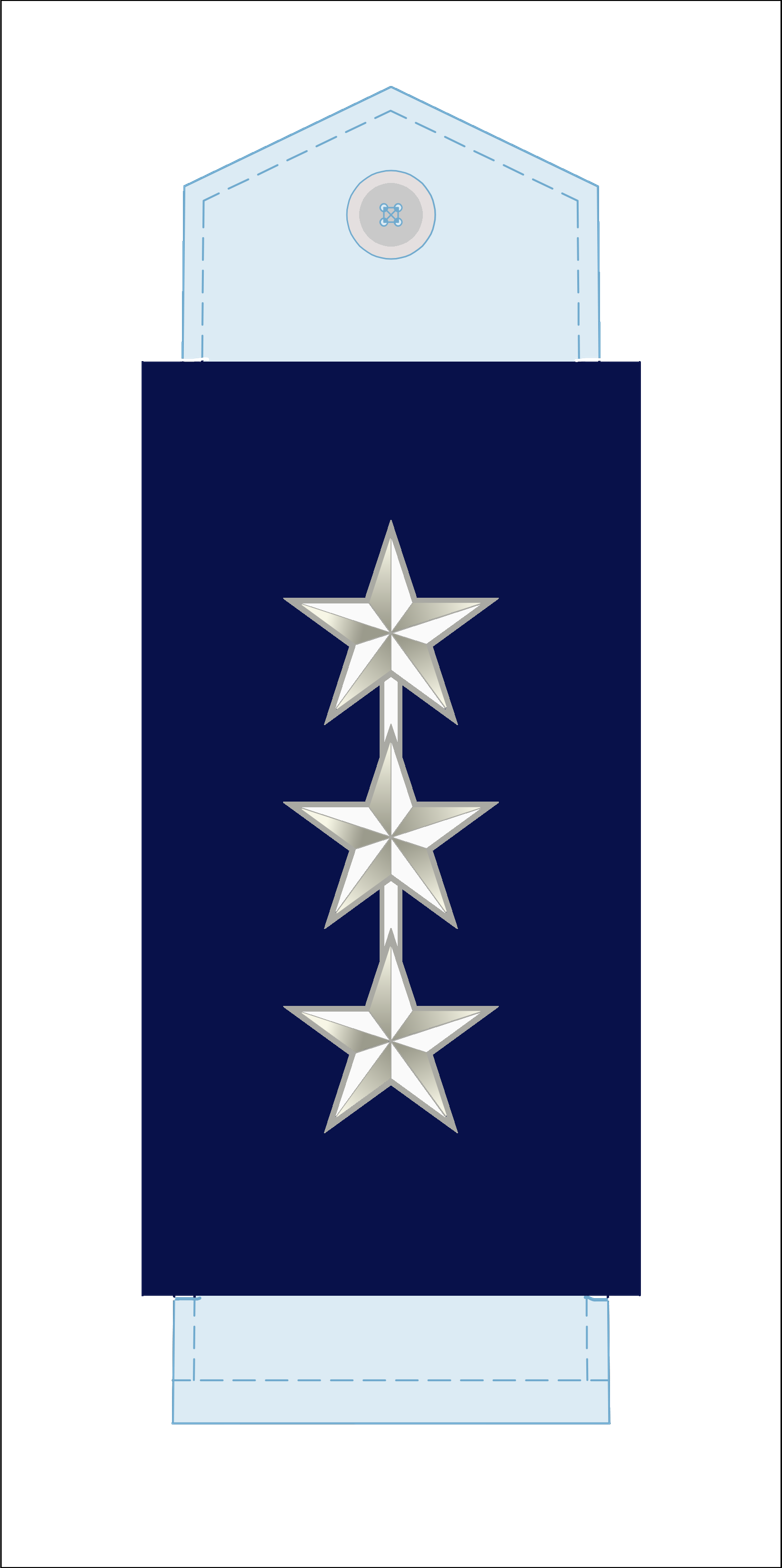
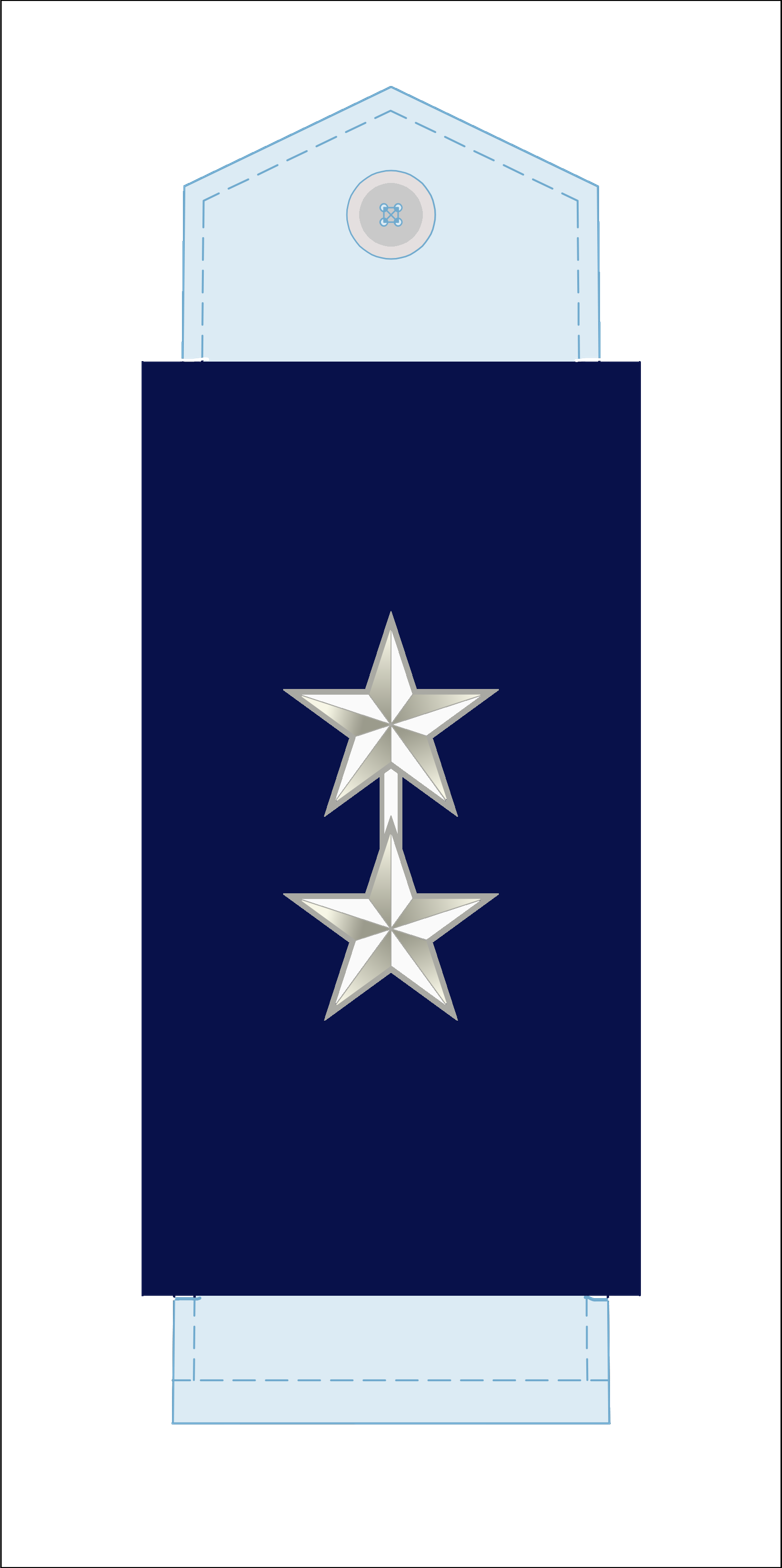
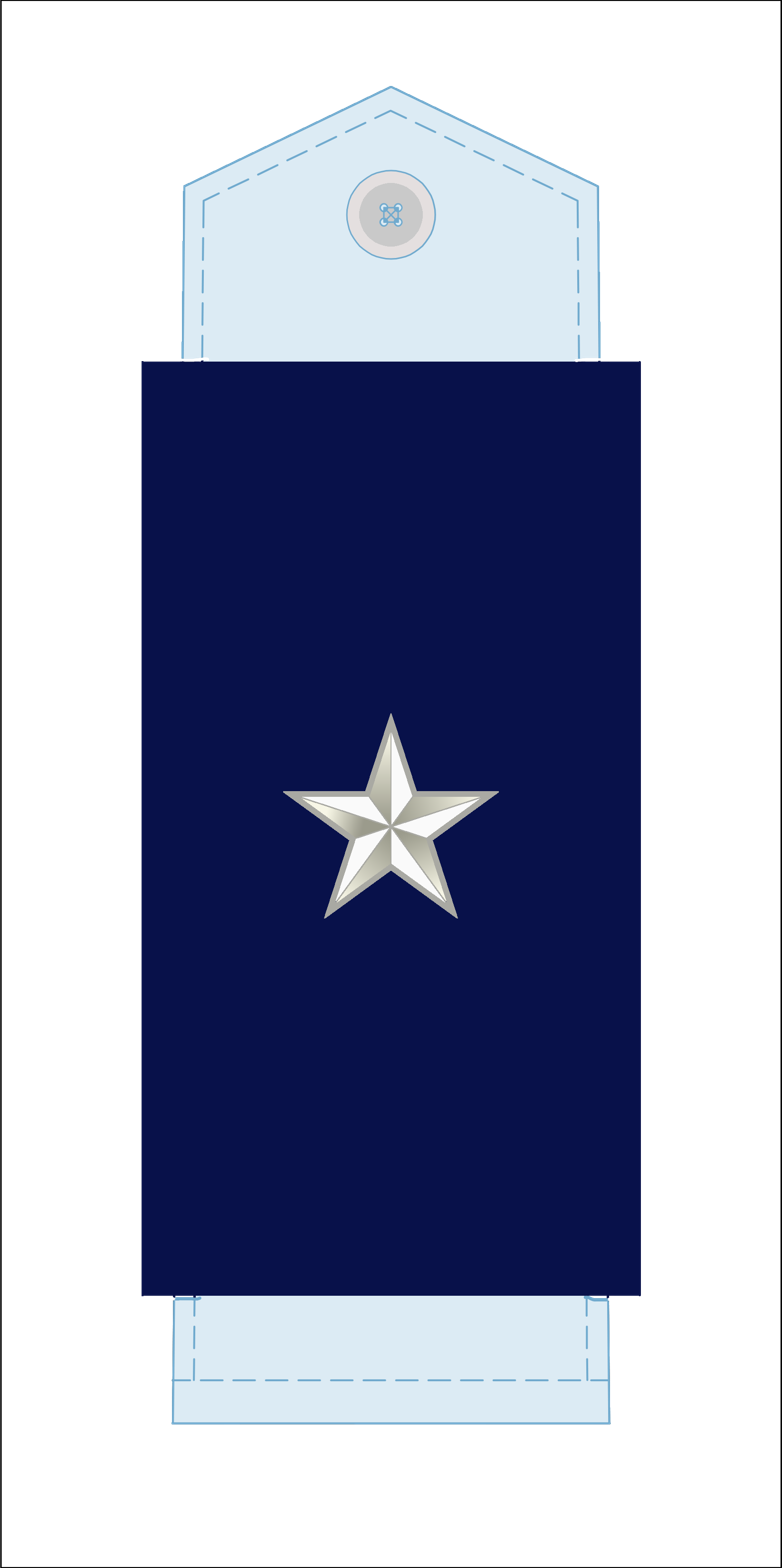
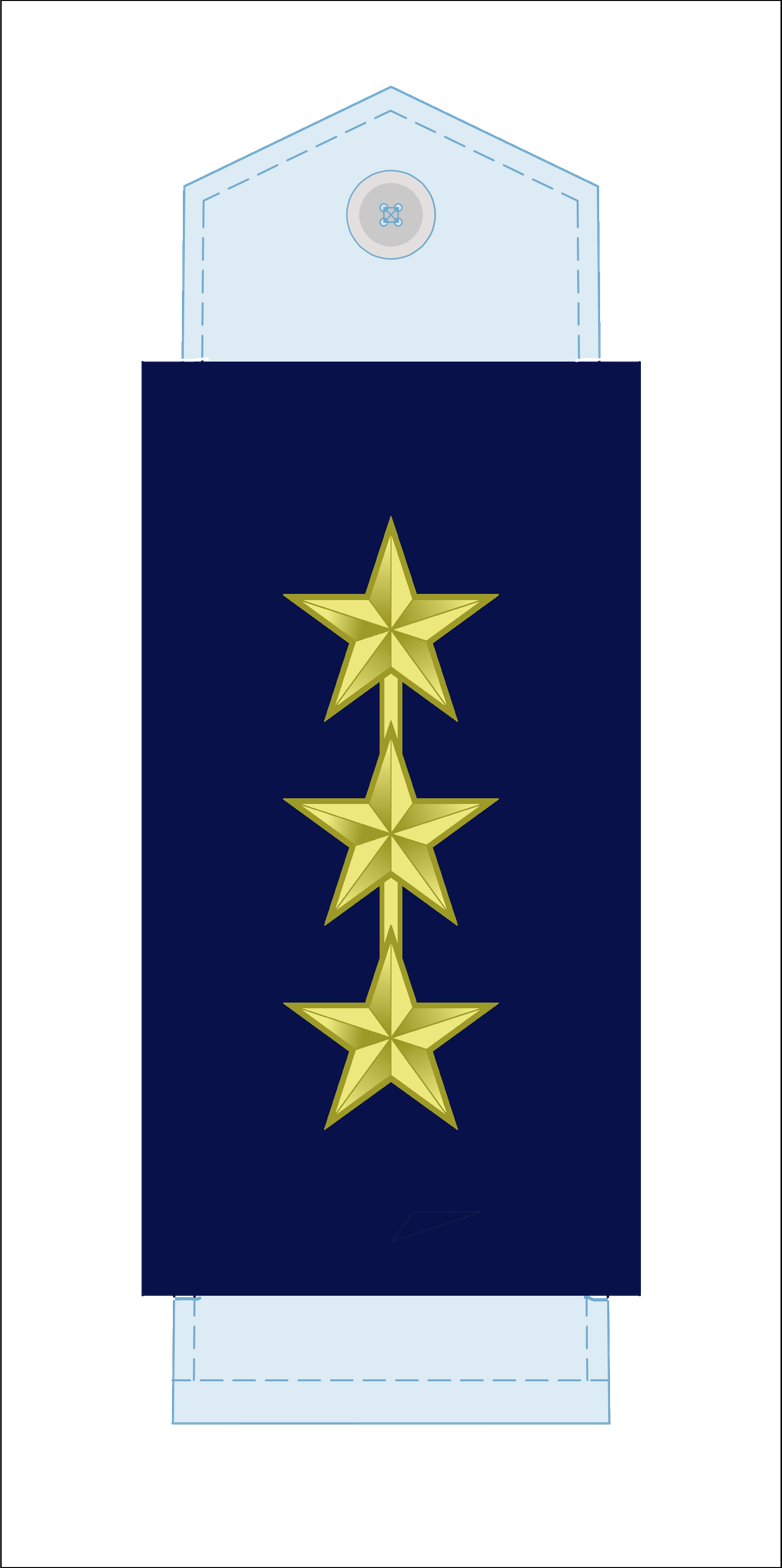
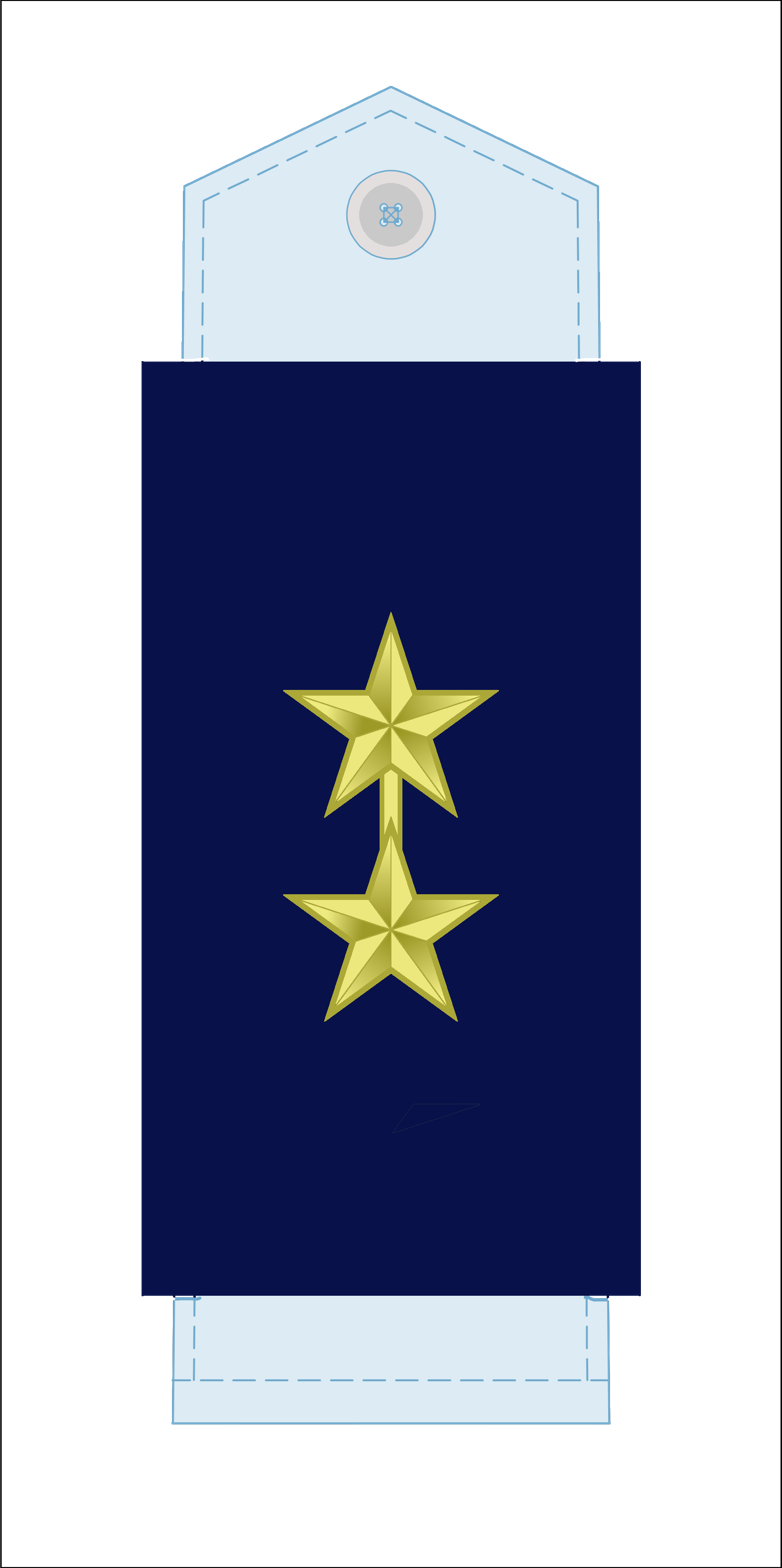
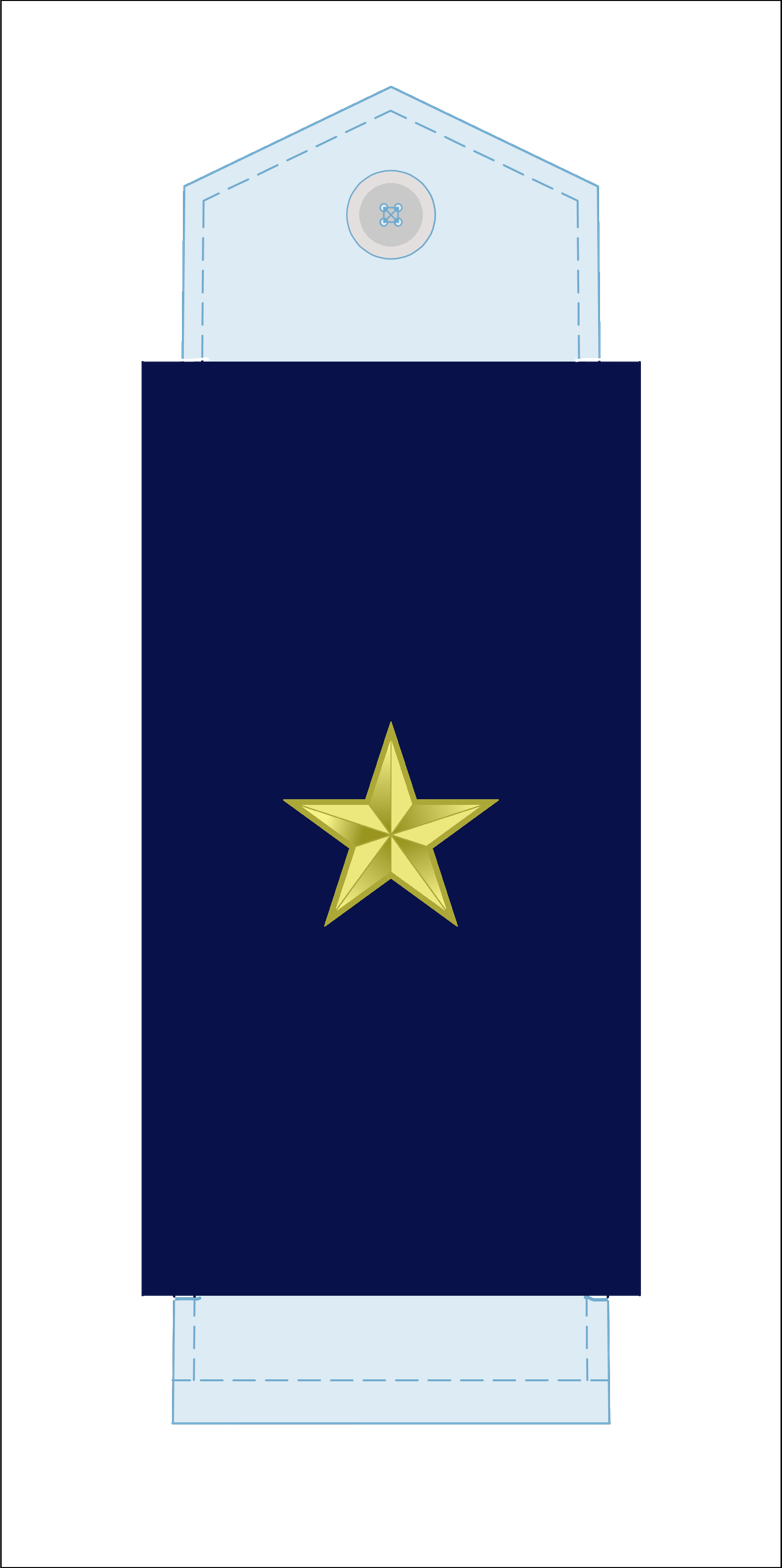
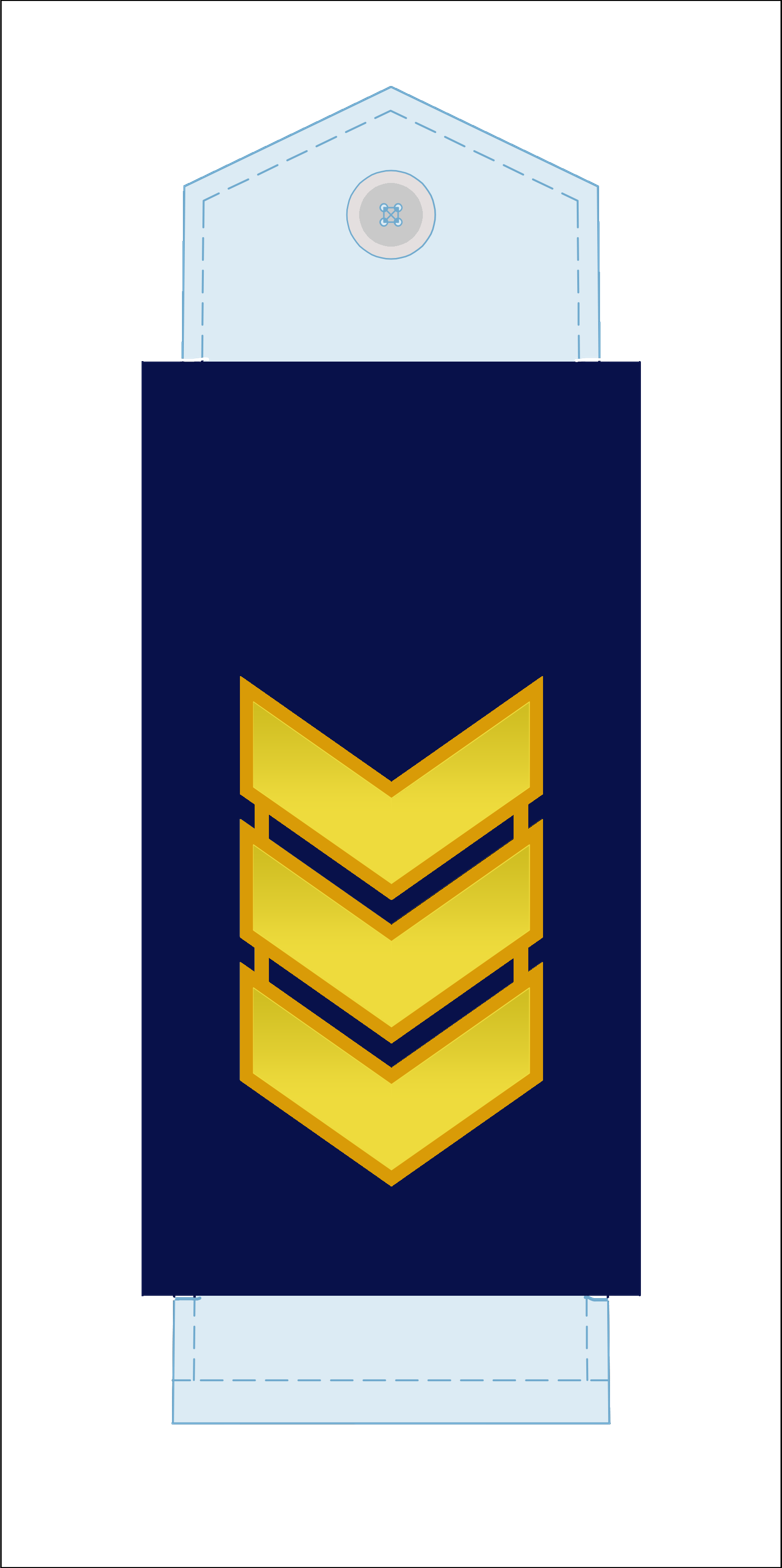
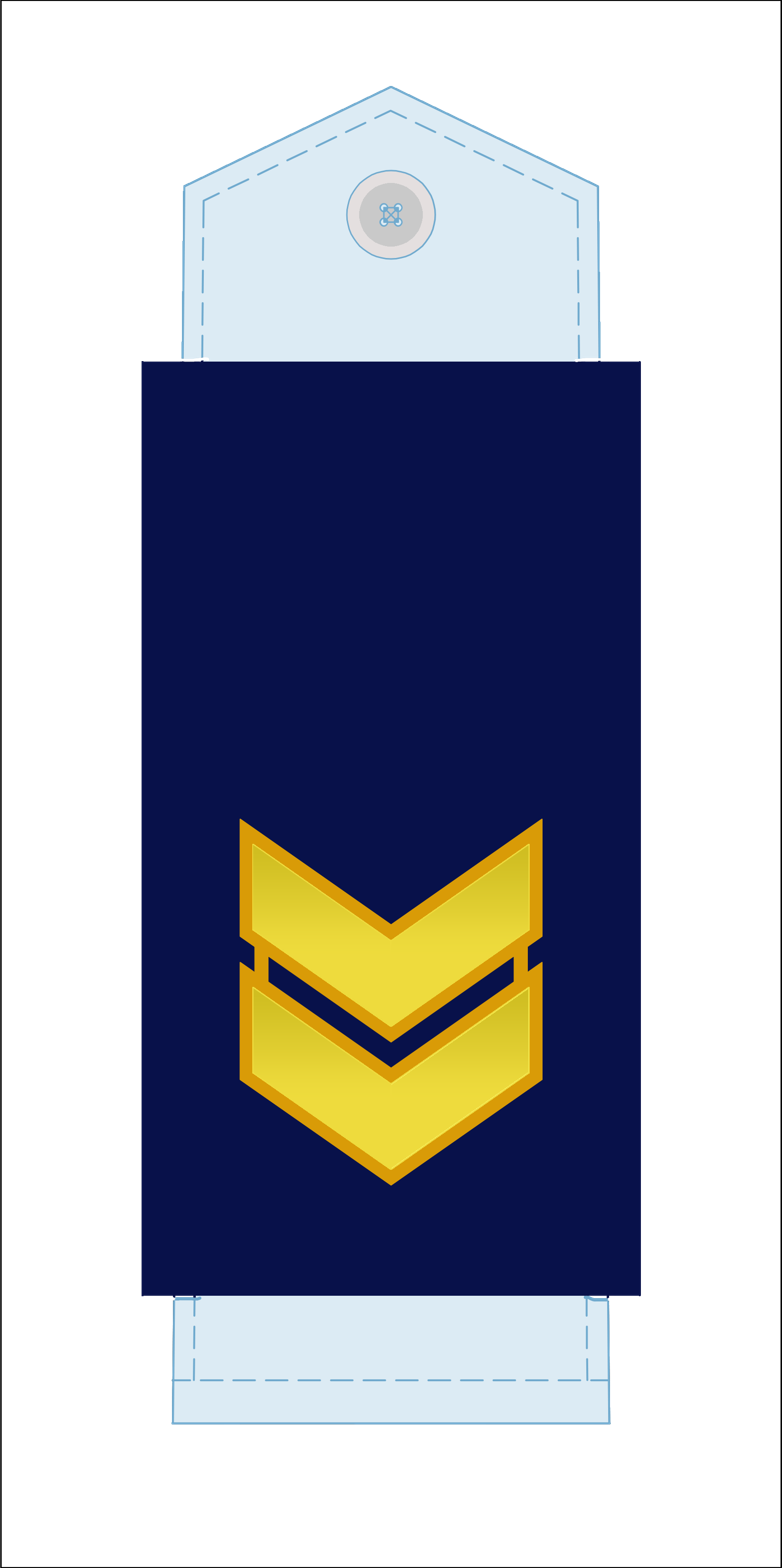
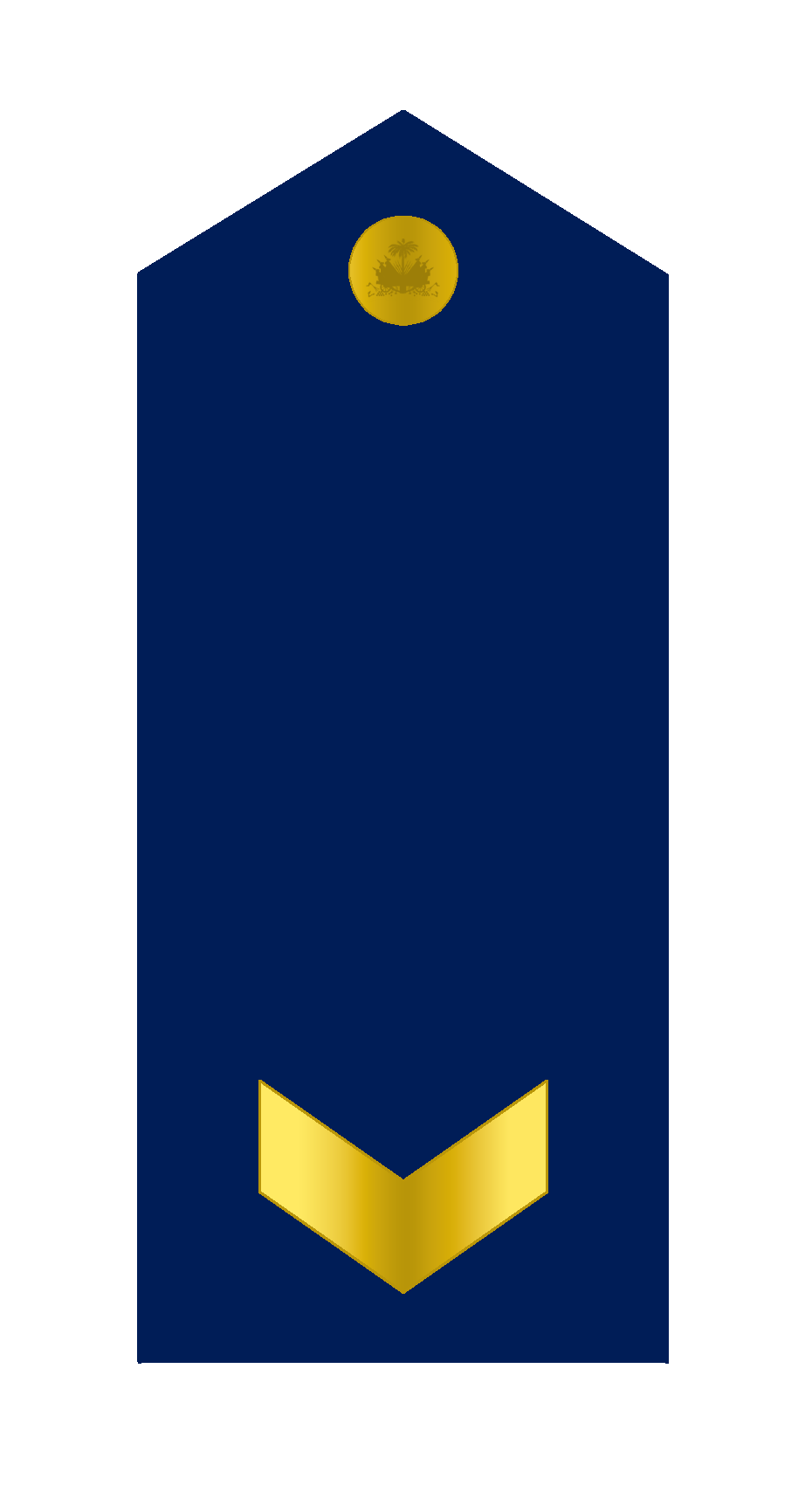
Rank group	General/flag officers			Senior officers			Junior officers
Haitian Army
Haitian Army	Lieutenant général	Major général	Général de brigade	Colonel	Lieutenant-colonel	Major	Capitaine	Lieutenant	Sous-lieutenant
Haitian Army	Lyetnan jeneral	Majò jeneral	Jeneral brigad	Kolonèl	Lyetnan kolonèl	Majò	Kapitèn	Lyetnan	Soulyetnan
Haitian Aviation Corps
Haitian Aviation Corps	Lieutenant général	Major général	Général de brigade	Colonel	Lieutenant-colonel	Major	Capitaine	Lieutenant	Sous-lieutenant
Haitian Aviation Corps	Lyetnan jeneral	Majò jeneral	Jeneral brigad	Kolonèl	Lyetnan kolonèl	Majò	Kapitèn	Lyetnan	Soulyetnan
Haitian Navy
Rank group	General/flag officers			Senior officers			Junior officers

==== Enlisted ====
The rank insignia of non-commissioned officers and enlisted personnel.

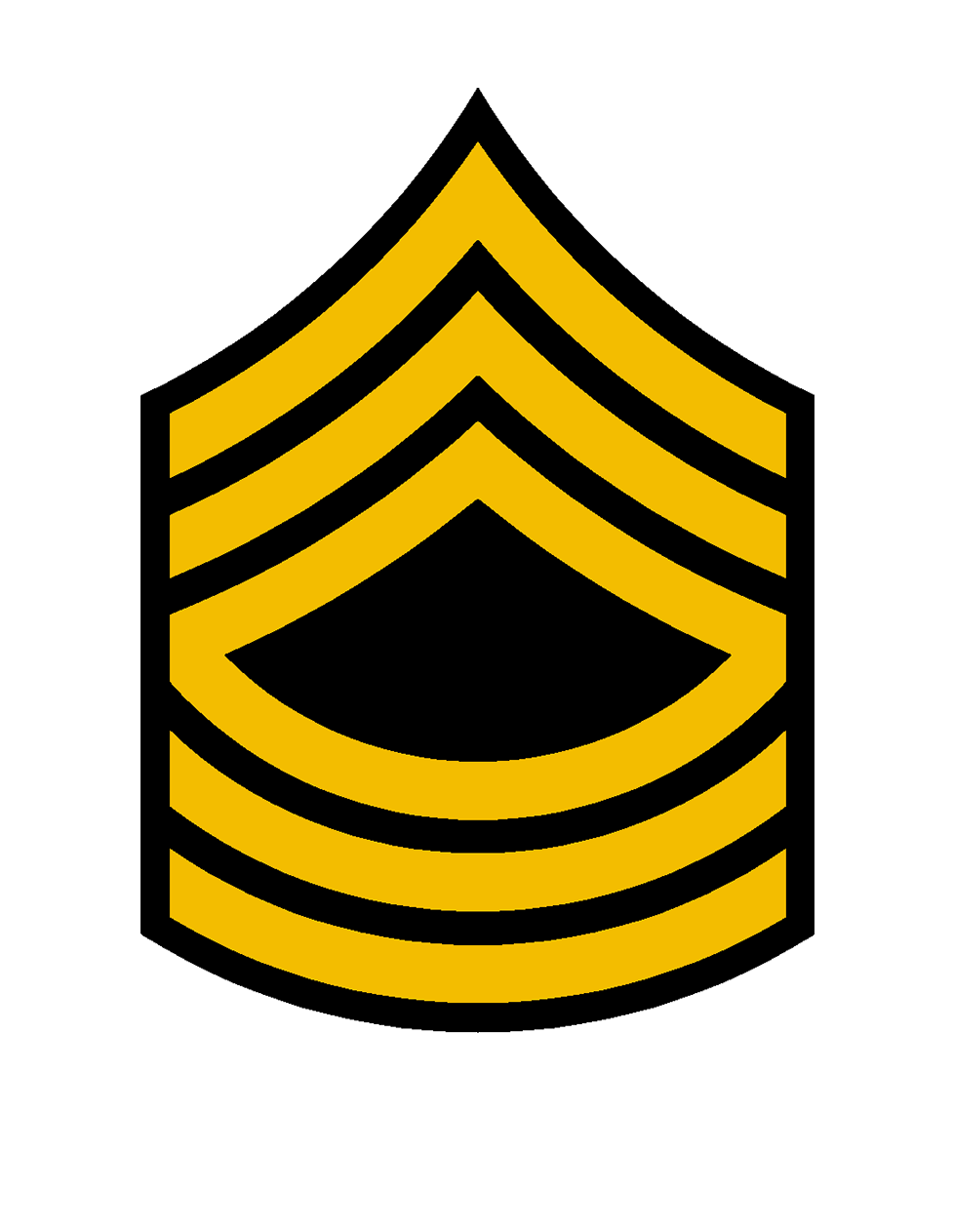
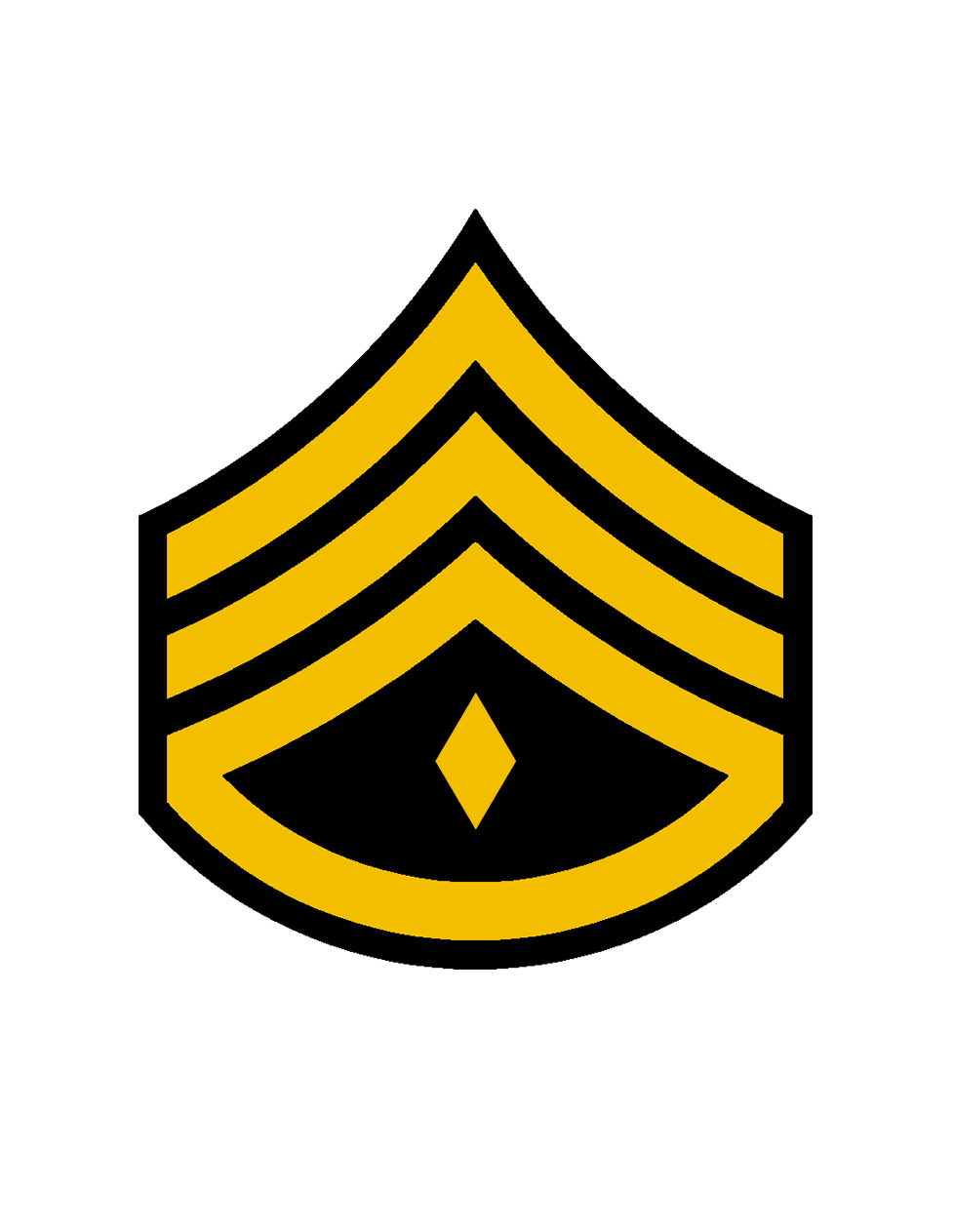
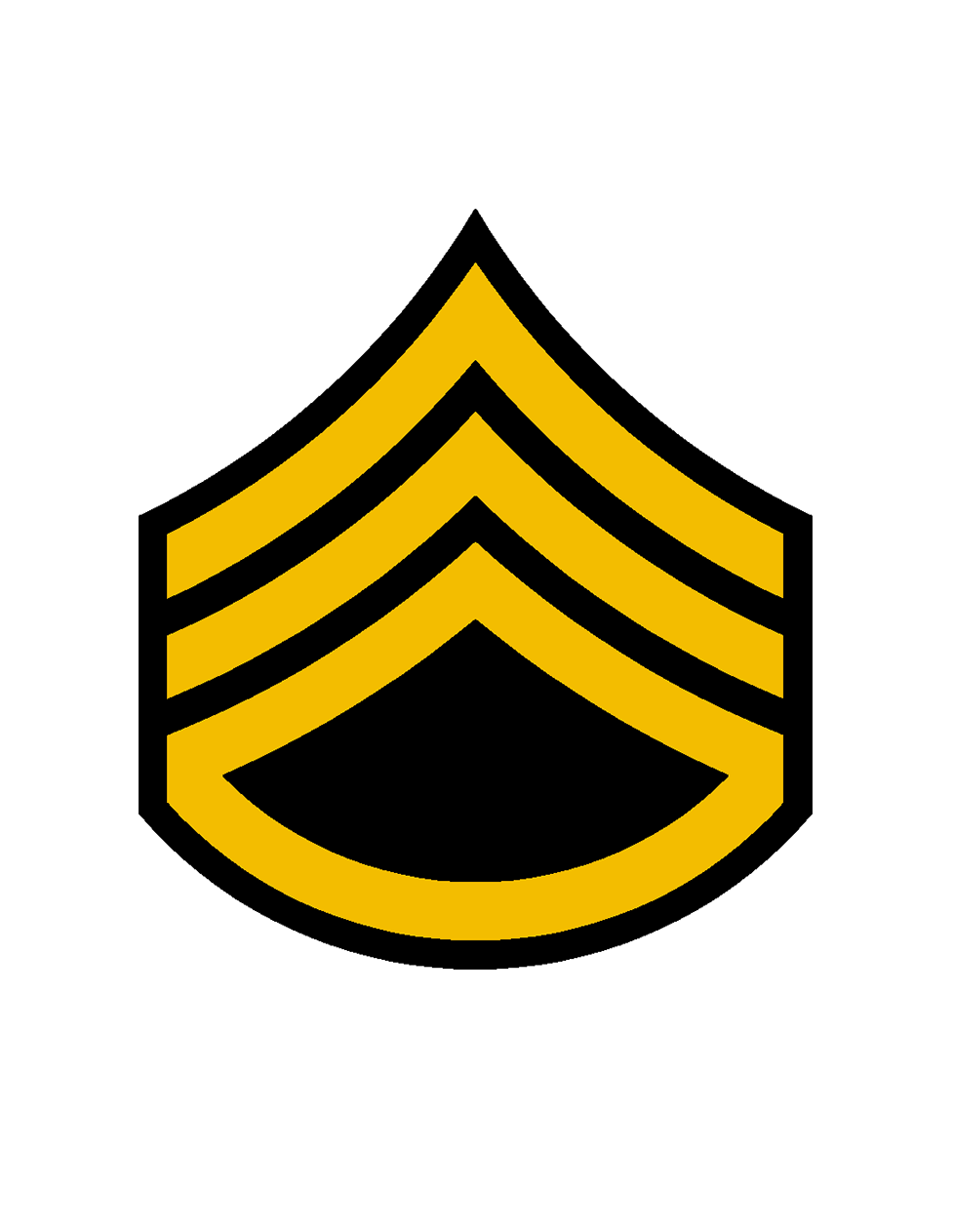
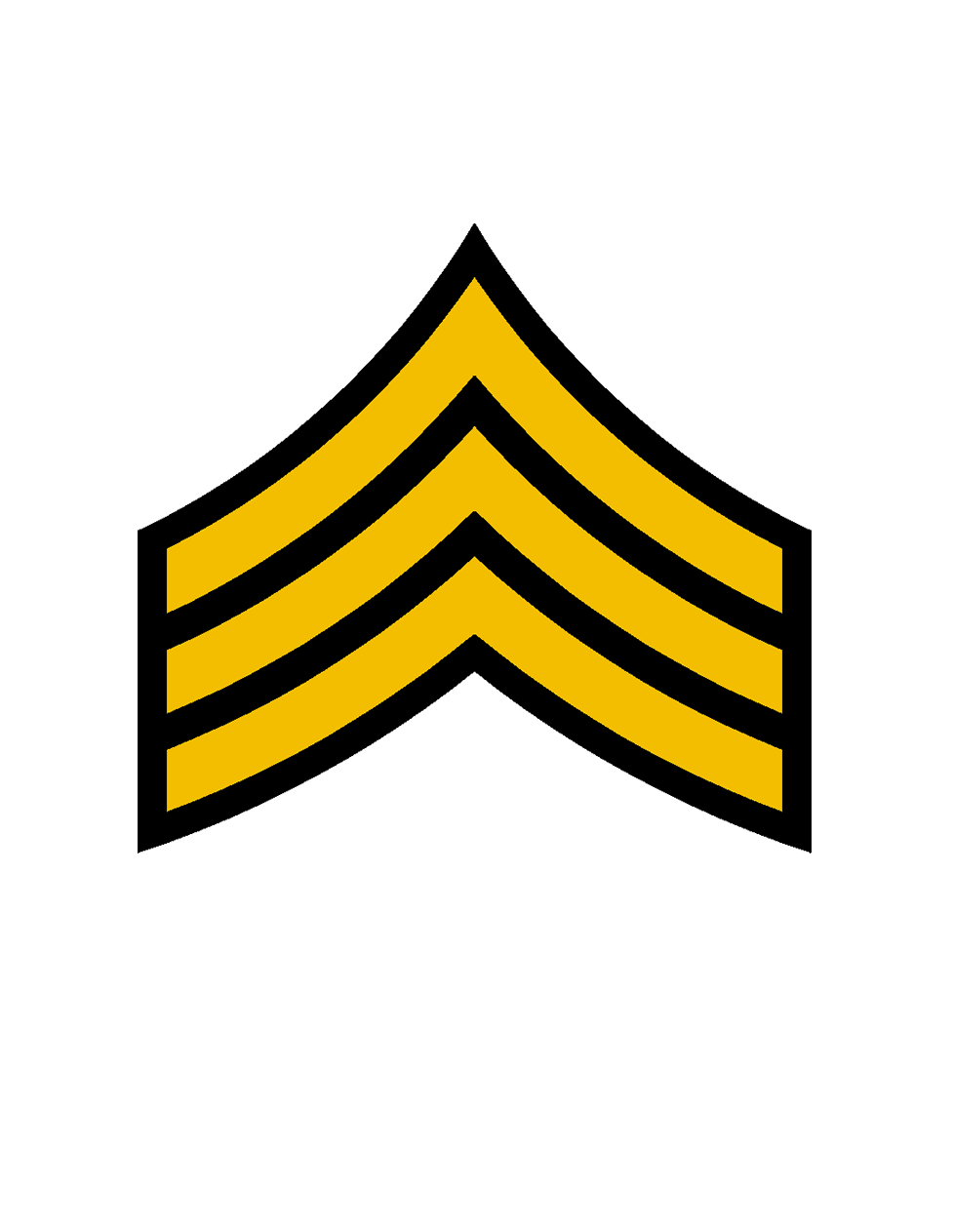
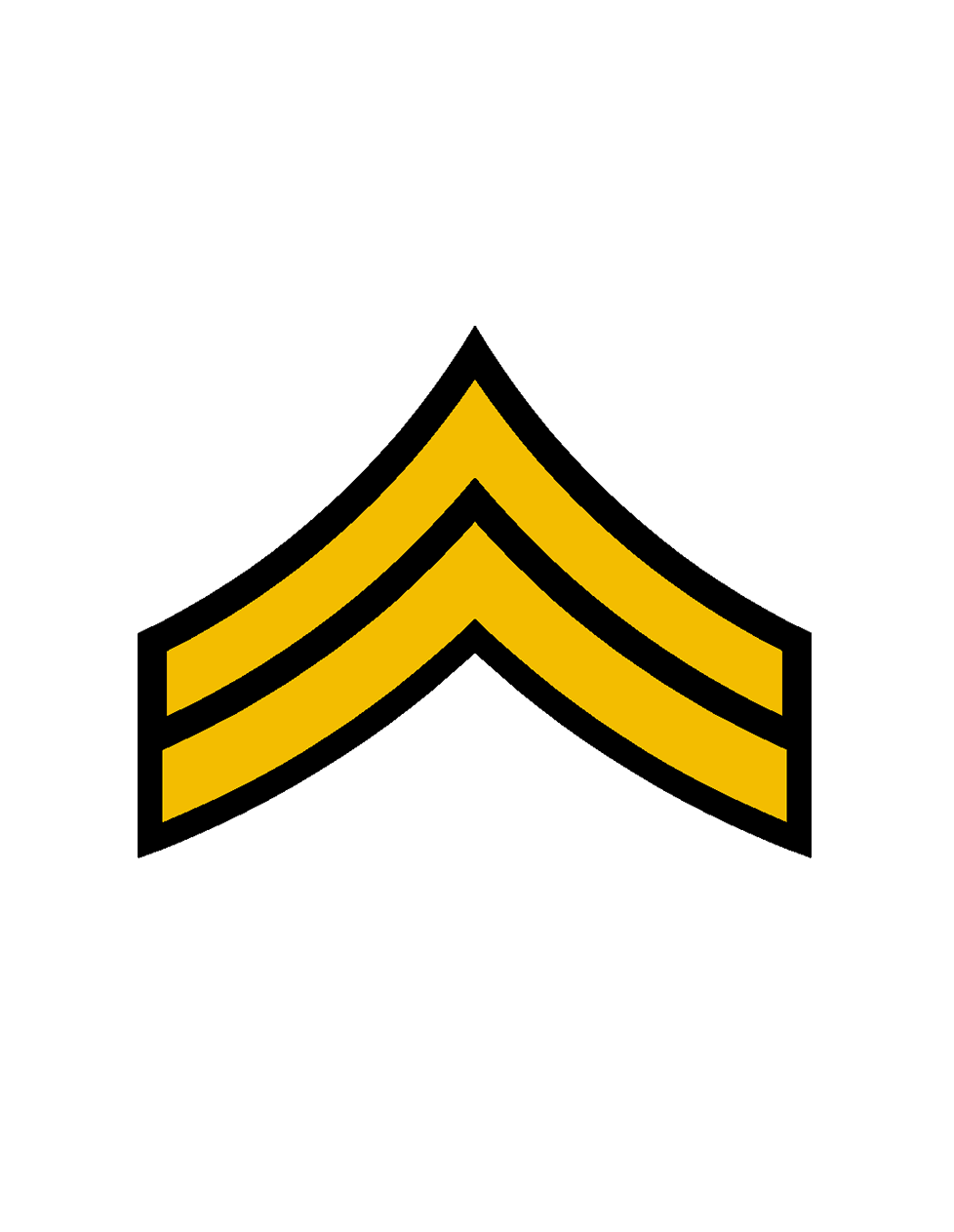
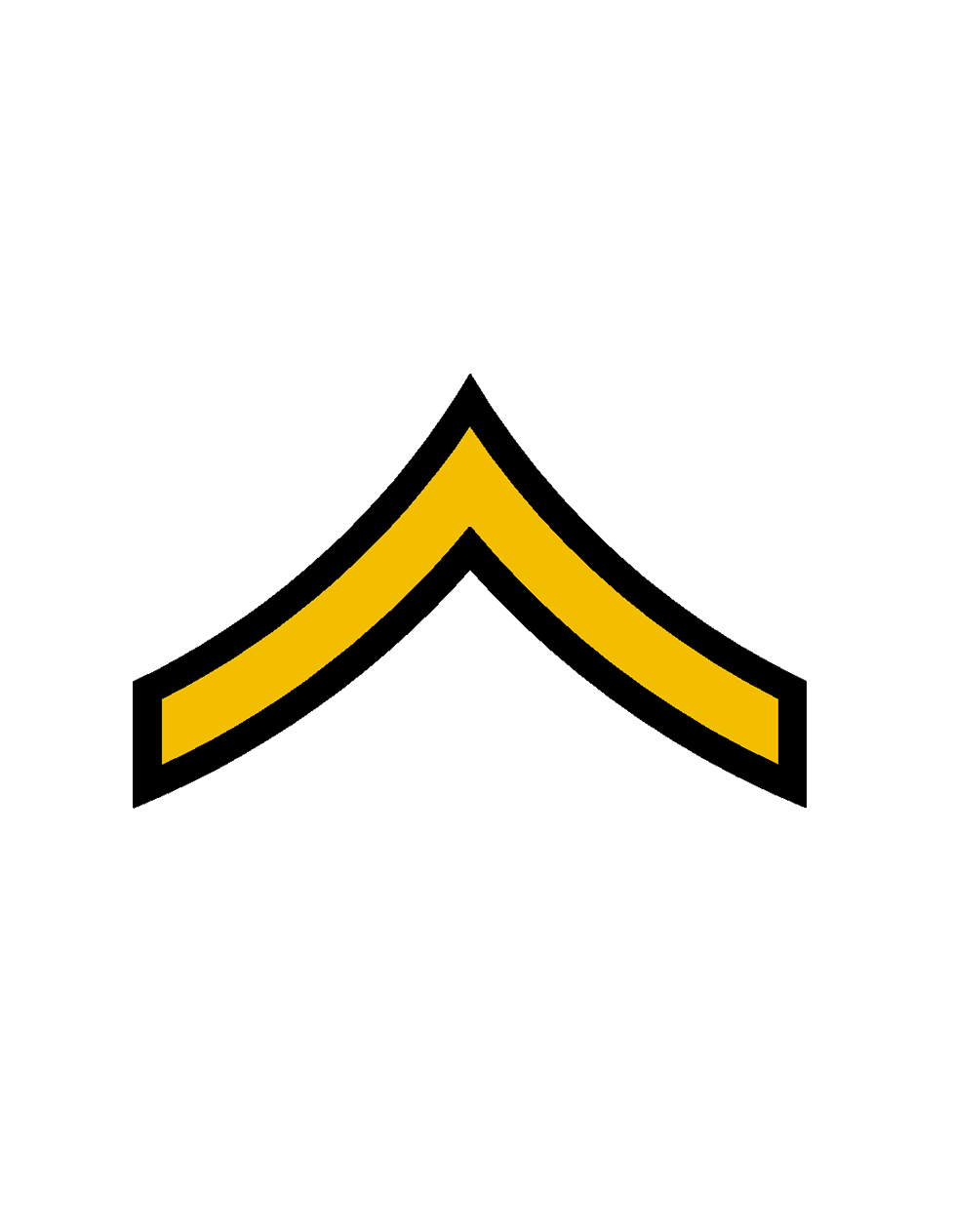
Rank group	Senior NCOs					Junior NCOs	Enlisted
Haitian Army								No insignia
Haitian Army	Adjutant	Sergent major	Premier sergent	Sergent-fourrier	Sergent	Caporal	Soldat de première classe	Soldat
Haitian Army	Adjitan	Sèjan majò	Premye sèjan	Sèjan-fourye	Sèjan	Kaporal	Sòlda premye klas	Sòlda
Haitian Aviation Corps
Haitian Navy
Rank group	Senior NCOs					Junior NCOs	Enlisted

== Deployments ==
=== Haitian Gang War (2024–present) ===
In March 2023, then Haitian Prime Minister Ariel Henry signaled that he wanted to mobilize the Haitian military to deal with rising gang related violence that has swept much of the country in the wake of the crisis. After the terrorist attacks on several prisons, including the Port-au-Prince prison (Pénitencier National), and several police stations the weekend of 2 March 2024, the Haitian military was deployed to the Toussaint Louverture International Airport to repel the gang assaults of 4 March 2024, defend and secure the airport. They were also task to protect the Bank of the Republic of Haiti and the port of Port-au-Prince. As of 27 August 2024, Prime Minister Conille confirmed that the Armed Forces were operating alongside the Haitian National Police and the Kenyan contingent of the Multinational Security Support Mission in Haiti, in the neighborhoods of Bel-Air and Solino.

The government intends to deploy elements to the Bay of Port-au-Prince to counter the gangs' attacks on port facilities and defend the water against piracy. On 4 October, it was confirmed that troops had deployed to the Artibonite department, in response to the Pont-Sondé massacre committed by the "Gran Grif" gang that resulted in over 70 deaths.

On 7 April 2026, the first battalion of troops deployed to the downtown Port-au-Prince area, as previously announced by Defense Minister Mario Andrésol. They are to support the National Police specialized units in the offensive against the gangs, then to hold, consolidate captured territory. A second battalion is scheduled to graduate not far after.

== Military equipment ==
=== Procurement ===
As of 2024, the military uses rifles donated by Taiwan and purchased from Brazil, such as assault rifles like the Taurus T4, from Brazil. The Haitian Armed Forces received it latest batch from the government on 4 September 2024, which arrived with Haitian foreign minister Dominique Dupuy after official visit to Brazil. In order to buy larger weapons and combat vehicles, discussions have been had to "move the lines" said an official source. Procurement has been a challenge for the Armed Forces since its reestablishment. The military is still subject to restrictions by the United States Department of State, with the Leahy Law still being in effect. This prohibits the United States from selling or giving any lethal equipment to the Haitian Military. This policy has put off many countries from selling lethal equipment to Haiti. Other miscellaneous small arms can be seen in the hands of soldiers.

The equipment of the National Equipment Center (CNE) were transferred to the Corps of Engineers, in the objective of reinforcing the military's capacities. On 4 September 2024, Prime Minister Conille supervised the delivery of material purchased by the government, including weapons, to the armed forces. The details and what the purchase included is not yet known.

The Haitian government plans on acquiring ships from Miami, including three 110-foot Island class patrol boat, to reinforce its maritime capacities in the defense of the bay and port of Port-au-Prince, and fight piracy activities along the metropolitan coastline.

Prime Minister Garry Conille traveled to the UAE with a delegation including AFH Brigadier General Emmanuel Azémar, at the invitation of his Emirati homologue, to negotiate the purchase of armoured personnel carriers, drones, weapons, and other military technologies from the United Arab Emirates, as well as technical assistance. The objective of these discussions are to establish a continuous flow of supply for the military, to increase its operational and logistical capabilities.

The Haitian government has been invited by Argentina and Colombia to pursue commercial defense contracts with their defense manufacturing firms.

A delegation of Haitian Army officers and staffers of the Ministry of Defense traveled to Brazil, specifically Rio de Janeiro, to attend LAAD Defence & Security 2025. They were seen talking to a representative at the Taurus Armas booth. Colombian Shipyard COTECMAR also confirmed they were in talks to provide for Haiti's naval needs.

The Haitian government is in talks with Colombian weapons manufacturer INDUMIL, confirmed by Colombian Defense Minister Pedro Arnulfo Sánchez. 1000 personal protection kits were given as military assistance to the Haitian military by Mexico, via the Mexican Agency of International Cooperation for Development (AMEXCID).

Currently there is an order of 4 MRAPs from the UAE, pending delivery.

== Partnerships and cooperation ==
=== Ecuador ===
The initial troops were formed in Ecuador between 2012 and 2017, during the Michel Martelly administration, as part of a cooperation accord between the two countries dating back to 2010, and revised in 2015. The soldiers of the Corps of Engineers (Corps du Génie, CORGE), were formed at the "Escuela Superior Militar Eloy Alfaro" in Quito, including 4 commissioned officers. Additionally, in 2015, 40 Commissioned Officers were formed at the "Escuela de Formación de Soldados Vencedores del Cenepa" in Ambato and 27 enlisted would obtain an 8 months formation at the "Escuela de Formación Militar de Santo Domingo de Los Colorados" in Santo Domingo, Ecuador.

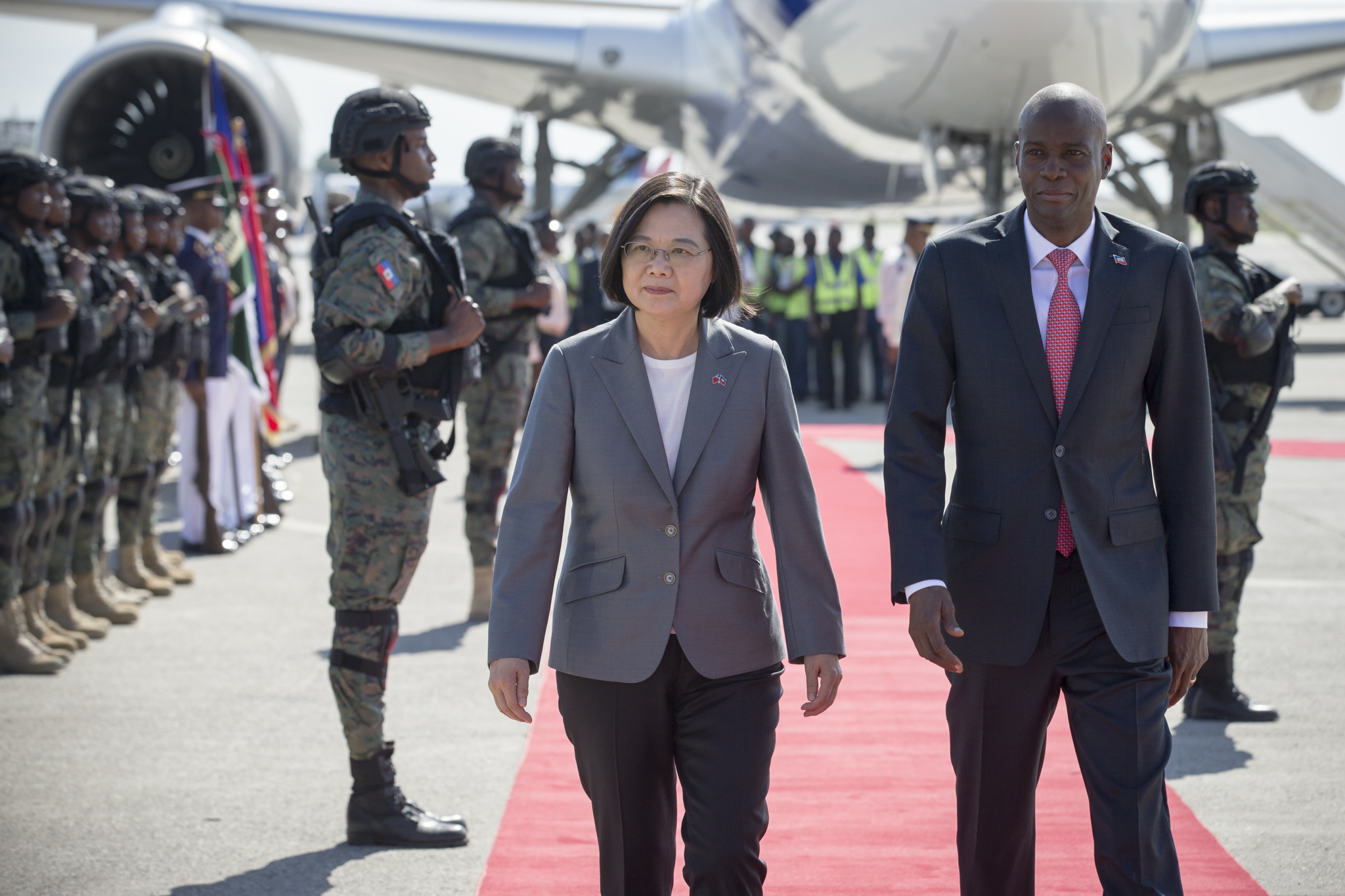
Haitian troops with donated T-91 rifles and personal protection equipment by Taiwan.

=== Taiwan ===
In 2019, Taiwan donated 100 sets of protection equipment and 100 T-91 rifles to the armed forces. In August 2024, another 100 personal protection kits were donated to the AFH via the Taiwan Embassy.

=== Mexico ===
Mexico is considered Haiti's biggest defense partner. A defense bilateral accord was signed on 5 October 2018 and renewed on 23 September 2023. The accord guarantees exchange of experience, training and cooperation in military education, disaster support activities and logistics. To this date, a total of 912 troops have been trained by Mexico. Two Haitian cadets are currently receiving training.

In 2019, The Mexican Secretariat of National Defense (SEDENA) provided a seminar on "Civil Protection, Human Rights and Gender Equality". 30 Mexican instructors led by Colonel Léon Borja, were deployed to Haiti to train 250 enlisted recruits, 50 NCO candidates, and 15 officer candidates at the Anacaona Military Training Center, in Léogâne. That was the first locally trained class of servicemen. The non-commissioned officers continued training at the "Escuela Militar de Sargentos" in Puebla and the officers were sent to the Temamatla military mase.

In 2022, NCOs were trained at the "Centro de Adiestramiento de Fuerzas Especiales" in Temamatla, Mexico to become instructors. Later, a company of 150 soldiers trained with the Mexican Army and Mexican National Guard on drone warfare, guerilla warfare, sniper training, and demolition. That company would become the National Guard Unit (Unité de Garde Nationale). Between 2022 and 2023, 130 servicemen received special operations training from the Cuerpo de Fuerzas Especiales, becoming the first Special forces unit of the new AFH.

Mexico will assist the FAD'H in the construction of training facilities. In the meantime, they would be welcoming and providing training for 700 recruits, in groups of 150. On 24 July 2025, the first group of 150 recruits departed to Mexico for 2-months long training course and 1000 personal protection kits were donated to the Haitian military, courtesy of the AMEXCID. That group graduated and returned to Haiti on 20 September, with additional military aid.

Minister Andresol announced that by July 2026, 200 of the next class of recruits will be sent to Mexico for basic training, in complement to the 443 who will remain in Haiti.

=== Argentina ===
Argentina has been providing scholarship to Haitian cadets to attend their military academies. As of now, only the Escuela Naval Militar and the Escuela de Aviación Militar have hosted cadets, at both officer and non-commissioned officer level. On 16 March 2023, Ambassador Vilbert Bélizaire and Brigadier General Xavier Isaac signed a cooperation protocol between the Armed Forces of the Argentine Republic and the Armed Force of Haiti, formalizing a program of training and technical assistance from the Escuela de Aviacion to the AFH.

There have been discussions to establish a formal military cooperation accord between the two countries. On 22 August 2024, the chargé d'affaires of Haiti to Argentina, Olga Ducasse, met with Brigadier general Xavier Isaac, Chief of the Joint Chiefs of Staff of the Armed Forces of the Argentine Republic, to discuss the advancements of military cooperation between Haiti and Argentina.

Defense minister Berthier Antoine met with his Argentine homologue, Luis Petri, at the XVI Conference of Defense Minister in the Americas (CDMA), on 16 October 2024, where talks were had over existing military cooperation and defense partnership, and over new ways to expand them. He let know that an increasing number of Haitian servicemembers would benefit from training from Argentine Forces and military academies. He also told Le Nouvelliste that Argentina would be providing non-lethal equipment to the Haitian military, and are open to commercial partnerships in order to provide lethal equipment.

On June 1, 2026, Minister of Defense Mario Andrésol hosted newly appointed chargé d'affaires Pablo Graziano for a work meeting to relaunch and deepen military, defense cooperation. Mr. Graziano communicated Argentina's readiness to host Haitian cadets at its land (Colegio Militar de la Nación), sea (Escuela Naval Militar), and air (Escuela de Aviación Militar) military academies. Another subject matter was the integration of the Haitian military into the regional defense and security mechanism.

=== Brazil ===
As of 2025, Brazil is the largest supplier of small arms to the Armed Forces of Haiti. The standard issue rifle of the army in the Taurus T4 rifle and the main service pistol, the Taurus TH9 both by Taurus Armas. Other equipment like grenade launcher and grenades are acquired from Condor Tecnologias Não-Letais.

The armed forces frequently attend LAAD Defence & Security Expo in Rio de Janeiro. Talks are ongoing over prospects for military cooperation.

Brazil will send military instructors to support strengthening efforts of the Haitian armed forces, including the Corps of Engineers, confirmed by Ambassador Luis Guilherme Nascentes da Silva, reaffirming is country's commitment. In a May 20 meeting between Minister Andresol and Ambassador da Silva, talks were held over strengthening cooperation between both nations, particularly around the training of new NCOs, commissioned offers and General Staff cadres. A meeting with the Brazilian counterpart is planned at the upcoming Conference of Defense Ministers of the Americas (CDMA) in Peru, in July 2026.

=== France ===
The Armed Forces of Haiti have an operational military partnership program with French Armed Forces, codenamed "SABRE Haiti". So far, as part of the partnership, the Haitian Army, trains with the 33rd Marine Infantry Regiment of the French Army (33e RIMa). The exercises take place at the French Forces in the Antilles (Forces Armées aux Antilles) headquarters in Fort-de-France, Martinique, and cover specialties related to Haiti's current security challenges such as urban warfare, open area combat, combat rescue & first aid, weapon handling, familiarization of the FAMAS, hand to hand combat, vehicle searches and other techniques. After the first session, the accord was renewed and expanded, an announcement made by French Minister of Foreign Affairs Jean-Noël Barrot in front of the French Senate. As of July 2026, 6 sessions have taken place, with over 125 soldiers havin benefited from advanced training.

Lt. Gen. Guerrier led a military delegation in the 2026 edition of Eurosatory, where they met with global defense leaders. The French government has explicitly invited the Haitian government to consider the France's defense industry for military acquisitions.

=== Benin ===
On 11 January 2025, a defense memorandum of understanding was signed by both parties that included military training, Intelligence sharing, joint military exercises, and military assistance in the event of threats in or to either nations.

=== Colombia ===
A defense cooperation accord was signed on 22 January 2025 by Haitian and Colombian Defense Ministries. The terms of the accord were finalized on 18 July 2025. Colombia and the Military Forces of Colombia will take charge of training 1000 Haitian recruits, similar to the arrangement between Haiti and Mexico. 500 will be trained by the National Army of Colombia, 250 by the Colombian Navy, and 250 by the Colombian Aerospace Force. The training will take place in Colombia due to lack of adequate training facilities in Haiti at the moment. 200 are expected to travel to Colombia in the second half of 2025, to be ready for deployment once completing their 3 months of training.

The Haitian government is in talks with Colombian weapons manufacturer INDUMIL, confirmed by Colombian Defense minister Pedro Arnulfo Sánchez. On 16 December 2024, Minister Moise and Lt. Gen. Guerrier visited the COTECMAR shipyard in Cartagena to observe the shipbuilding operations. COTECMAR confirmed they were in talks to provide for Haiti's naval needs after a meeting at LAAD Defence & Security 2025 with a delegation of military officers and members of the ministry of defense, in Rio de Janeiro, Brazil.

=== Canada ===
Defense Minister Berthier Antoine, would meet with the Ambassador of Canada, André François Giroux, on 9 September 2024, over cooperation and partnership on the matters of defense. Later on, at the CDMA in Argentina, he had an exchange with Canadian Defence Minister Bill Blair over the same subject.

=== United States ===
After the Haitian military successfully repelled terrorist attacks on Toussaint Louverture International Airport on the afternoon of 4 March 2024 and helped secure it, the United States Department of State stated, although it had not changed its general policy on the Haitian military, it provided non-lethal aid to the Armed Forces of Haiti.

Haitian Defense Minister Jean-Michel Moïse welcomed Ambassador Hankins and Major Tripp Callaway this his offices on 30 December 2024, for discussions rooted in the modernization & reinforcing of the AFH. They discussed the integration of the Haitian military into the State Partnership Program with the Louisiana National Guard (initiated in 2011) to reinforce operational capacities, promote technical and strategic subject matter exchange. Lieutenant (ret.) Emmanuel Paul, then chief of staff of the Defense Minister's cabinet, told Le Nouvelliste that the United States were willing to strengthen partnership with the Haitian military, particularly with training, as well as military aid (lethal and nonlethal), to respond to the security woes of the country. As of July 2025, there have been no changes to the United States' policies toward the Haitian military, although there is a bipartisan bill introduced to assess the importance of providing American support.

In UNSC Resolution 2793(2025), co-penned by the United States, the AFH were mentioned by name. As opposed to the Multinational Security Support Mission in Haiti, the mandate of the Gang Suppression Force (GSF) permits it to collaborate, operate with, and support the Haitian Armed Forces.

The budget law H.R.7148 - Consolidated Appropriations Act, 2026, voted into law on 3 February 2026, will make "...up to $5,000,000 may be made available for non-lethal assistance and operational support for the Haitian Armed Forces, following consultation with the appropriate congressional committees." This would constitute a major breakthrough in military cooperation, defense partnership between Haiti and the United States, a first since the early 90s. A few days prior, Defense Minister Moïse met with defense attaché Lt. Col. Jay Richardson and Army attaché Major Michael Rea, both from the United States Army and attached to the U.S. Embassy in Haiti, to discuss and reinforce common interest in stability in Haiti and the Caribbean basin.

Since his appointment, Defense Minister Mario Andresol met with the military attachés of the American Embassy in Haiti multiple times, twice hosting Army Attaché Major Micheal Rea and Lt. Col. Hans Carnice (United States Marine Corps) to his office to discuss building and strengthening defense partnership between Haiti and the US, prioritizing training and technical assistance to build up operational capacities. The US government provided a tactical shooting range to the "Vertières" military base which also hosts contingents of the Gang Suppression Force. In May 2026, Deputy Secretary of State Christopher Landau visited the "Vertieres" base of the FAd'H during his short visit to Port-au-Prince, where he was received by the commander in chief Lt. Gen. Derby Guerrier.

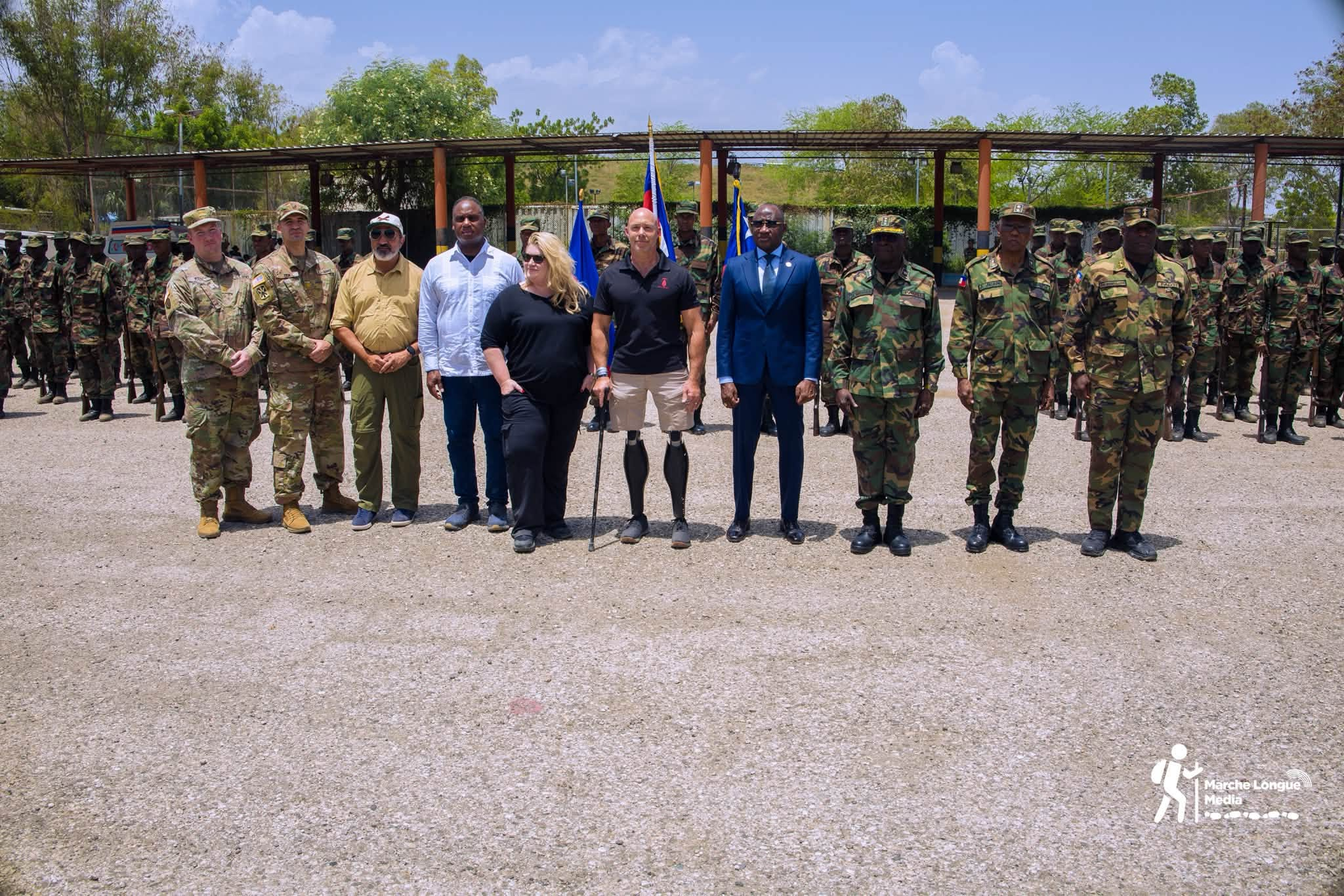
CODEL led by Rep. Brian Mast, with Defense Minister Andresol, and FAd'H Commander in chief, Lt. Gen. Guerrier, at the Vertières Military Base

A U.S. Congress Delegation (CODEL), led by Congressman Brian Mast, visited the Vertières military base on July 27 2026. There Minister Andresol presented the plans for modernization of the armed forces.

=== Organization of American States ===
A meeting between the Haitian ministry of defense and 15 member states of the Organization of American States was initiated by the permanent mission of Haiti to the OAS to call for the support of the international community to improve the security situation in the country. After the meeting, the defense minister Berthier Antoine announced a 5-year plan to recruit 20,000 troops. The OAS intend to support this plan via technical cooperation; a commission will coordinate and supervise the process of training officers, non-commissioned officers, and soldiers. A delegation led by Presidential council member Smith Augustin met with OAS secretary general Luis Almagro, and the Executive council of the Inter-American Defense Board to call for support to the capacities and modernization efforts of the Armed Forces.

The AFH had an officer graduate from the Inter-American Defense College's (IADC) Class 65.

During the 56th General Assembly of the Organization of American States (OAS), the leadership of the IADB met with the Haitian Minister of Foreign Affairs, Raina Forbin, to discuss new areas of cooperation in security and defense. During that meeting, the training of the Haitian military was set as a priority, through seminars, training and mentoring programs that the IADB organizes for military personnel of member states.

=== Others ===
==== Spain ====
In 2021, talks were held between Dr. Louis Marie Montfort Saintil, the Ambassador of Haiti in Spain, and Colonel Carlos Sanchez Bas of the Spanish Air and Space Force in the objectives of exploring avenues of cooperation, more precisely in the field of reorganization and modernization of the Aeronautical Corps of the Armed Forces of Haiti.

==== United Arab Emirates ====
Emirati Vice President Mansour bin Zayed Al Nahyan invited Haitian Prime Minister Conille to visit the United Arab Emirates, where he and his delegation including Chief of the High Staff Brigadier general Emmanuel Azémar, inspected potential material and equipment required by the armed forces. He was also introduced to security and defense experts, who could provide training and technical assistance on the matters of surveillance and intelligence. The PM stated that an accord of cooperation was almost done, to streamline the procurement of drones, armored vehicles, weapons, munitions, and spare parts for the security forces. There have been no mentions of this deal after Conille was fired in November 2024.

There is an order of 4 APCs from the UAE pending delivery.

== Gallery ==
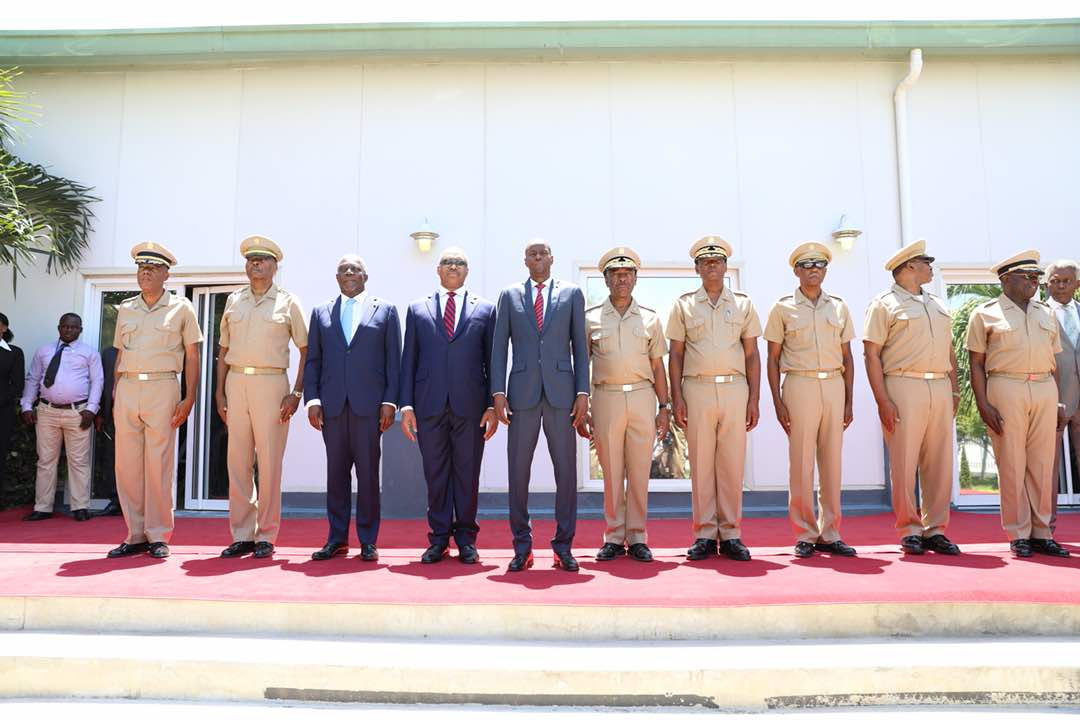
Installation of the Chiefs of Staff of the remobilized Armed Forces in 2018

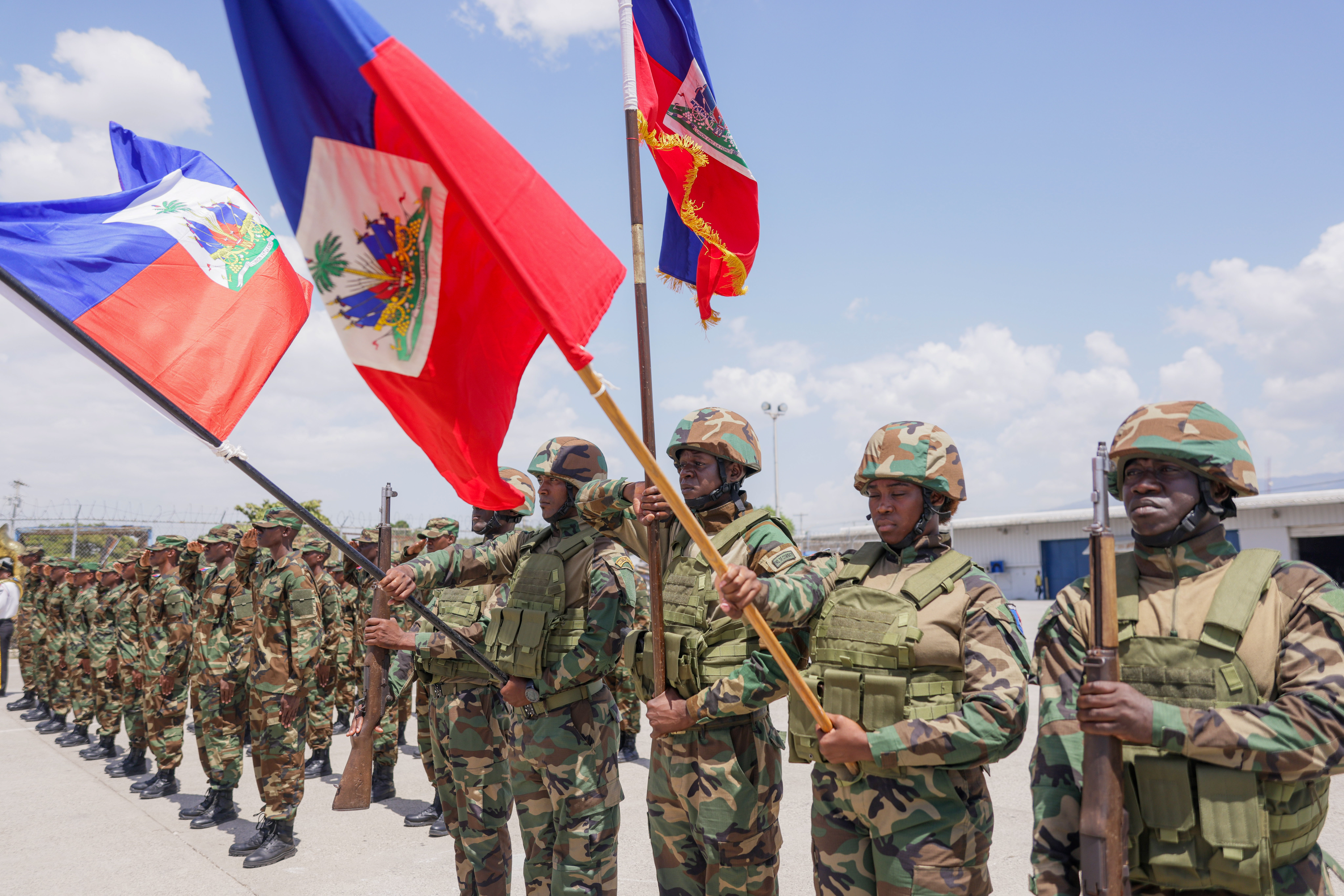
Haitian troops receiving Colombian President Petro

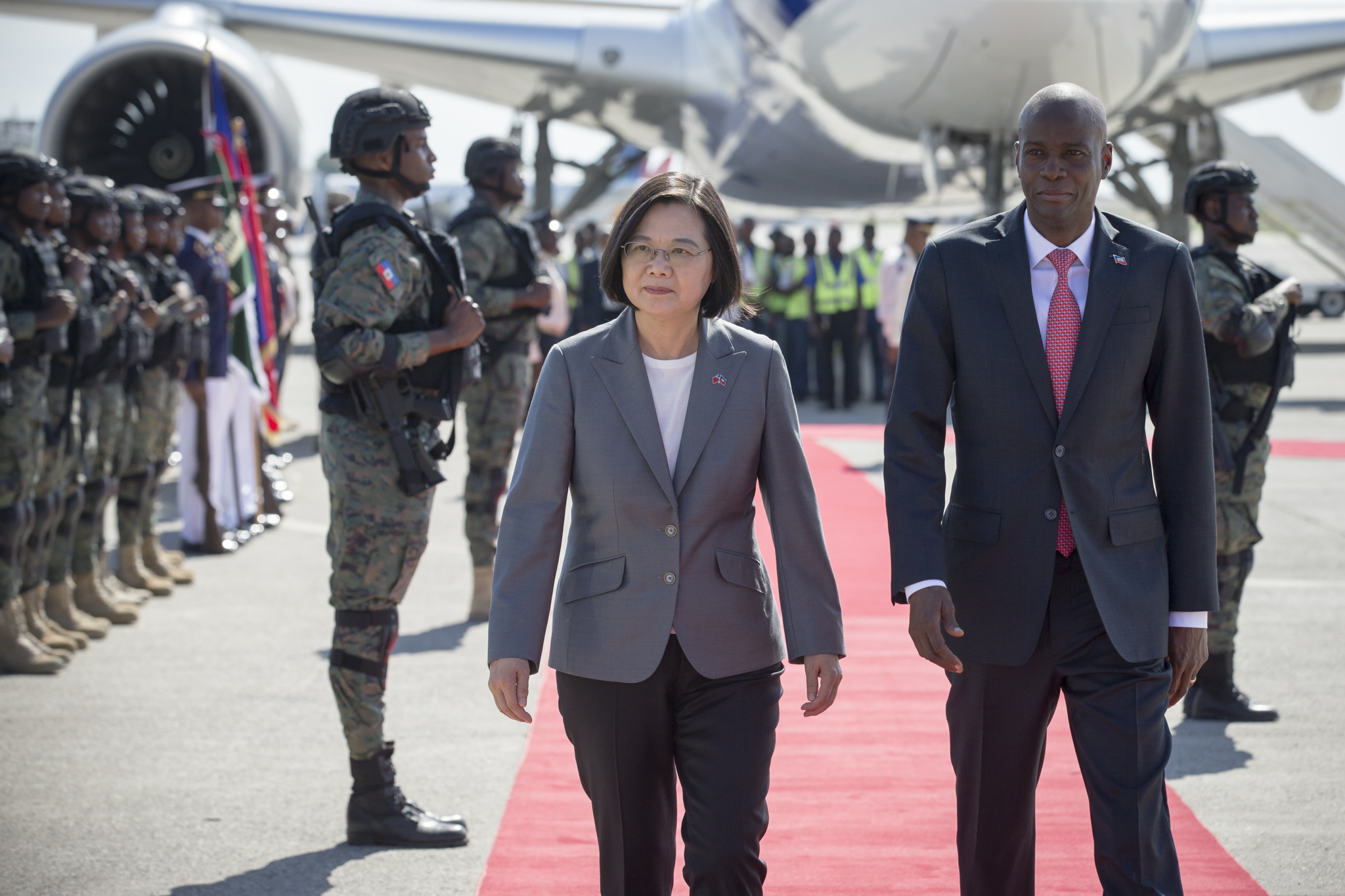
Haitian troops receiving Taiwanese president Tsai Ing-wen

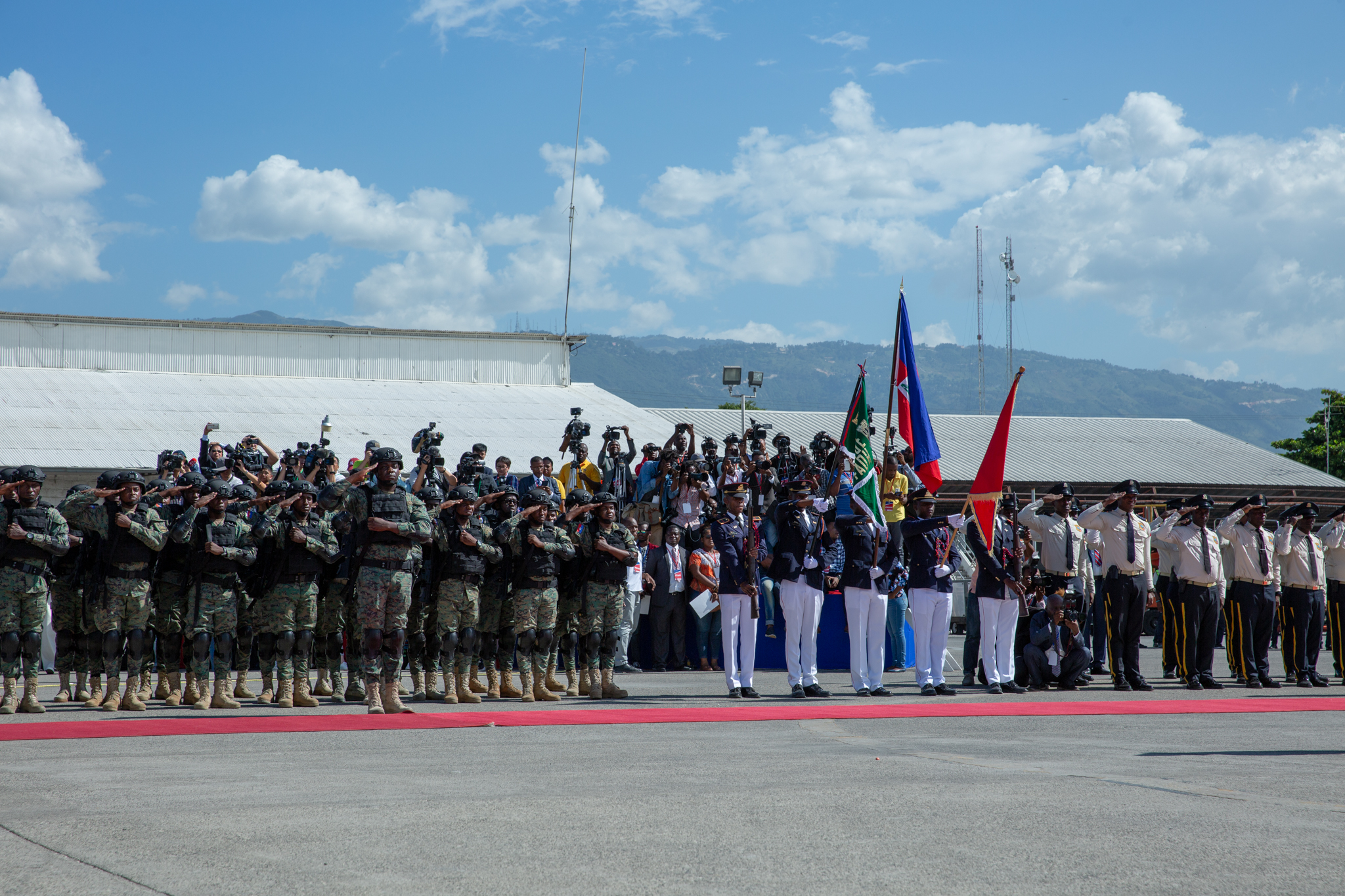

== See also ==
- Military history of Haiti
- List of commanders-in-chief of the Armed Forces of Haiti
- Haitian Army
- Haitian Aviation Corps
- Tonton Macoute
- Gendarmerie of Haiti
