= 1970 Haitian coup attempt =

Politico-military crisis in Haiti

1970 Haitian coup d'état attempt
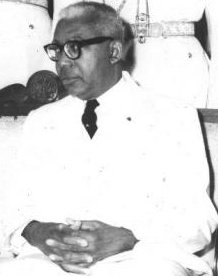
- President François Duvalier, target of the Cayard mutiny.
Date	24 April 1970
Location	Port-au-Prince, Haiti
Status	President Duvalier remained in power until his death in 1971.

Belligerents
(Haiti) Haitian government	(Haiti) Dissident faction of the Coast Guard

Commanders and leaders
(Haiti) François Duvalier	(Haiti) Octave Cayard

Units involved
Armed Forces of Haiti; Presidential Guard; Dessalines Battalion; Port-au-Prince Police; Tonton Macoute; National Security Volunteer Corps	Haitian Coast Guard

Strength
Armed forces: 5,185 men; Presidential Guard: 400 men; Dessalines Battalion: 800 men; Port-au-Prince Police: 800 men; Tonton Macoute: 1,500 men; National Security Volunteer Corps: 5,000 - 7,000 men	Coast Guard: 118 men; 1 surface craft (GC-10); 2 patrol craft
- The Coast Guard flagship, GC–10, had a 76 mm cannon and 20 and 40 mm AA guns.; Majority of the Coast Guard was loyal to Col. Octave Cayard.; Only three of the six minor surface craft of the Coast Guard were operational.

The 1970 Haitian coup attempt, also known as the Cayard affair, was a failed coup d'état by dissident elements of the Haitian Coast Guard, led by Colonel and Coast Guard Commandant Octave Cayard, against the François Duvalier dictatorship. Hastily executed, the coup attempt was prompted by government crackdowns that rounded up alleged coup plotters, making the conspirators believe government authorities were close to discovering their plans, thus the desperate move.

Rather than obey orders from above to surrender some of his men suspected of being involved in his seditionist plot, Cayard instead defied them and finally initiated the planned coup attempt on April 24. At 9 AM, Cayard declared in a telephone call the seizure of the coast guard's largest vessels, including the GC-10, which was equipped with a 76 mm (3 in) cannon and armed with 20 mm (0.79 in) and 40 mm (1.6 in) anti-aircraft (AA) guns. Two other vessels were seized as well, both being small surface craft armed with AA guns of questionable quality. At 11:44 AM, the GC-10, the only ship with effective weaponry, began shelling the presidential palace from its position in the bay, firing at least eleven rounds. Only one of the rounds hit the palace. Aiming to initiate a larger rebellion, the uprising hoped for by the colonel did not materialize as the staunchly loyal armed forces showed no signs of dissent throughout the coup attempt. After having spent the whole day attacking the palace, Colonel Cayard along with his 118 men decided to sail to the United States Naval Base at Guantanamo Bay, Cuba. Their properties were later confiscated by the government, with the Tontons Macoutes ransacking the colonel's home and a printing company in which he was a shareholder of, seizing approximately $150,000 worth of equipment.

The abortive mutiny by the Haitian Coast Guard is considered the last of several coup attempts against President François Duvalier that began with the 1958's Pasquet affair. On April 21, 1971, Duvalier died and was succeeded by his son Jean-Claude Duvalier.

After the coup attempt, Cayard became a legendary figure among the Haitian people for his daring actions as Coast Guard Commander in opposing the Duvalier regime. Upon the colonel's return to Haiti in 1986 following the collapse of the regime, he was warmly welcomed by the public. Cayard expressed his desire to join the army and run for office yet was unsure about the exact path he would pursue.
