= Kern Delince =

Haitian-American military officer, lawyer and author

Social Scientist and Economist United States, Haiti

Personal details
- Born: Kern Delince; November 27, 1923 Jacmel, Haiti
- Died: December 30, 2016 (aged 93) New York City, United States
- Spouse: Marie-Elaine Viard Delince
- Profession: military officer, author, political scientist, economist, librarian

Kern Delince (November 27, 1923 – December 30, 2016) was a Haitian-born military officer, lawyer, author, political scientist, economist, and librarian. As a lieutenant colonel in the Haitian Army, he participated in a failed 1963 coup attempt against Haitian President François Duvalier. He thereafter found political asylum in the United States. Delince authored four books on Haitian politics and commented frequently on Haitian political developments.

== Early life ==
Delince was born in 1923 in the southern seaside town of Jacmel, Haiti. He began a 20-year career with the Haitian Army in 1945. In 1953, Delince graduated from the University of Haiti in Port-au-Prince with degrees in law and economics. He was educated overseas from 1958 to 1961, spending one year studying psychology at the University of Mexico and two years at the University of Paris Institute of Psychology and Institute of Political Studies, receiving certificates in psychology and in political science, respectively.

== Coup attempt and flight to the United States ==
Francois Duvalier became President of Haiti in 1957 and thereafter consolidated power, becoming the country's brutal dictator. He survived a 1958 coup attempt. In April 1963, Delince, then an army lieutenant colonel, joined other military plotters in a second coup attempt. The other officers included Col. Lionel Honorat, Second Lieutenant Roland Magloire, and former officer Fritz LaMothe. The coup failed, resulting in death sentences for the officers. Delince and the other conspirators fled under cover of night with their families to seek asylum at the Brazilian Embassy in Port-au-Prince.

After several weeks, the government granted safe passage out of the country to the officers’ wives and one child, but denied passage to the officers. After nearly 20 months of international pressure, the government yielded, allowing the officers to leave for Brazil. On November 30, 1964, the officers arrived in Rio de Janeiro under Brazilian government guard. The Brazilian authorities detained Delince and the others on Ilha das Flores, an island near Rio de Janeiro.

Shortly thereafter, Delince made an early morning escape from the island by convincing a fisherman to take him ashore. He hid briefly in Rio before finding safe passage out of Brazil through a series of intermediaries. On January 27, 1965, Delince boarded a Pan American flight to John F. Kennedy International Airport in New York, where he rejoined his wife and son Patrick. Delince's other children stayed in Haiti with relatives until they could leave the country years later. Delince lived in New York City until the early 1990s, retired to Plantation, Florida, then returned to New York in 2013 for the remainder of his life.

== Subsequent career and scholarly work ==
In 1967, Delince earned a master's degree in library science from Columbia University. He began work in 1968 as a professional librarian with the Brooklyn Public Library, retiring in 1989.

Delince wrote four well-received and internationally reviewed books on Haitian politics, economics, and military history. Paul Laraque, a noted Haitian former military officer, poet, and activist known for his surrealist, political poetry, provided the preface to Delince's first book, published in 1979. Delince published his final text in 2000.

Throughout his time in New York, Delince frequently commented on Haitian political developments for The New York Times.

== Personal life ==
Delince died on December 30, 2016, at age 93 at his Rego Park, New York home, following several years of health issues including prostate cancer and Alzheimer's disease. He was survived by his wife, Marie-Elaine Viard Delince, two sons, Jean-Robert and J. Patrick, and two daughters, Marlene and Karen, all of whom live in New York City. He was also survived by his sister, Mireille Delince, who lives in Paris, France, as well as ten grandchildren and seven great-grandchildren.

== Publications ==
Delince published four books:

- Armee et Politique en Haiti. Paris: L'Harmattan. 1979.
- Les Forces Politiques en Haiti. Paris: Karthala Editions. 1993. ISBN 9782865373956.
- Quelle Armee Pour Haiti?: Militarisme et Démocratie. Paris: Karthala Editions. 1994. ISBN 9782865375110.
- L'insuffisance de Developpement en Haiti. Plantation, FL: Pegasus Books. 2000. ISBN 978-0-9677297-1-8.
