= Escuela de Aviación Militar (Argentina) =

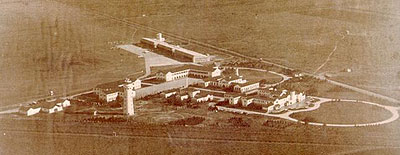
Escuela de Aviación Militar in 1940.

The Escuela de Aviación Militar is an Argentine service academy whose mission is to educate cadets for service in the officer corps of the Argentinian Air Force, forming military aviators. It is located about six kilometers from Córdoba.

It was created on 10 August 1912, as part of the system of academies of the Argentine Army, by a decree of president Roque Sáenz Peña authorizing the use of an old flying club in El Palomar, Buenos Aires, with the collaboration of civil authorities.

In 1934 started the construction of the new headquarters in Córdoba, facilities that were inaugurated by president Agustín Pedro Justo in 1937. In 1945 was created the Argentine Air Force, as a new military force independent of the Army, then the Escuela de Aviación Militar becomes the only institution to train air force officers in the country.
