= The INFO Project =

The INFO (Information and Knowledge for Optimal Health) Project is housed at the Johns Hopkins Bloomberg School of Public Health Center for Communication Programs (JHU∙CCP) and is funded by the United States Agency for International Development.

== Areas of Expertise ==
INFO is a leader in Knowledge Management, generating, synthesizing and delivering evidence-based reproductive health and family planning knowledge. Knowledge management involves systematically and routinely creating, gathering, organizing, sharing, adapting and using knowledge - from both inside and outside an organization - to help achieve organizational goals and objectives. The INFO project aims to close the "know-do" gap among health providers in the developing world; according to the World Health Organization many of the solutions to health problems of the poor exist, but are not being applied. This is called the "know-do" gap—the gap between what is known and what is done in practice. The INFO project disseminated the latest knowledge to health providers so they will be able to implement evidence-based best practice.

== Tools for Knowledge Management ==
As of 2002, an estimated 113.6 million women in the developing world had an unmet need for contraception. In some areas myths persist about side effects of contraception discouraging use, while in other areas providers are unaware of how to recommend and counsel on family planning methods. The INFO Project uses a variety of tools to ensure evidence-based knowledge reaches the intended audience of health care practitioners, policy-makers, program managers, service providers, trainers donors, academics and researchers and to ensure that this unmet need is met. INFO uses the following to achieve its goals of disseminating information and ensuring the adoption of best practices:

- Databases (One Source, POPLINE)
- Publications (including Population Reports and INFO Reports)
- eLearning Courses
- Networks and Communities (Implementing Best Practices Knowledge Gateway, INFO Blog)
