= Pacific Society for Reproductive Health Trust =

Pacific Society for Reproductive Health (PSRH) Trust has a membership of health professionals working in the many Island nations in the Pacific in the area of reproductive health and neonatology. Launched in 1995 in Port Vila, Vanuatu, the Society is registered as a Charitable Trust in New Zealand where the secretariat is housed in the Pacific Women's Health Research Unit at the University of Auckland.

The objectives of PSRH are to advocate for the improvement of maternal and child health across the Pacific by promoting and seeking educational opportunities for its members. More information can be obtained from the Secretariat at Middlemore Hospital, PB 93311, Auckland, New Zealand.

The PSRH and RANZOCG contributed in a major way to the report on "Making Maternal Health Matter"
