= POPLINE =

POPLINE (or Population Information Online) was a reproductive health database, containing citations with abstracts to scientific articles, reports, books, and unpublished reports in the field of population, family planning, and reproductive health issues. POPLINE was maintained by the K4Health Project at the Johns Hopkins Bloomberg School of Public Health/Center for Communication Programs, and it was funded by the United States Agency for International Development (USAID).

== History ==
The original database consisted of citations from Popinform, a database maintained from 1973 to 1978 by the Population Information Program (PIP) at George Washington University. In 1978, the database, along with Population Information Program, moved to the Johns Hopkins University. Between 1980 and 2001, renamed POPLINE, the database became part of the United States National Library of Medicine's (NLM) Medical Literature Analysis and Retrieval System (MEDLARS) along with MEDLINE and other NLM databases.

Since 2001, POPLINE had been maintained by the Knowledge for Health (K4Health) Project, formerly PIP then INFO, based at the Johns Hopkins Bloomberg School of Public Health/Center for Communication Programs. Access to POPLINE was available free of charge at its website. Other organizations contributed to POPLINE throughout its history, such as the Center for Population and Family Health (CPFH) Library/Information Program at Columbia University, Population Index at Princeton University, and the Carolina Population Center (CPC) at the University of North Carolina.

On September 1, 2019, POPLINE was officially retired along with the rest of the Knowledge for Health (K4Health) Project which closed a few days later.

== Coverage ==
POPLINE provided more than 370,000 records citing worldwide literature in the area of reproductive health. The majority of items were published from 1970 to the present, but there were selected citations dating back to 1827. The database added 12 thousand records annually and was updated weekly.

The database consisted of bibliographic citations and abstracts to a variety of materials including journal articles, monographs, technical reports, and unpublished literature.

Subjects covered internationally included family planning methods and programs, fertility, and population law and policy. Additional subjects covered in reference to developing countries include adolescent reproductive health, demography, environmental health, gender and health, health communication, sexually transmitted infections, maternal and child health, population and environment, and women in development.

== Services ==
POPLINE had both basic and advanced searches and offered customized searches provided on request to persons or institutions in developing countries. Full-text copies for most of the documents cited in POPLINE could be requested from users in low-income countries free of charge via mail or sent by email. In addition to free text searching, the database could be searched by keywords from the POPLINE Thesaurus, a controlled vocabulary of 2,400+ terms used to index documents in the database.

== Controversy ==
In 2008, The New York Times reported that Johns Hopkins University had instructed the POPLINE search engine to ignore the search term "abortion", as it ignores search terms such as "a" and "the", in February 2008 in response to pressure from the United States Agency for International Development. Making the term a stop word removed the ability of users to search for this common term for a reproductive health issue.

After learning of the restriction on finding abortion-related articles, the dean of the Johns Hopkins Bloomberg School of Public Health, Michael J. Klag, lifted the restriction.
