= Operation Unokat =

1961 UN offensive in the Congo

- Part of the Congo Crisis
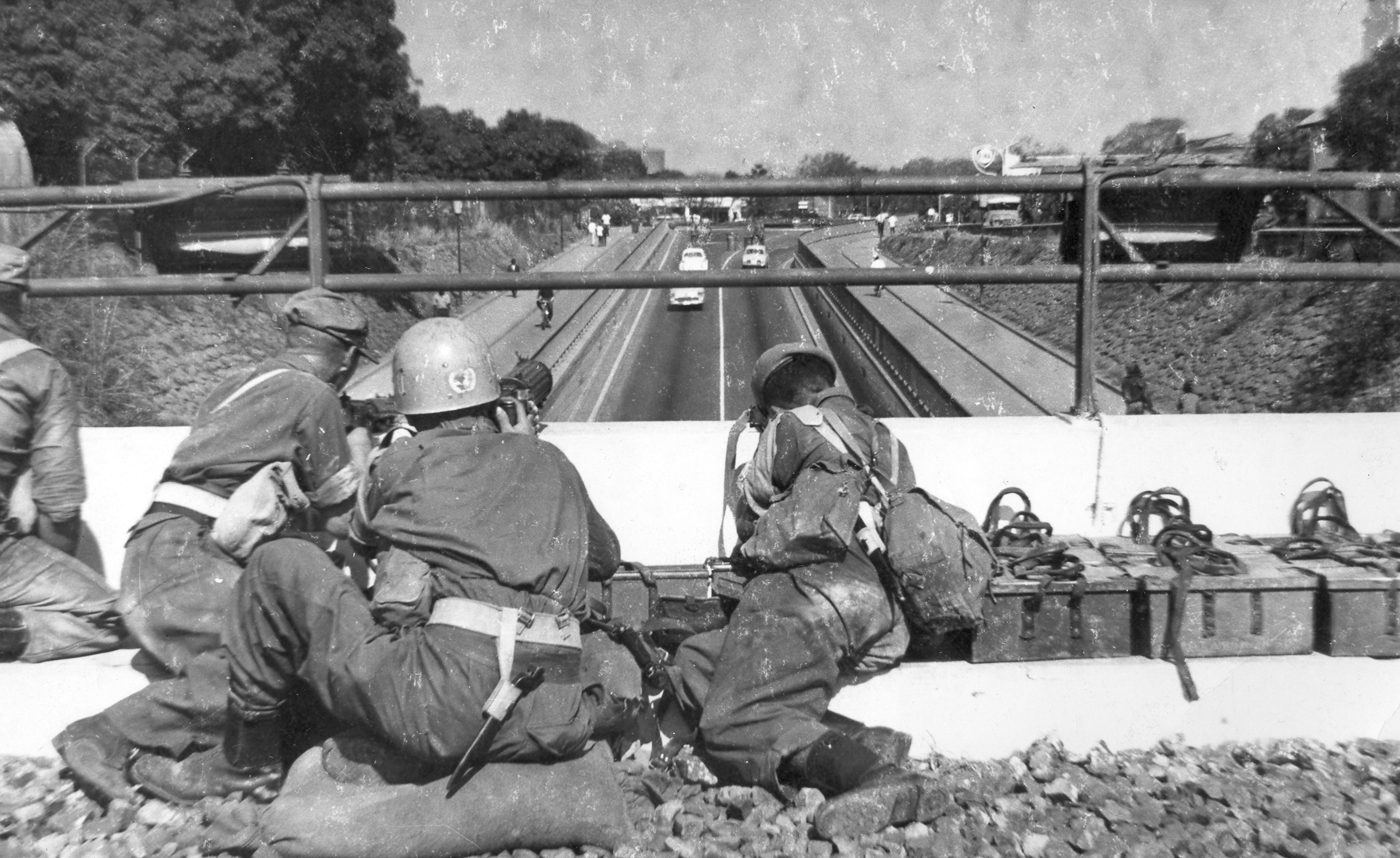
- Irish ONUC troops man a position over a road into Élisabethville during Operation Unokat
Date	5 December 1961 – 21 December 1961 (2 weeks and 2 days)
Location	Élisabethville, State of Katanga
Result	ONUC victory: Kitona Declaration

Belligerents
ONUC (Note: Numerous national forces participated in ONUC, the United Nations Operation in the Congo. For Operation Unokat, this officially included troops from Ethiopia, India, Ireland, Sweden, and Malaya. The United States provided logistical support.): Ethiopia; India; Ireland; Sweden; Malaya; Supported by: Congo-Léopoldville	Katanga; Supported by: Rhodesia and Nyasaland

Commanders and leaders
U Thant; K.A.S. Raja	Moïse Tshombe

Strength
4,500	2,500+

Casualties and losses
10–25 killed 34–120 wounded 15 captured	80–206 killed 250–401 wounded 33–58 captured

Operation Unokat, also styled Operation UNOKAT, was an offensive undertaken by United Nations peacekeeping forces from 5 to 21 December 1961 against the gendarmerie of the State of Katanga, a secessionist state rebelling against the Republic of the Congo (now the Democratic Republic of the Congo) in Central Africa. The United Nations had tried several times to reconcile the government of the Congo with the State of Katanga, which had declared independence under Moïse Tshombe with Belgian support in 1960.

Following the failure of Operation Morthor and the death of Secretary-General of the United Nations Dag Hammarskjöld in a plane crash, the new Secretary-General U Thant, backed by renewed international support, called for a more robust peacekeeping approach and for the UN to take more military action. A number of skirmishes between Katangese troops and UN forces in the Katangese capital of Élisabethville, and the establishment of roadblocks by the Katangese, led to the UN launching Operation Unokat.

The Katangese forces were gradually pushed back and UN forces secured Élisabethville. The Katangese agreed to negotiate an agreement with the Congolese central government, which led to the Kitona Declaration stating that Katanga was part of the Congo and planned to re-integrate with the Congo. However, the agreement was not carried out, forcing the UN to launch Operation Grandslam to forcibly reintegrate Katanga and end the secession.

== Background ==
Following the Republic of the Congo's independence from Belgium in 1960 after over 50 years of colonial rule, the country fell into disorder as the army mutinied. Shortly thereafter South Kasai and the State of Katanga declared independence from the Congolese government. The latter contained the vast majority of the Congo's valuable mineral resources and attracted significant mining activity under Belgian rule. Many Katangese felt entitled to the revenue generated through the lucrative industry, and feared that under the new central government it would be distributed among the Congo's poorer provinces. Resulting nativist politics with support from the Belgian government and private interests such as the Union Minière du Haut-Katanga (UMHK) precipitated the Katangese secession.

To prevent a complete collapse of order within the country, the United Nations established a major peacekeeping mission, the United Nations Operation in the Congo (known under its French acronym as ONUC (Note: French: Opération des Nations Unies au Congo)). In addition to a large body of troops (20,000 at its peak strength), a civilian mission was sent to provide technical assistance to the Congolese government. A new Congolese coalition government was formed in Léopoldville under Prime Minister Cyrille Adoula in August 1961. It faced great pressure to reintegrate Katanga into the Congo and risked collapse if this was not achieved, something ONUC was keen to avoid. The United States also desired reintegration for this end, fearing Adoula's removal would result in his replacement by left-wing politician Antoine Gizenga and allow the Soviet Union to gain influence in the country.

The UN Security Council passed a resolution permitting ONUC to use military force to prevent civil war, make arrests, halt military operations, arrange ceasefires, and deport foreign military personnel. Under the authorisation of this resolution, UN forces launched Operation Rum Punch and Operation Morthor with the aim of securing their own positions in Katanga and eliminating the presence of mercenaries in Élisabethville, the Katangese capital. The former, though limited in scope, was largely successful, but the latter failed to achieve its objectives. As Morthor was underway, Special Representative Conor Cruise O'Brien announced, "The secession of Katanga has ended." This statement was quickly realised to be premature; Katanga fought the offensive to a stalemate.

United Nations Secretary-General Dag Hammarskjöld attempted to meet Tshombe for negotiations in Northern Rhodesia, but on the night of 17 September his plane crashed, killing all aboard. Hammarskjöld's untimely death, combined with an overall rise in tensions, helped rally international support for a more robust peacekeeping approach. His replacement, U Thant, was less averse to using military force in the Congo and believed that the UN should intervene in internal Congolese affairs. Thant promptly requested that the Security Council grant ONUC a stronger mandate. This came in the form of a resolution on 24 November, which maintained the goals of previous ONUC resolutions and cleared up any remaining ambiguities surrounding the role and nature of the UN's intervention. It reaffirmed ONUC's ability to detain and deport foreign military personnel and mercenaries with force, described Katanga's secessionist activities as illegal, and declared the UN's support for the central government of the Congo in its efforts to "maintain law and order and national integrity". Tshombe immediately responded to the resolution by broadcasting an inflammatory speech against ONUC. ONUC's command structure in Katanga, mindful of the new mandate, issued instructions to UN troops to put "an end to Katangese resistance to UN policy by destruction of Gendarmerie and other anti-UN resistance".

== Prelude ==
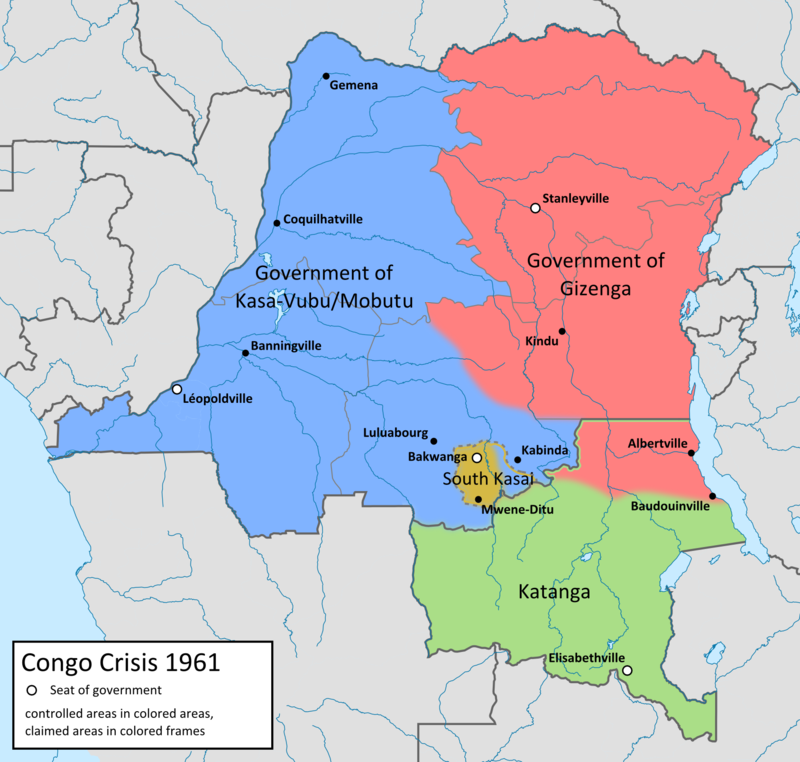
Map of the factions in the Congo in 1961 with the State of Katanga in green

On 28 November 1961 members of the Katangese Gendarmerie (Note: The Katangese Gendarmerie was Katanga's regular army, not a police force.) assaulted the UN Representative in Katanga George Ivan Smith and diplomat Brian Urquhart as they travelled to a diplomatic function. Smith was allowed to leave, but the gendarmes held Urquhart overnight. ONUC subsequently sent out teams to search for him, and its Katanga-based command structure issued an order to respond to such incidents with "hard hitting swiftness. ... Such measures entail hitting at gendarmerie. ... We must have sufficient strength NOT only to hit such concentrations but to take all the consequences of such actions such as meeting counter attacks at various points and putting down ruthlessly European mercenaries and volunteer elements." Tshombe secured Urquhart's release after the UN threatened to attack his presidential palace.

On 2 December a skirmish broke out between Indian ONUC troops and Katangese gendarmes at the Élisabethville airport, resulting in the detention and disarmament of the latter. The Katangese Gendarmerie feared this signalled the beginning of a new ONUC offensive, and established a roadblock along the thoroughfare to the Swedish ONUC camp on the outskirts of the city where it passed as a tunnel under the railway. The ONUC military commander for South Katanga, Colonel Jonas Wærn, called numerous officials to have the block cleared, but was given evasive responses. Two Irish peacekeepers who approached the block were fired upon but escaped without harm. On 3 December, after the UN entreaties to have the block removed had gone unheeded, a Swedish soldier was killed and two ONUC officers were wounded when they attempted to pass through the tunnel and were fired upon by gendarmes. UN medical personnel who attempted to assist them were detained. Smith then requested that all Katangese forces be withdrawn to their barracks and if not, Katangese officials would be responsible for any action the UN took "to ensure the maintenance of law and order and for the protection of its own personnel". The warning had no effect on the Katangese authorities, and the UN reported later that day that 14 soldiers and civilian personnel had been detained by the Katangese. At the same time, urgent negotiations were taking place between the UN and Katangese officials in New York, with the heavy involvement of the United States. Thant sent a message to UN forces in Élisabethville, authorising local UN officials "to act vigorously to establish law and order to protect life and property in Katanga".

On 4 December Tshombe, then visiting France, declared there were no foreign mercenaries in Katanga. Meanwhile, in the Congo, tensions increased as central government troops occupied Kongolo in northern Katanga. That day Brigadier K.A.S. Raja—the commander of all UN forces in Katanga—and Smith toured all ONUC outposts to encourage their troops to remain patient, stressing that they could take no action against the Katangese forces without the permission of the Security Council. After having lunch with the Dogra Regiment at the Élisabethville airport, Raja and Smith left for the local ONUC headquarters. To their surprise, they discovered that the Katangese Gendarmerie had established three new roadblocks which cut them off from the centre of the city. One of these was placed at a roundabout along Avenue Saio-Stanley. Smith telephoned Urquhart, who was at the headquarters, and asked him to scout out the Katangese positions from his vantage. Urquhart complied and reported that the largest roadblock was manned by armoured cars and as many as 300 troops.

Smith then telephoned Lewis Hoffacker and Denzil Dunnett, the United States' and United Kingdom's respective consuls in Élisabethville. He asked them to intercede with Katangese Foreign Minister Évariste Kimba—who was left in charge of the government while Tshombe was abroad—and ask him to remove the roadblocks. The consuls did so and reported that Kimba promised the roadblocks would be removed by 18:00. Before Tshombe departed Paris to attempt to visit Brazil, a United States official informed him that if the roadblocks were not removed the UN would have to take action. Tshombe indicated to the official that he was powerless to have the blocks cleared and that it would be disastrous for him to order such. ONUC troops who had been entrenching themselves near the airport roadblock withdrew, but by the morning of 5 December it was apparent to the UN forces that roadblocks remained. UN officials concluded that Kimba had no control of the gendarmerie and concluded that the Katangese forces were using the roadblocks to cutoff the ONUC camps from one another so that they could be defeated in detail. Radio intercepts also indicated that the gendarmes were attempting to isolate the UN position at the airport. Upon receiving word that Katangese armoured cars were moving out of Jadotville, Smith became convinced that ONUC had to take quick military action to ensure its local presence would survive. Thant concurred that action should be taken to restore ONUC's freedom of movement, and once the necessary orders were delivered to Raja, Indian ONUC troops began establishing positions near the Katangese roadblocks. At noon the UN announced that Raja was assuming control of all of ONUC's presence in Katanga.

== Opposing forces ==
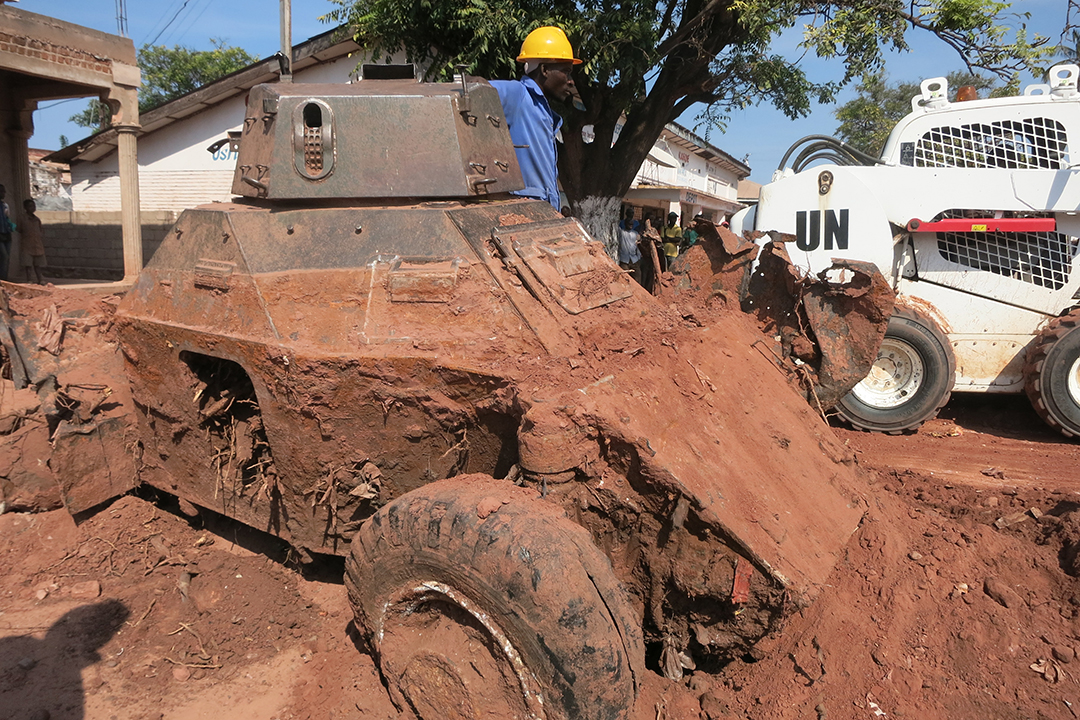
A Ferret armoured car formerly operated by the Malayan ONUC contingent, salvaged at Kalemie in 2016

At the time of Operation Unokat, ONUC had two operational brigades. These included two Swedish battalions, two Indian battalions, two Ethiopian battalions, one Irish battalion, as well as Swedish, Irish and Malayan armoured cars; 2,500 soldiers were in Élisabethville at the beginning of the operation, with several thousand additional personnel elsewhere in Katanga. ONUC was able to establish an air force in October consisting of five Swedish Saab 29 Tunnan (J-29) jets, four Ethiopian F-86 Sabre jets, and four Indian B(I)58 Canberra light bombers. ONUC had also been reinforced with new artillery. At Thant's request, the United States Air Force placed several Douglas C-124 Globemaster II transports at ONUC's disposal to bring supplies and troops into Katanga.

They were opposed by six battalions of Katangese Gendarmerie, backed by units of military police, commandos, presidential guard, paramilitaries, and militias. Of 10,000–11,000 total gendarmes, 2,500 were stationed in Élisabethville. Foreign mercenaries, especially from Belgium, supported and assisted the Gendamerie from its inception despite the UN's attempts in Operation Rum Punch, Operation Morthor and in Security Council Resolution 169 to expel them from the Congo. The Katangese Air Force was headquartered in Kolwezi, where gendarmes controlled the local airstrip. Though it had lost a large number of its aircraft during the earlier Operation Rum Punch, the Katangese were in possession of one operational Fouga CM.170 Magister. Throughout October and November the Gendarmerie had been reinforced with additional mercenaries, munitions, and aircraft. During the operation the Federation of Rhodesia and Nyasaland provided Katanga with support.

== Operation ==
=== Initial actions ===
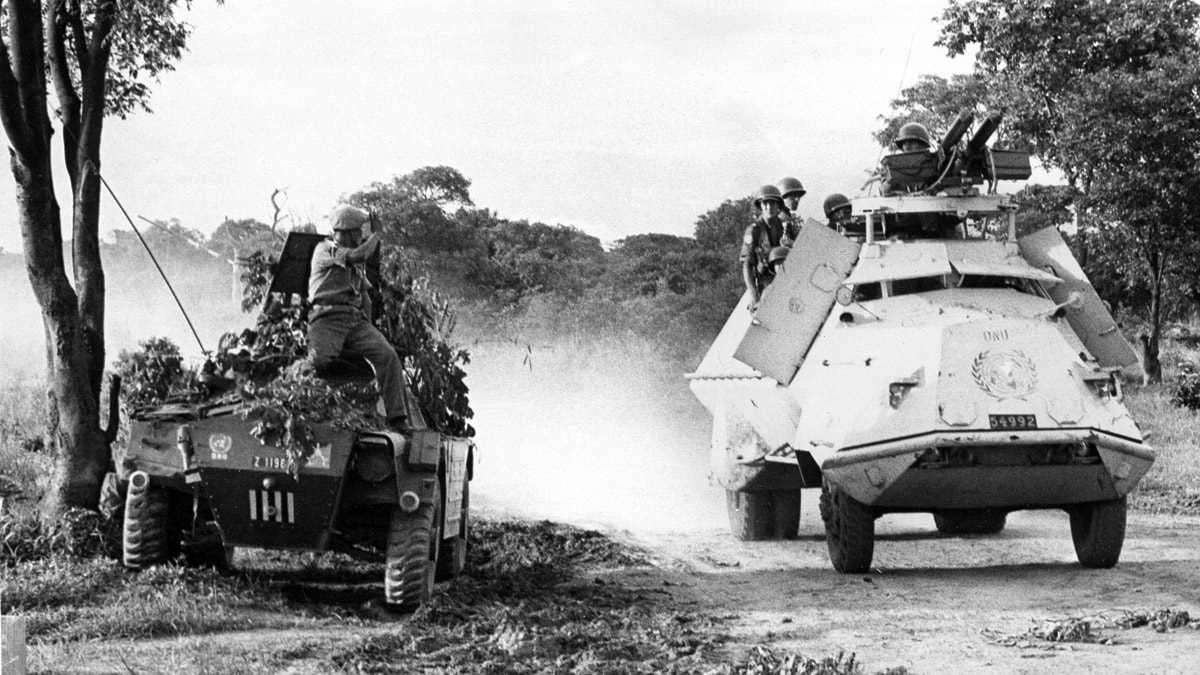
Swedish troops move into position near Elisabethville airport in Katanga Province, December 5, 1961

Operation Unokat (Note: Unokat is a portmanteau of "UN over Katanga." The episode of fighting was also dubbed "Round Two" in reference to other UN–Katangese "rounds" of fighting.) began on 5 December at 12:15 when ONUC Indian Gorkha troops holding the airport launched an attack to remove the gendarmerie roadblock on the highway between themselves and Élisabethville. Under the command of Brigadier Raja, they were able to clear the road with armoured cars by 14:30 with the support of the Irish and Swedish contingents. The Gorkhas subsequently established a roadblock of their own. A platoon under the command of Captain Gurbachan Singh Salaria attempted to link up with the roadblock but came under attack from 90 gendarmes and two armoured vehicles dug in at the old Élisabethville airstrip. With support from grenades and a rocket launcher, Salaria led a bayonet and kukri charge which drove the gendarmes from their positions. The Katangese lost 40 men and the armoured cars, while 12 Indians were wounded and Salaria killed. He was awarded the Param Vir Chakra posthumously for his actions. That day a Katangese plane bombed the Élisabethville airport, and the Irish contingent's camp began receiving sniper fire. ONUC aircraft began patrolling the skies and, though they did not engage any targets, their presence heavily improved UN morale. They also scattered leaflets across Katanga, telling the population that ONUC sought to ensure peace.

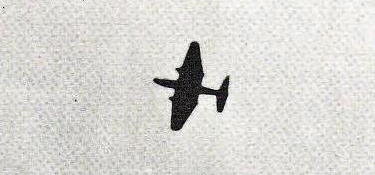
UN Canberra bomber in action over Elisabethville

On 6 December Swedish peacekeepers secured the tunnel under the railway and removed the roadblock near there after a brief exchange of fire with the gendarmes, who retreated. In retaliation for the Katangese strike on Élisabethville airport, ONUC Canberra bombers raided the Kolwezi airstrip, destroying a dummy of the Katangese Fouga jet and three other planes. (Note: According to journalist Stan Meisler, the ONUC planes sortied from Luluabourg. According to political scientist Catherine Hoskyns, the bombers had been moved from Luluabourg to Kamina and took off from there.) Several other Katangese Air Force craft were stored at other small airstrips and avoided destruction. The presence of UN combat aircraft forced the remnants of the force, under the leadership of mercenary Jerry Puren, to only conduct sorties at night, which were ineffective. Kimba blamed the United States for the air attacks. The Katangese placed Hoffacker under house arrest, and Kimba rejected the notion of seeking a ceasefire, vowing that Katangese forces would enact a scorched-earth policy.

Over the following days ONUC planes attacked several targets throughout Katanga, including a military train east of Kolwezi and the Jadotville airfield. They bombed several UMHK facilities, including the Luili electrolytic refinery near Kolwezi, disabling several auxiliary fuelling and power facilities. As a result, UMHK removed its copper quotations from international markets and did not resume posting them until January. Throughout the following week ONUC troops focused on holding their positions on the outskirts of town and maintaining their lines of communication while awaiting reinforcements. ONUC jets sortied to attack specific locations and disrupt Katangese attempts to reinforce themselves in the city; they destroyed railroad bridges linking to Jadotville and Kolwezi. Under the direction of mercenaries and European officers, Katangese gendarmes subjected UN positions to mortar bombardments and clashed with ONUC forces on the periphery of Élisabethville.

ONUC contingents reported that local European civilians were aiding the Katangese as snipers and that mercenaries were attacking their positions from ambulances, schools, and hospitals so as to exploit ONUC efforts to counter them for propaganda purposes. Smith reported to the UN that International Committee of the Red Cross delegate Georges Olivet "confirmed" to him that "Katanga military and mercenaries are making use of the Red Cross symbol to protect their military operations against the United Nations." One group of snipers took up positions in houses adjacent to the American Seventh-day Adventist mission to fire upon the ONUC headquarters. After one afternoon of intense fire from these snipers, Urquhart asked the United States consul to evacuate the Adventist mission so ONUC could counterattack. Once the missionaries evacuated, the snipers withdrew. (Note: According to Meisler, the UN forces actually bombarded the mission accidentally while it was occupied by the missionaries.) The Katangese authorities exaggerated the scale of the fighting and the number of casualties, highlighting damage inflicted to schools, churches, and hospitals. Most foreign journalists were staying in the centre of town, which was occupied by the Katangese, thus the former were able to easily disseminate their version of events. The Katanga Information Services also established a bureau in the foyer of the largest hotel in the city. Newspapers around the world carried stories of UN-inflicted atrocities and destruction, evoking letters and editorials of protest in right-wing media. A full-page advertisement was run in The New York Times announcing the creation of an "American Committee for Aid to Katanga Freedom Fighters". The UN's own media organs generally proved unable to counter these stories with their own information.

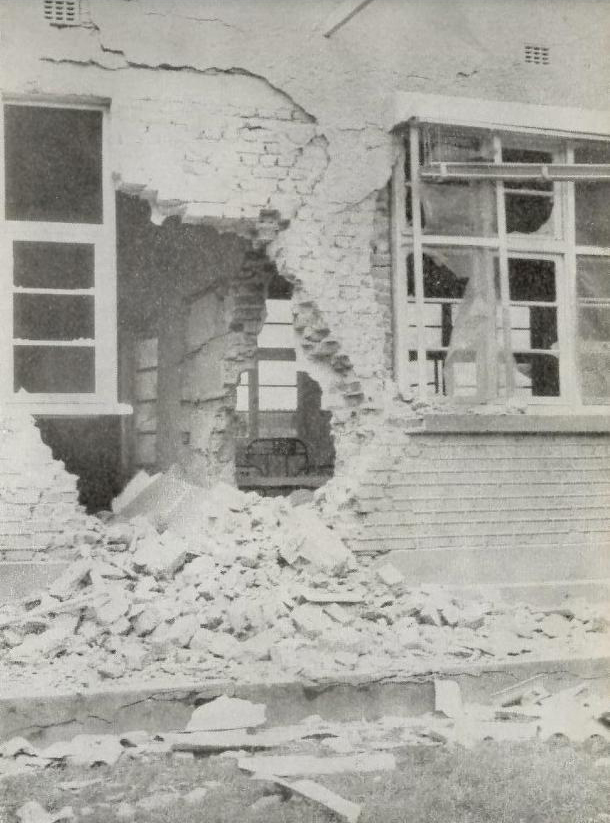
Photo of damage to the hospital at Shinkolobwe inflicted during the fighting, published in a pamphlet issued by the Katangese government

On 7 December Tshombe, having been denied a visa to Brazil after fighting broke out, returned to Élisabethville. Katangese mortars bombarded the Irish camp and a patrol was sent out to locate their position but was unsuccessful in finding them. The Katangese then launched a direct attack on the camp but were repelled. Indian mortar teams at the Swedish camp responded by bombarding Camp Massart, a large gendarmerie base. A company of gendarmes attacked an Indian Dogra platoon at the Jadotville road juncture with an armoured bulldozer, hoping to achieve surprise in the poor visibility. The bulldozer was destroyed by a recoilless rifle and the gendarmes were driven off with heavy casualties by mortars. That day United States Globemasters flew 400 Ethiopian and Irish troops into Élisabethville. Three of them were damaged by anti-aircraft fire while landing, as the Canberras attempted to cover them by attacking Katangese positions near the airport. In response, Tshombe declared that the United States was "murdering Katanga". By 8 December ONUC had achieved air superiority over Katanga. That day Irish troops cleared several homes of snipers near their camp, though a mortar strike killed one peacekeeper and wounded five others.

United States President John F. Kennedy hoped UN military pressure would force Tshombe to seek an agreement with Adoula. Kennedy feared that his foreign policy was struggling to earn a positive public appraisal; opinion among American politicians concerning the situation in Katanga was strongly divided, and American officials defended their support for the UN by stressing that Congolese unity was necessary to achieve regional stability and prevent communist exploitation. In the United Kingdom, some Conservative members of Parliament attacked the Macmillan government for failing to stop what they saw as an unfair attack on Katanga. Outrage over an announcement that the United Kingdom would supply bombs to the Indian Canberras led them to craft a motion of censure against the government. In turn, the United Kingdom reneged on its munitions offer and instead requested a pause in the fighting. The fighting also garnered strong protests from France, Portugal, the Federation of Rhodesia and Nyasaland, South Africa, and Congo-Brazzaville. Belgian Foreign Minister Paul-Henri Spaak sent two telegrams voicing his objections to the UN's action to Thant.

On 9 December ONUC halted all rail traffic between Élisabethville and Northern Rhodesia, believing that it was being used to smuggle weapons. Following a meeting between Adoula and ONUC Chief Sture Linnér, the Congolese government and the UN issued a joint communique in Élisabethville stating that the UN's only objectives were the "restoration of law and order and arrest of foreign mercenaries" and further declaring that the Adoula Government would "seek a political solution" in Katanga once this was completed. That day the UN scheduled a conference of military commanders to be held at its Élisabethville headquarters, with UN Force Commander General Sean MacEoin traveling from Léopoldville to attend. Colonel Wærn and four of his battalion commanders took an armoured car along the route between the airport and headquarters and were ambushed by gendarmes hiding in drainage ditches. The car's gunner was fatally wounded and two commanders were also wounded, but they reached the headquarters building for the conference. The Katangese initiated a mortar strike on the building. They launched an estimated 106 rounds, destroying an armoured car and forcing the ONUC commanders to hold their conference in the building's cellar. MacEoin decided that ONUC should draw up plans to clear Élisabethville of all Katangese forces to ensure its freedom of movement. Afterwards, the Swedish commanders took the remaining four armoured cars they had at their headquarters to the airport. They were ambushed again by gendarmes, but the Katangese fire was inaccurate and MacEoin was successfully evacuated. The following morning the ONUC Canberras, covered by the J-29s, bombed Camp Massart. Over the following days the Katangese established a roadblock along Avenue Usoke near the Socopetrol fuel depot to protect their fuel supplies, but the depot's tanks were set ablaze in a raid by Irish troops.

=== UN offensive ===
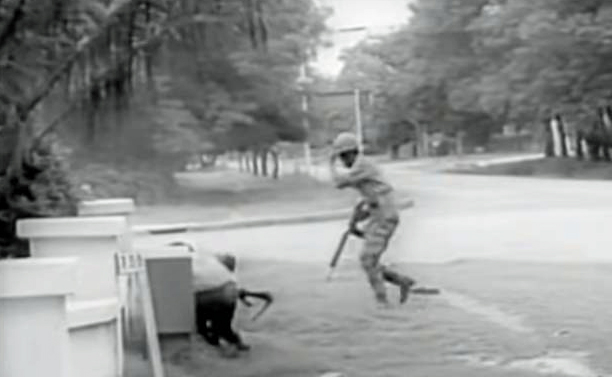
Katangese gendarmes battling UN peacekeepers in Élisabethville

ONUC planned to engage in major operations on 13 December, and if not then, once it had its reinforcements ready. Ultimately, 2,000 additional troops were flown in, bring the number of ONUC personnel participating in the operation up to 4,500. By 15 December their preparations were complete and ONUC initiated a general offensive to occupy the centre of Élisabethville and block Katangese escape routes to the west. UN troops successfully secured areas to the east and west of their headquarters in the city. Through the evening and the following day the Ethiopian contingent fought through the Lido area to block Katangese paths of escape to Kipushi and Rhodesia, the Ghorkas attacked the city centre, and the Irish and Swedes secured the industrial district in preparation for an attack on Camp Massart, the main gendarmerie base, which was subsequently achieved.

On 16 December Irish troops of the 36th Battalion secured the main railway line into Élisabethville in what became known as 'The Battle of the Tunnel'. Three men from Company A died in the fighting but the Irish managed to take the railway bridge and secure the road tunnel underneath to cut the main links into the city.

On 17 December ONUC troops made further advances and their jets struck the UMHK headquarters after the Ethiopian contingent reported being fired upon from its environs. Occupation of the city progressed slowly, a fact which Urquhart attributed to a lack of respect for Raja by his Indian subordinates, tension between the Indian and Swedish contingents, and a lack of discipline among the Ethiopian contingent. By 18 December ONUC had near-total control of Élisabethville with the key exceptions of Tshombe's presidential palace and the UMHK headquarters. Sporadic mortar and sniper fired continued as the Ethiopians and Gurkhas continued mopping-up resistance. Some Baluba refugees from the nearby refugee camp came into the town to loot; UN Headquarters established a depot to store confiscated plunder.

=== Ceasefire and Kitona Declaration ===
Thant and American officials rejected the initial calls for a pause in UN military action issued by the United Kingdom—which were supported by France—citing the necessity of achieving "minimum objectives". On 14 December Tshombe began appealing for a ceasefire agreement, sending a telegram to President Kennedy expressing his desire to meet with Adoula. Adoula requested that the United States refrain from pushing ONUC to prematurely offer a ceasefire until Tshombe could be forced into a weaker position. As the fighting continued, officials from different North Atlantic Treaty Organization member states intensely debated what policy should be pursued. United States Ambassador to the Congo Edmund A. Gullion and American intelligence officials believed UN military action should continue to pressure Tshombe, British officials threatened to withdraw their support for the UN's policy if the fighting intensified, and French Foreign Minister Maurice Couve de Murville pushed for an immediate ceasefire, wishing to avoid a military defeat for either Tshombe or ONUC. The Belgian government also sought an immediate ceasefire. The United States responded to Tshombe's entreaties by asking UN diplomat Ralph Bunche to set up a meeting between Tshombe and Adoula.

Tshombe agreed to meet with representatives of the Congolese central government at Kitona Air Base on 20 December under a joint guarantee of protection from the United States and UN to seek a political agreement. He left for Kitona on the morning of 19 December, as Thant directed ONUC forces to adhere to a ceasefire; Raja in turn ordered his forces to hold their fire and only respond if attacked. The order went into effect at 7:15. Sporadic fighting continued as ONUC contingents were subject to sniper fire from various areas in Élisabethville. Gendarmes withdrew from the post office, while Ethiopian troops assaulted and captured the UMHK headquarters. Throughout the city UN ordinance officers collected unexploded munitions and civilians began to walk around freely.

Bunche and Ambassador Gullion represented the UN and the United States, respectively during the talks at Kitona. Adoula brought a delegation consisting of his most stridently anti-secessionist ministers. The negotiations started with only the Katangese and Congolese delegations, but when their debate intensified Bunche and Gullion joined them to mediate. With tensions arising from Tshombe's argument that he was not solely competent to negotiate on behalf of Katanga concerning future constitutional matters, Gullion made a breakthrough in the talks by suggesting that in addition to a written Katangese-Congolese agreement, Tshombe could express his views in a letter to Bunche. At 2:30 on 21 December Tshombe agreed to sign an eight-point document, the Kitona Declaration, which in-effect renounced Katanga's secession and recognised the application of the Congolese constitution throughout the entire country. Upon receiving word of Tshombe's signature, Thant confirmed the UN ceasefire.

== Aftermath ==
=== Casualties ===
Casualty estimates for Operation Unokat vary. According to political scientist Catherine Hoskyns, over the course of the operation 25 ONUC soldiers were killed and 120 wounded. Approximately 80 Katangese gendarmes were killed and 250 wounded. The International Red Cross reported that at most 32 European civilians were killed. Statistics were not collected on African civilian deaths but minimal fighting took place in African-populated areas. According to Ernest W. Lefever and Wynfred Joshua, 21 ONUC soldiers were killed while 84 were wounded. They further list 206 Katangese troops as killed with 50 civilians killed or wounded. Meisler lists 21 ONUC deaths, 200 Katangese gendarme deaths, and six Katangese European mercenary deaths. According to George Marteli, 10 peacekeepers were killed with 34 wounded, while the Katangese suffered 141 dead with 401 wounded. B. Chakravorty stated that 21 ONUC soldiers were killed and 100 wounded, while 202 Katangese soldiers were killed and 58 captured. (Note: Chakravorty specified that the Ethiopians suffered 8 dead and 27 wounded, the Indians 7 dead and 33 wounded, the Irish 3 dead and 21 wounded, the Swedes 3 dead and 18 wounded, and the Malayans 1 wounded.) On 15 January 1962 the Red Cross hosted a prisoner exchange; ONUC exchanged 33 Katangese prisoners for 15 ONUC peacekeepers detained by the Katangese. The fate of the Katangese Fouga jet is ultimately unknown.

=== Alleged UN atrocities ===
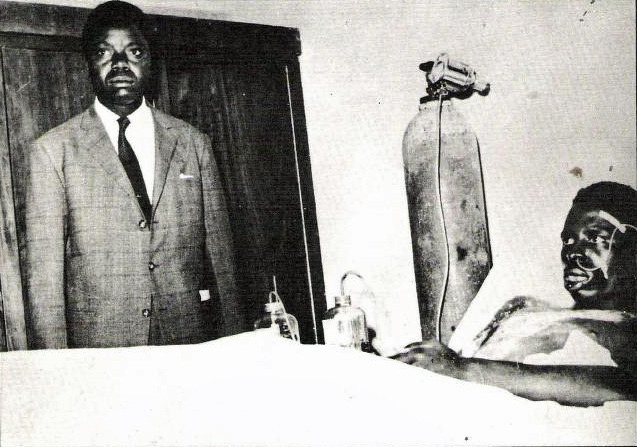
Katangese President Tshombe visiting a civilian casualty of Operation Unokat

Operation Unokat attracted a large number of journalists and the attention of many politicians. While international opinion had grown accustomed to news of Congolese-inflicted atrocities, many commentators were taken aback by the collateral damage of ONUC's actions. Several researchers published a series of reports on the operation. British human rights advocate Edward Russell conducted a fact-finding tour and subsequently wrote The Tragedy of the Congo. In it he accused ONUC of indiscriminately bombing civilian centres and suggested that one peacekeeping contingent was completely lacking in discipline. He recommended that an enquiry into ONUC's deployments be commissioned to investigate his findings. A handful of doctors who had witnessed the fighting released their report in Belgium, entitled Forty-six Angry Men. They accused three specific contingents of violating the Geneva Conventions by shooting unarmed men. Their claims were reinforced with photographic evidence. The UN later admitted that two instances of rape and some limited looting were the fault of ONUC troops. Red Cross delegate Olivet and two volunteers, Nicole Vroonen and Styts Smeding, were shot and killed while operating their ambulance during the fighting on 13 December. The results of a joint UN-International Red Cross investigation of the incident and the identity of their killers were not made public, but the UN paid a settlement to Olivet's family and Belgian news reports held an Ethiopian peacekeeper responsible.

=== Political consequences ===
Operation Unokat left the UN with control of most strategic locations in Élisabethville and eliminated the threat posed by the Katangese Air Force. Tshombe's government accused the Baluba burgomasters of the Albert and Katuba communes of failing to support it during the December conflict and suspended them from their duties. Prime Minister of the Federation of Rhodesia and Nyasaland Roy Welensky was infuriated by the outcome.

In a cover letter to Bunche concerning his signature of the Kitona Declaration, Tshombe noted that he had not been mandated to represent Katanga's position at Kitona and stated that he would have to consult other officials when he returned to Katanga. An official communique released by the Katangese authorities indicated that Tshombe's government strongly disliked the terms of the declaration, felt it was non-binding, and had no consensus on its implementation. Bunche and United States officials feared Tshombe would completely renege on the agreement and articulated a plan of UN pressure to ensure his cooperation, though they ruled out further military action. The Soviet Union expressed dissatisfaction with the situation, arguing that the UN had stopped short of forcing Tshombe to submit to central government authority. Tshombe subsequently submitted the Kitona Declaration to the Katangese Parliament for ratification. The body appointed a commission to evaluate the agreement's legality. The commission produced a report which recommended ratification, but the Katangese Parliament edited the report to refer to the declaration as a "working draft" which could serve as a basis for Katanga's reintegration into the Congo. Commissions were established to consider all points of reintegration. Tshombe proved reluctant to consider the most substantive aspects of rejoining the Congo, and in June 1962 he broke off negotiations with the central government.

In August 1962 Thant proposed a "Plan for National Reconciliation" by which Katanga would rejoin a federalised Congo. Adoula and Tshombe both accepted the proposal. Thant was wary of Tshombe's delaying tactics and applied increasing political pressure on the Katangese government to abide by the plan's timetable. Tshombe ultimately rejected the plan and pushed for a looser Congolese confederation, while Thant grew impatient and increasingly sought to end the Katangese secession and the UN's presence in the Congo. In December 1962 fighting broke out between ONUC and Katangese forces in Élisabethville. ONUC initiated Operation Grandslam, pushing through southern Katanga and occupying Jadotville and Kolwezi. In January 1963 Tshombe surrendered and ended the secession. ONUC withdrew from the Congo in June 1964.

== Works cited ==
- Abbott, Peter (2014). Modern African Wars (4): The Congo 1960–2002. Oxford; New York City: Osprey Publishing. ISBN 978-1-78200-076-1.
- Baker, Patrick S. (May 2015). "Mercenaries and the Congo Crisis". Saber and Scroll. 2 (1) (Edited and revised ed.): 89–103.
- Boulden, Jane (2001). Peace Enforcement: The United Nations Experience in Congo, Somalia, and Bosnia (illustrated ed.). Greenwood Publishing Group. ISBN 9780275969066.
- Chakravorty, B. (1995). Stories of Heroism: PVC & MVC Winners (illustrated ed.). Allied Publishers. ISBN 9788170235163.
- Chakravorty, B. (1976). Prasad, S. N. (ed.). The Congo Operation, 1960–63. Delhi: Historical Section, Ministry of Defence, Govt. of India. OCLC 7739489.
- Cordier, Andrew Wellington; Harrelson, Max, eds. (2013). Public Papers of the Secretaries General of the United Nations. Vol. 6. Columbia University Press. ISBN 9780231513807.
- Dobbins, James; Jones, Seth G.; Crane, Keith; Rathmell, Andrew; Steele, Brett (2001). The UN's Role in Nation-Building: From the Congo to Iraq. RAND Corporation. ISBN 978-0-8330-3756-5.
- Dorn, A. Walter (2016). Air Power in UN Operations: Wings for Peace. Military Strategy and Operational Art. Routledge. ISBN 9781317183396.
- Dorn, A. Walter (2007). "U Thant: Buddhism in Action". In Kille, Kent J. (ed.). The UN Secretary-General and Moral Authority: Ethics and Religion in International Leadership. Georgetown University Press. ISBN 9781589014732.
- Forest, Philip (February 1964). "Sudden Emergency". The Wide World Magazine. Vol. 132, no. 785. pp. 122–129.
- Harvey, Dan (2017). Into Action : Irish Peacekeepers Under Fire, 1960-2014 (online ed.). Kildare: Merrion Press. ISBN 9781785371226.
- Hoskyns, Catherine (1965). The Congo Since Independence: January 1960 – December 1961. London: Oxford University Press. OCLC 414961.
- James, Alan (1996). Britain and the Congo Crisis, 1960–63 (illustrated ed.). Springer. ISBN 978-1-349-24528-4.
- Kennes, Erik; Larmer, Miles (2016). The Katangese Gendarmes and War in Central Africa: Fighting Their Way Home. Indiana University Press. ISBN 9780253021502.
- Kent, John (2010). America, the UN and Decolonisation: Cold War Conflict in the Congo. London: Routledge. ISBN 9780415464147.
- Lefever, Ernest W.; Joshua, Wynfred (1966). United Nations Peacekeeping in the Congo: 1960–1964. Vol. 3. Washington, D.C.: Brookings Institution. OCLC 631685344.
- Luard, Evan (2016). A History of the United Nations. Vol. 2: The Age of Decolonization, 1955–1965 (illustrated ed.). Springer. ISBN 978-1-349-20030-6.
- Meisler, Stanley (2011). United Nations: A History (revised ed.). Grove Press. ISBN 9780802194992.
- Mockaitis, Thomas R. (1999). Peace Operations and Intrastate Conflict: The Sword Or the Olive Branch? (illustrated ed.). Greenwood Publishing Group. ISBN 9780275961732.
- O'Ballance, Edgar (1999). The Congo-Zaire Experience, 1960–98 (illustrated ed.). Springer. ISBN 9780230286481.
- Prasad, Shankar (2005). The Gallant Dogras: An Illustrated History of the Dogra Regiment. Lancer Publishers. ISBN 9788170622680.
- Young, Crawford (1965). Politics in the Congo: Decolonization and Independence. Princeton: Princeton University Press. OCLC 307971.
