= United Nations Operation in the Congo =

1960s United Nations military operation

- Abbreviation: ONUC
- Formation: 14 July 1960
- Legal status: Completed on 30 June 1964
- Headquarters: Leopoldville (now Kinshasa)
- Parent organization: United Nations Security Council
- Website: https://peacekeeping.un.org/sites/default/files/past/onuc.htm

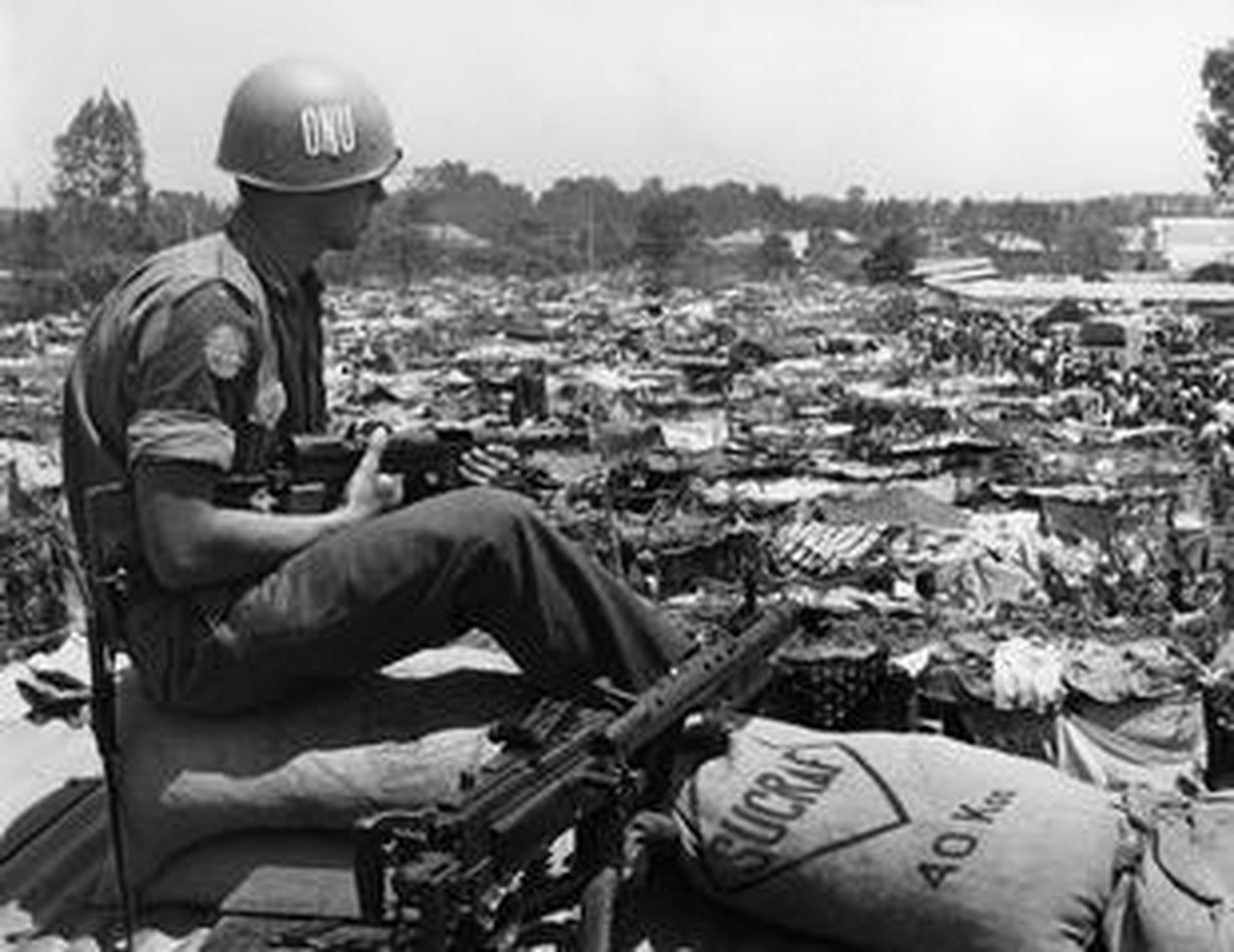
Swedish ONUC peacekeeper in the Congo

The United Nations Operation in the Congo (French: Opération des Nations Unies au Congo, abbreviated ONUC) was a United Nations peacekeeping force which was deployed in the Republic of the Congo in 1960 in response to the Congo Crisis. The ONUC was the UN's first peacekeeping mission with significant military capability, and remains one of the largest UN operations in size and scope.

The Congo descended into chaos and disorder after it became independent from Belgium on 30 June 1960. This prompted a swift return of Belgian troops, for the declared purpose of restoring order and protecting its nationals. In response to the Congolese government's appeal for assistance, on 14 July 1960, the United Nations Security Council passed Resolution 143 (S/4387), which called on Belgium to withdraw its troops and authorized the UN Secretary-General to provide the Congolese government with military assistance. The first UN troops, drawn mostly from African and Asian states, reached the Congo the following day.

In the face of worsening conditions—including an insurrection in Katanga, the assassination of Prime Minister Patrice Lumumba, the collapse of the central government, and the intervention of foreign mercenaries—the ONUC's initial mandate gradually expanded to include protecting the territorial integrity and political independence of the Congo, preventing an impending civil war, and securing the removal of all unauthorized foreign armed forces.

UN forces numbered nearly 20,000 military personnel at its peak from over two dozen countries, led largely by India, Ireland, and Sweden. During the peak of hostilities between September 1961 and December 1962, the ONUC transitioned from a peacekeeping to a military force and engaged in several clashes and offensives against secessionist and mercenary forces. After the reintegration of Katanga in February 1963, the ONUC was gradually phased out; civilian aid increased, becoming the single largest assistance effort by the UN up to that time. UN personnel were withdrawn entirely on 30 June 1964.

== Background ==
The Congo became independent on 30 June 1960, but Belgian Lieutenant General Émile Janssens, commander of the Force Publique (FP) (the army) refused to rapidly "Africanize" the FP officers. Disorder and mutinies quickly followed, four days after the Congo gained independence. While President Joseph Kasa-Vubu and Prime Minister Patrice Lumumba were trying to negotiate with the mutineers, the Belgian government decided to intervene to protect Belgians remaining in the country. Interference from Belgium was seen as neo-colonial aggression by the Congolese government; Lumumba accused the Belgian officers of causing the mutiny and trying to annex the Congo. When Belgium received Moïse Tshombé's acceptance, they sent troops to take over Katanga Province and protect mining interests. Katanga was rich in minerals and natural resources, contributing over 60 percent of the Congo's raw materials. It had some of the world's major sources of copper, cobalt, diamonds and uranium in the world, with its uranium used for the nuclear bomb the US dropped on Hiroshima during World War II.

On 10 July, Belgian troops were sent to Élisabethville (the capital of Katanga) to control the situation and protect Belgian civilians. There were 100,000 Belgians living in the Congo at the time, and many were in a state of panic. The presence of Belgian troops was illegal under international law, because Congolese officials had not requested their presence. With the help of the Belgians (who wrote his declarations), Tshombé proclaimed the independence of the State of Katanga by television on 11 July and announced himself as president. He was widely regarded by critics worldwide as a puppet for the Belgians and their mining interests in Katanga. On 12 July, the president and prime minister asked for help from the United Nations. UN Secretary-General Dag Hammarskjöld addressed the Security Council at a night meeting on 13 July, asking the council to act "with utmost speed" on the request.

At the meeting the Security Council adopted Resolution 143, which called on the government of Belgium to withdraw its troops from the Congo. The resolution authorized the Secretary-General to facilitate the withdrawal of Belgian troops, maintain law and order, and help to establish and legitimize the post-colonial government in consultation with the government of the Republic of the Congo. The mission was approved by a Security Council vote of eight in favor and none against, with three countries abstaining: the Republic of China, France and the United Kingdom. The United States and Soviet Union voted in favor. The mandate was extended to maintain the territorial integrity of the Congo, particularly through the removal of foreign mercenaries supporting the secession of Katanga. ONUC was an unprecedented role for a UN force because it was not, strictly speaking, peacekeeping in nature.

== Operations ==
=== Deployment ===
The United Nations stated four goals for the operation: to restore law and order, to keep other nations out of the crisis, to help build the country's economy, and to restore stability. A peacekeeping force had landed in the country within 48 hours of the resolution, and civilian experts were tasked with keeping the country's infrastructure operating smoothly.

=== 1960 ===
Lumumba asked the United Nations to intervene and use military force to stop Tshombe's forces in Katanga. The first UN troops arrived on 15 July, many airlifted by the United States Air Force as part of Operation New Tape. There was instant disagreement between Lumumba and the UN over the new force's mandate. Because the Congolese army had been in disarray since the mutiny, Lumumba wanted to use the UN troops to subdue Katanga by force; he saw their refusal as betraying the United Nations' initial plans. Lumumba wrote to UN Secretary-General Dag Hammarskjöld that, from the text of United Nations Security Council Resolution 143, "it is clear that, contrary to your personal interpretation, the UN force may be used to subdue the rebel government of Katanga". Secretary-General Hammarskjöld refused; to him the secession of Katanga was an internal Congolese matter, and the UN was forbidden to intervene by Article 2 of the United Nations Charter. He said that intervention in Katanga would mean that the UN would be using force in part of the country, which would not be seen as peacekeeping. Disagreements over what the UN force could and could not do continued throughout its deployment.

In response, Lumumba accused the UN of siding with Tshombe and foreign mining companies. He then asked the Soviet Union for assistance, and received aid in the form of trucks and aircraft; this deeply concerned the United States and its allies. Using materiel from the former Force Publique, Lumumba ordered the army to attack the breakaway Katanga province but failed to take it back. President Joseph Kasa-Vubu dismissed Lumumba on 5 September 1960, which was condemned by the Congo's houses of parliament; Lumumba refused to step down. On 14 September, Kasa-Vubu dissolved parliament and Joseph-Désiré Mobutu announced on radio that he would take control of the country's military. After Lumumba's dismissal, Hammarskjöld's Léopoldville representative Andrew Cordier instructed that all airfields be closed and the capital's main radio station be shut down. Lumumba was unable to fly in any troops who were loyal to him, and lost his only means of mass communications.

By 20 July 1960, 3,500 ONUC troops had arrived in the Congo. They included 460 troops from the Ethiopian Army (later to become the Tekil Brigade), 770 troops from the Ghana Armed Forces, 1,250 troops from Morocco, and 1,020 troops from the Tunisian Armed Forces. The first contingent of Belgian forces left Leopoldville on 16 July, upon the arrival of United Nations troops. After assurances that United Nations contingents would arrive in sufficient numbers, Belgian authorities agreed to withdraw all their forces from the Leopoldville area by 23 July. The last Belgian troops left the country by that day, as United Nations forces continued to deploy throughout the Congo. The buildup continued, with ONUC's strength increasing to over 8,000 by 25 July and to over 11,000 by 31 July 1960. Troops had also arrived from countries which included Sweden, Norway, Ireland and Ethiopia. The UN secretary-general said that there would be no troops from the great powers or from countries with an interest in the crisis. A basic agreement between the United Nations and the Congolese government on the operation of the force was finalized by 27 July, and the UN set up a headquarters in a seven-story apartment building on the Boulevard d'Albert in central Léopoldville.

Albert Kalonji declared the region of south-eastern Kasai, on the Congo's southern border with Portuguese Angola, the new mining state of South Kasai (État minier du Sud-Kasaï) or Autonomous State of South Kasai (État autonome du Sud-Kasaï) on 9 August 1960. (Note: Nzongola-Ntalaja 2007, p. 105) The use of the word "state" (état) was deliberately ambiguous, allowing Kalonji to avoid specifying whether South Kasai claimed independence as a nation-state (like Katanga) or a province within the Congo. Due to rejection of requests to the UN for aid to suppress the South Kasai and Katanga revolts, the Lumumba Government decided to request Soviet assistance. De Witte wrote that "Leopoldville asked the Soviet Union for planes, lorries, arms, and equipment ... Shortly afterwards, on 22 or 23 August, about 1,000 soldiers left for Kasai." De Witte also wrote that on 26–27 August, the ANC seized Bakwanga (Kalonji's capital in South Kasai) without serious resistance: "In the next two days it temporarily put an end to the secession of Kasai."

Lincoln P. Bloomfield wrote in 1963,

[L]ocal authorities were sensitive of their new independence, nonetheless they were clearly waiting for someone to take action; indeed, the ONUC troops were initially welcomed as saviors from the Belgians. While relationships with the ANC (Armée Nationale Congolaise) were complicated by the latter's lack of responsible commanders at any level, in most instances the ANC during that first month did lay down arms wherever there were UN troops, and ONUC took over custody of arms, ammunition depots, and arsenals. Local UN commanders used their own judgment as to how to keep the Congolese troops under control, with outstanding success in many areas.

By February 1961, there were four leaders in the Congo: Antoine Gizenga (leading Lumumba's followers), Joseph-Désiré Mobutu, Tshombe, and the self-appointed King Albert Kalonji. There were four armed forces: Mobotu's ANC (numbering about 12,000), the South Kasai constabulary loyal to Albert Kalonji (3,000 or less), the Katanga Gendarmerie which were part of Moise Tshombe's regime (totalling about 10,000), and Stanleyville dissident ANC troops loyal to Antoine Gizenga (numbering about 8,000).

=== 1961 ===
Early in 1961, Patrice Lumumba was assassinated. UN Swedish troops witnessed Lumumba's transfer to Élisabethville after his capture by Mobutu's forces, and he was badly bruised and beaten. He was executed by a Katangan firing squad, and his body was dissolved in acid. Jawaharlal Nehru reacted sharply. Calling it "an international crime of the first magnitude", Nehru asked Hammarskjöld to take a tough line. When the Security Council passed a second resolution on 21 February 1961, Nehru agreed to send an Indian Army brigade of about 4,700 troops to the Congo and the 99th Indian Infantry Brigade was dispatched. The United Nations mission was strengthened and expanded in an effort to keep foreign mercenaries out of the country. The second UN resolution would restore order in the Congo (preventing civil war), oversee the withdrawal of all foreign advisors in the country, and attempt to reconvene the Congolese parliament. In August of that year, three of the four groups claiming control of the country reconciled with help from the United Nations. Parliament was restored, and a large civil war was prevented. Tshombe's breakaway Katanga province was not part of this reconciliation, and United Nations forces clashed with Tshombe's foreign mercenaries several times late in the year. The UN launched Operation Rum Punch under the command of Indian Army Brigadier-general K.A.S. Raja in August, a surprise attack that led to the peaceful surrender of 81 foreign mercenaries.

Hammarskjöld was flying to Rhodesia to negotiate peace talks between the government and Tshombe in response to Operation Morthor on 17 September 1961 when his plane crashed, killing him and everyone aboard. The crash was suspicious, and evidence exists that the plane was shot down. A 2016 book by Susan Williams uncovered evidence that a specially-equipped fighter plane from the Katanga Gendarmerie shot down Hammarskjöld's plane. He was succeeded as UN secretary-general by U Thant. Swedish troops were assigned to keep order in a large camp with about 40,000 refugees which was established in two weeks in August and September 1961.

After Hammarskjöld's death, U Thant took a more aggressive approach. UN troops from Sweden, Ireland, India, and Ethiopia were involved in heavy fighting for Katanga's capital, Élisabethville, in December 1961 and eventually took the city. During the fighting, eleven Swedish soldiers were taken prisoner; they were released on 15 January 1962 in exchange for Katangan gendarmes.

=== Operation Morthor ===
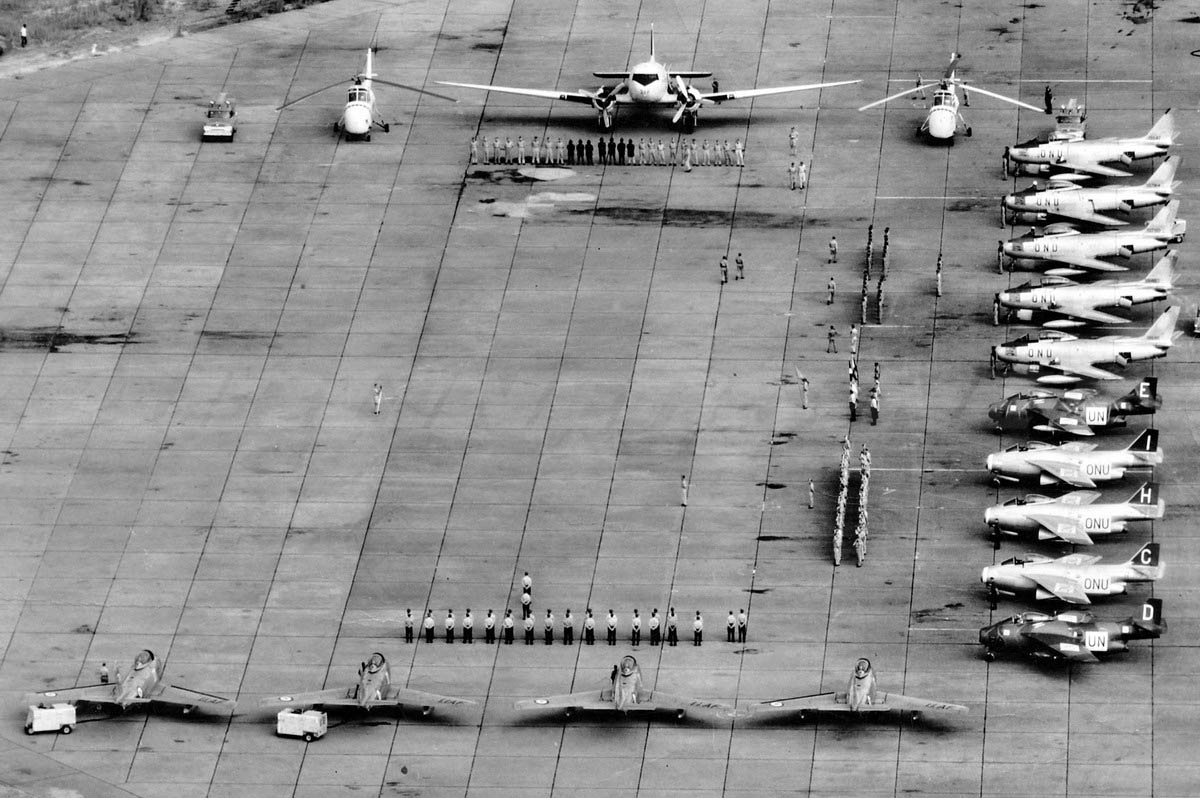
United Nations peacekeeping forces from Iran, the Philippines and Sweden at Kamina Air Base in January 1963

On 13 September 1961, the ONUC led an Indian brigade in Operation Morthor ("twist and break" in Hindi, a stepped-up version of Operation Rum Punch) and swiftly took Katanga. However, Hammarskjöld was not informed about the later operation.

The operation led to an eight-day military engagement between the ONUC and Katangese forces. Tshombe's mercenaries were prepared for the UN forces, and launched a counterattack. Thirteen UN troops and 200 Katangese civilians and troops were killed. Operation Morthor was executed without full approval by several UN member countries, particularly the UK, France, and the United States. The Soviet Union accused the US of supporting the assassination of Lumumba (a Soviet ally) and installing the American ally Mobutu as president, seeing the ONUC as acting as a proxy for the US rather than supporting the interests of the entire Security Council.

During the fighting, UN special representative in Katanga Conor Cruise O'Brien said that the Katanga secession movement was over. Although most observers interpreted that as meaning that the UN military forces had successfully defeated Tshombe's troops, O'Brien's announcement was premature.

During the Siege of Jadotville, a company of 155 Irish UN troops was attacked by Moise Tshombe's forces in Katanga. The Irish were outnumbered and outgunned but held out for six days (until they ran out of ammunition), inflicting heavy losses on Tshombe's foreign mercenaries without any of their own being killed.

=== End of Katangan secession ===
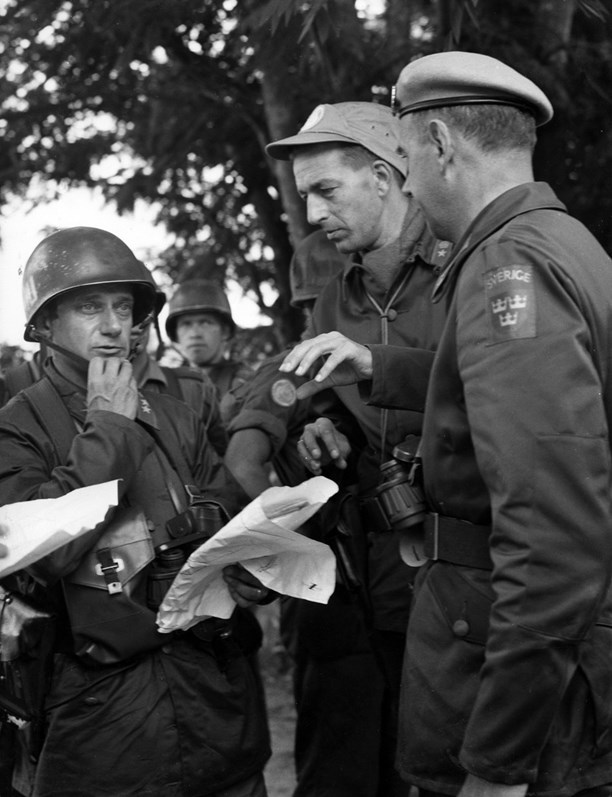
Swedish troops plan offensive actions for Operation Grandslam

The United Nations launched Operation Unokat in early December 1961, which put pressure on Tshombe to negotiatiate with Congolese prime minister Cyrille Adoula. In the 16 December attack on Camp Massart, the Katangese Gendarmerie stronghold was captured. Tshombe signed the 21 December Kitona Declaration, recognizing the authority of the central government and reintegrating Katanga into the Republic of the Congo. He then deferred to the Katangan parliament, however, and postponed any reconciliation. The rival Free Republic of the Congo government was subdued in January 1962, and the UN could refocus its efforts on ending the Katangan secession; contact between the central government and Katanga had broken down, and ONUC intelligence reports indicated that Katanga was rebuilding its forces.

In August 1962, Secretary-General U Thant drew up a Plan for National Reconciliation in which Katanga would rejoin a federalized Congo; Adoula and Tshombe accepted the proposal. Thant, wary of Tshombe's delaying tactics, applied increasing political pressure on the Katangan government to abide by the plan timetable. Still doubting the likelihood of a peaceful resolution of the Katangan secession, he sent Ralph Bunche to Léopoldville. Bunche worked with local UN mission chief Robert Gardiner and force commander Sean MacEoin to create a plan for freedom of movement of ONUC personnel and eliminate foreign mercenaries. By then, it was obvious that Tshombe did not intend to rejoin the Congo; there were 300 to 500 mercenaries in Katanga (as many as there had been before previous UN operations), and airfields and defensive positions were being constructed. ONUC personnel and consuls from troop-contributing supporters of ONUC faced increasing harassment by Katangan forces. The situation reached a breaking point on 24 December 1962, when Katangan gendarmes attacked peacekeeping forces in Katanga and led Thant to authorize a retaliatory offensive to eliminate secessionist opposition.

Major General Dewan Prem Chand launched Operation Grandslam on 28 December, and UN troops controlled downtown Élisabethville by the end of the day. Reinforced by recently amassed air power, United Nations peacekeepers completed the operation's first phase by the end of the year. In early January, United Nations forces turned their attention to southern Katanga's remaining strongholds. Indian peacekeepers exceeded their orders and crossed the Lufira River ahead of schedule, generating panic behind the Katangan lines and causing problems with the United Nations leadership. Tshombe, realizing that his position was untenable, sued for peace on 15 January 1963. Two days later, he signed an instrument of surrender and declared the Katangan secession over.

=== Final activities ===
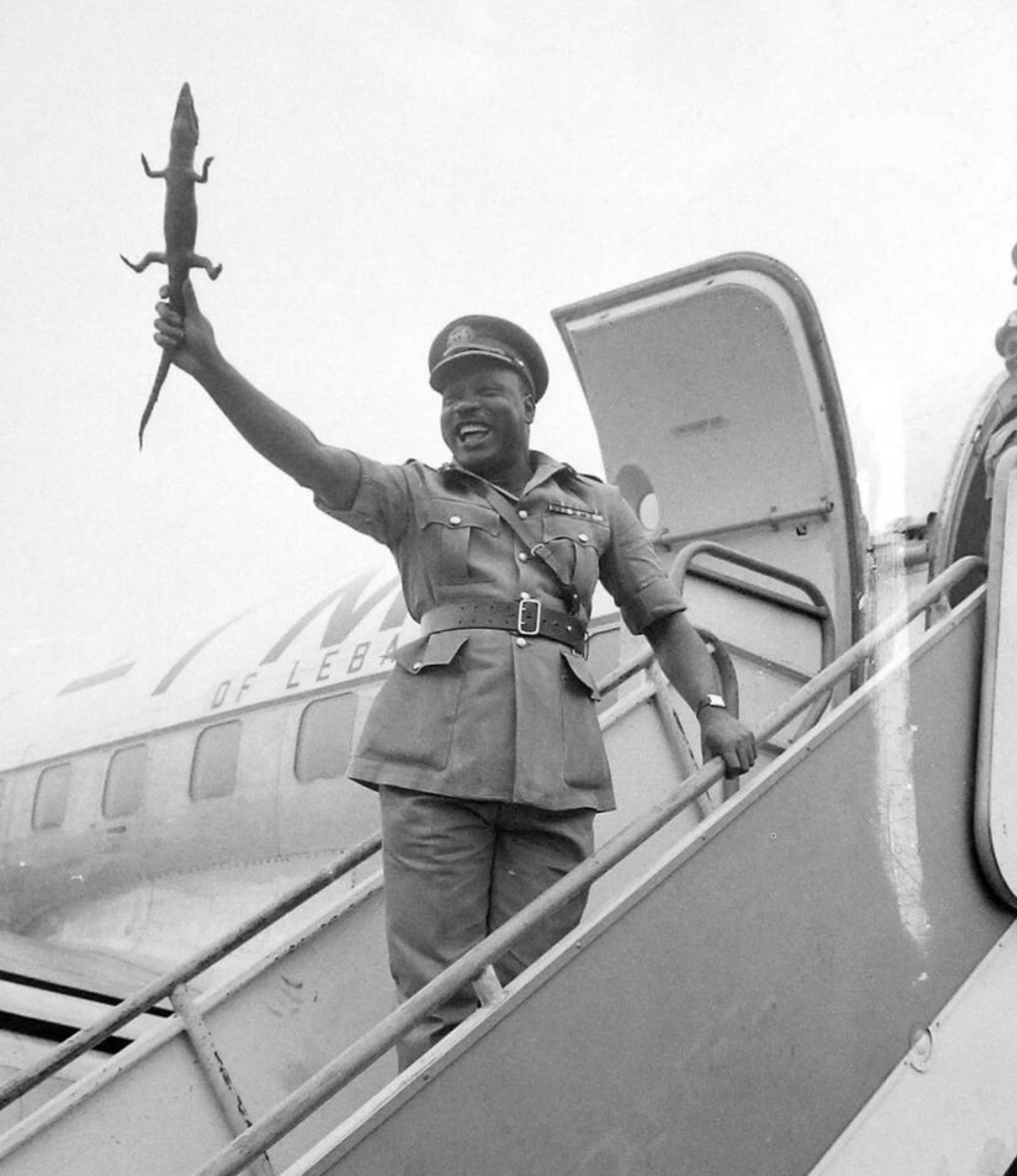
Major General Aguiyi-Ironsi waves his stuffed crocodile mascot as he leaves Leopoldville on 1 July 1964

After Operation Grandslam, the United Nations shrank its force significantly and kept only a small peacekeeping force in the country. By autumn 1963, plans were underway to remove the United Nations force from the Congo after the reincorporation of Katanga. At that time, six battalions of UN troops were stationed in Katanga; one battalion was in Luluabourg, one was at force headquarters, and administrative personnel were in Leopoldville.

Canadian Brigadier-general Jacques Dextraze was sent to the Congo in 1963 as mission chief of staff, effectively the deputy of the mission's military commander. The military headquarters, coordinated by Dextraze, was in the process of planning the mission's withdrawal in early 1964 as the Simba rebellion loomed. Dextraze launched a small-scale operation during Pierre Mulele's Kwilu Province uprising in January 1964 to save at least some of the threatened aid workers and missionaries under attack.

Troops began to withdraw in May 1964, beginning with the Irish unit in Kolwezi on 11 May and ending with units in Leopoldville in June. The United Nations maintained a civilian staff of 2,000 experts in the country in 1963 and 1964. The final group of peacekeepers, 85 men from the First Nigerian Battalion and 58 men from the 57th Canadian Signals, left N'djili Airport in Leopoldville on 30 June. The last soldier to leave was force commander Johnson Aguiyi-Ironsi.

=== Criticism of UN involvement ===
The UN was criticised a number of times during its involvement in the Congolese crisis about its handling of situations such as the death of Prime Minister Patrice Lumumba and the secession in Katanga. After Lumumba's death, many people believed that he should have been better protected by the organisation. The best-known demonstration against the UN about Lumumba's death was in New York, when African-American protesters pushed their way into the UN building and disturbed the General Assembly. The UN office in Belgium was also attacked.

The USSR also criticised UN involvement. Nikita Khrushchev addressed the General Assembly on 23 December 1960, noting the operation's controversial political direction and accusing the UN of responsibility for Lumumba's death with its moves favoring Lumumba's political opponents and its initial lack of willingness to deal with Katanga. According to Norrie Macqueen, the UN's peacekeeping approach in the Congo had no clear place in the Soviet view.

Khrushchev went on to criticise the secretary-general's role in the UN, saying that the position gave one person far too much power. He suggested a radical reform, replacing the position of secretary-general with a troika system. Khrushchev's proposal was rejected.

== National involvement and UN commanders ==
=== Indian Army ===
On 12 July 1960, after the Security Council adopted a resolution calling on Belgium to withdraw its forces and the UN to assist the Congolese government, Dag Hammarskjöld appointed senior Indian diplomat Rajeshwar Dayal (who would become India's foreign secretary) as his special representative. Lumumba's assassination shocked Jawaharlal Nehru, who reacted sharply. Calling it "an international crime of the first magnitude", he asked Hammarskjöld to take a tough line. When the Security Council passed a second resolution on 21 February 1961, Nehru agreed to send an Indian Army brigade of about 4,700 troops to the Congo. President Joseph Kasa-Vubu and Mobutu, who resented Dayal's and Nehru's support for Lumumba, objected strongly to the moves and threatened dire consequences for the UN mission if Dayal remained at its helm. At Hammarskjöld's request, Nehru agreed that Dayal should step down.

Indian Army involvement escalated. The 99th Indian Infantry Brigade launched Operation Morthor on 13 September, which quickly took control of Katanga. Major Krishnaswamy Sundarji, the staff officer who planned the operation, would become chief of the Indian Army. The British government sought to arrange the fateful meeting between Hammarskjöld and Tshombe in Ndola to negotiate a ceasefire. On the eve of Operation Rampunch, the UN had 5,720 troops in Katanga: 1,600 Indians, 500 Irish and 400 Swedes in Élisabethville, 1,200 Indians in Albertville, 1,000 Indians at Kamina Air Base, 500 Indians at Kabalo, 400 Ethiopians and Indians in Manono, and 120 Irish in Jadotville.

Nehru's support for the UN in the Congo was significant. India sent more troops than any country, and they were active throughout 1962 in defeating the secessionist forces. The UN forces were commanded by Indian officers who included major-general Dewan Prem Chand. Nehru did not insist on an immediate withdrawal of the Indian brigade during the Sino-Indian War, but called back the country's Canberra bombers. The troops returned after the mission was completed in March 1963.

=== Malayan Special Force ===
Malaya (now Malaysia) was invited to send a contingent to serve in ONUC. In response to the United Nations' request, Prime Minister Tunku Abdul Rahman offered a force of 120 men in a 4 August 1960 telegram to the secretary-general. The force was increased to 450 men in a 24 August telegram, settling at 613: 42 officers and 571 men of other ranks. The ONUC Malayan Special Force (MSF) was drawn from the Malayan Army's 4th Battalion, the Royal Malay Regiment, and C Squadron of the 2nd Reconnaissance Regiment (now 2 Armour).

=== Swedish Armed Forces ===
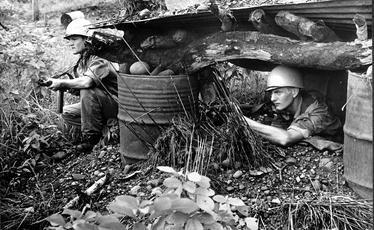
Swedish UN soldiers armed with submachine guns at an access road to Niemba in November 1961

Sweden had an active role in the UN force during the crisis. When Dag Hammarskjöld established ONUC, he organized it into two parts: military and civilian. Swedish major-general Carl von Horn headed the military, and Swedish diplomat Sture Linnér was responsible for the civilians. Both subject to the American Ralph Bunche, who was appointed head of the operation.

==== Air Force ====
In September 1961, responding to an appeal by the UN for military support, an initial force of five J 29Bs was stationed in the Republic of Congo as the F 22 Wing of the Swedish Air Force. It was reinforced by four more J 29Bs and two S 29C photo-reconnaissance Tunnans in 1962. F-86 Sabres operated by Italian, Iranian, Ethiopian and Filipino crews and Swedish J 29s were flown with the UN identifying legend on their fuselages.

Most of the missions involved attacking ground targets with internal cannons and unguided rockets. No aircraft were lost in action, despite large amounts of ground fire. The consensus of the crews and foreign observers was that the Swedish Tunnan's capabilities were exceptional. (The Katanga secessionists used a few Fouga Magisters and other aircraft with relatively poor air-combat capabilities.) The only aircraft lost was by a high-ranking officer who made a trial run and crashed during an aborted takeoff. Some of the Swedish aircraft were destroyed at their base when ONUC was ended in 1964, since they were no longer needed at home and the cost of retrieving them was considered excessive.

==== Army ====
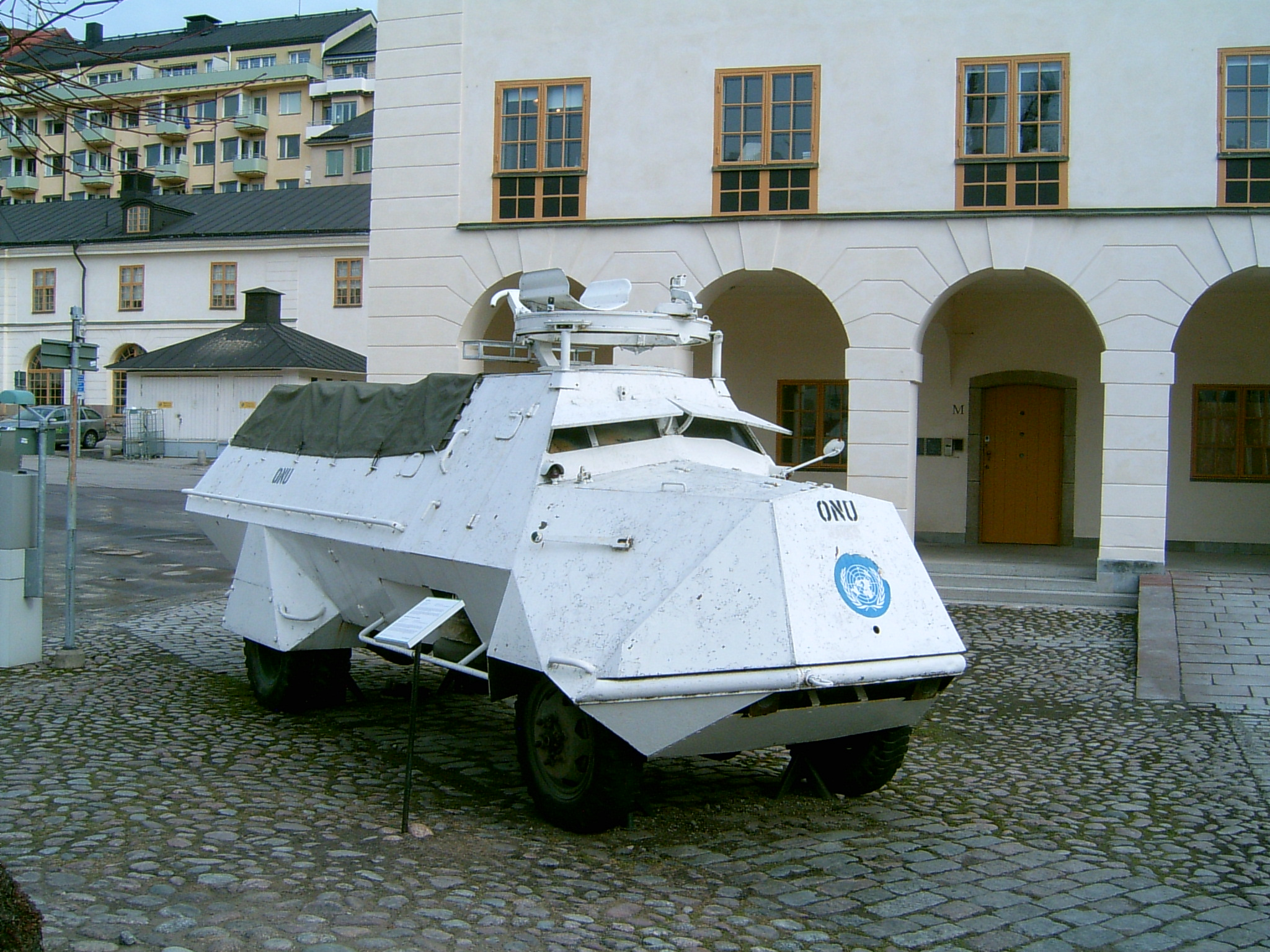
A Swedish Terrängbil m/42, painted as used in the Congo

From 1960 to 1964, the Swedish Army sent nine battalions to the Congo. Early in the crisis, when white people in the Congo became targets during the riots, Dag Hammarskjöld said that it was important to have white UN troops in the country. Hammarskjöld asked Sweden and Ireland to send a battalion each to more easily win white confidence than soldiers from African states would. The first Swedish battalion arrived in Congo from Gaza, where it had been deployed as part of UNEF) on 22 July 1960. Initially, the Swedes patrolled in Leopoldville and guarded the city's N'djili Airport.

Swedes (like other UN troops) had difficulty keeping track of the fluid and rapidly-changing political allegiances of the groups, and their fighting did not always have an obvious reason. In August they moved to Elizabethville in Katanga, where they encountered their first combat situation and had their first loss while escorting a train. The trains, which were carrying Katangan Baluba prisoners, were attacked by BaLuba (an ethnic group who supported the central government against Katanga).

The Swedes had to maintain order in a camp with about 40,000 BaLuba refugees in Kasai which was formed in two weeks in 1961, with refugees fleeing attacks in northern Katanga. In 1962, the Swedes moved to the Kamina base. On New Year's Eve 1962, UN troops advanced towards Kamina, cleared the gendarmes' roadblocks, and defeated the organized resistance.

The Congo Crisis was by far the most serious international task the Swedish Armed Forces faced during the Cold War, and it was the first time in 140 years that Swedish forces were forced into battle. During the crisis, 40 Swedish soldiers were injured and 19 killed. It was reported in 2004 that the bodies of two dead Swedes were eaten by local people, purportedly because cannibals were believed by some African groups to absorb the victim's strength. The Port Francqui incident, which was considered very sensitive by the UN and the Congolese government, had been covered up.

A total of 6,334 Swedes served in the Congo from 1960 to 1964. Eleven soldiers, including Stig von Bayer and Torsten Stålnacke, received the Swedish Vasa Medal for "extraordinary courage and commendable action to save human lives".

==== Swedish ONUC battalions, 1960–1964 ====
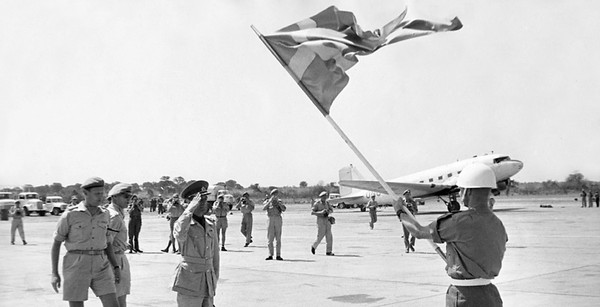
Major-general Curt Göransson salutes the Swedish flag and his UN troops on his arrival in Elizabethville. On his right are Colonel Jonas Wærn and Colonel Olaf Egge (with dark glasses).

Number	Strength	Commander	Service
VIII G	660	Col. Bernt Juhlin	May – November 1960
X K	533	Col. Anders Kjellgren	November 1960 – June 1961
XI G	603	Col. Gösta Frykman	April – November 1961
XII K	567	Col. Jonas Wærn	June – December 1961
XIV K	653	Col. Jonas Wærn	December 1961 – May 1962
XVI K	662	Col. Sten-Eggert Nauclér	May – October 1962
XVIII K	698	Col. Nils-Olof Hederén	October 1962 – April 1963
XX K	528	Col. Nils-Olof Hederén	April – December 1963
XXII K	303	Lt Col. Vollrath Tham	December 1963 – May 1964

The first Swedish UN battalion in Sinai in 1956 was named Battalion 1. This numbering continued until Battalion 9, which was deployed in Sinai and later in Gaza. After Battalion 9, the numbering was changed to odd numbers starting with 11 and with the additional letter G (for Gaza). Battalion 8 was transferred from Gaza to the Congo, and took the name Battalion VIII K (Kongo). Seven of the Congo battalions (10 to 22) were recruited to serve in ONUC, and the other two were Gaza battalions transferred to the Congo as reinforcements.

=== Irish Army ===
The Irish Army's first large deployment to the Congo was in 1960. The 32nd Infantry Battalion was the first deployment of Irish troops overseas and they were woefully ill-equipped. The standard uniform was a heavy bullswool tunic and trousers and the service rifle was the .303 Lee–Enfield. Issues with kit were eventually solved, new lightweight uniforms were issued and the FN FAL rifle replaced the Lee–Enfield. The Irish Battalions had a huge area to patrol and not much transport to patrol it with. Most patrols consisted of a couple of Land Rovers or Willys CJ3As, carrying soldiers armed with rifles, Gustav M45 submachineguns and Bren Guns. One such patrol was ambushed at Niemba on 8 November 1960 by Baluba tribesmen. Of the 11 Irish soldiers, 9 were killed and only 2 escaped, while 25 Baluba were also killed in the battle. Trooper Anthony Browne was posthumously awarded the Military Medal for Gallantry (the highest Irish military award) for giving his life to save his comrade. As a result of the ambush, the army equipped its contingent with 8 Ford armoured cars. These had been constructed in Ireland during the Second World War as a stop-gap armoured vehicle. Armament consisted of a single turret-mounted Vickers HMG. Modifications included extra ammunition storage, a searchlight and a cooling fan.

The most famous Irish action of the operation was the Siege of Jadotville where 150 Irish troops of "A" Company, 35th Battalion, held out against a much larger force of 3,000–5,000 Belgian, French, and Rhodesian led Katanga mercenaries and irregulars. The Irish fought until their ammunition ran out, inflicting hundreds of casualties on their opponents while suffering only several wounded. However, an attempt by Irish and Swedish reinforcements to relieve them failed, and in the end, the besieged Irish troops were forced to surrender.

A total of 6,000 Irish soldiers served in the Congo from 1960 until 1964, taking 26 casualties in that time. The Congo deployment resulted in greater investment by the government in personal kit and eventually, armoured personnel carriers.

=== Philippine Air Force ===
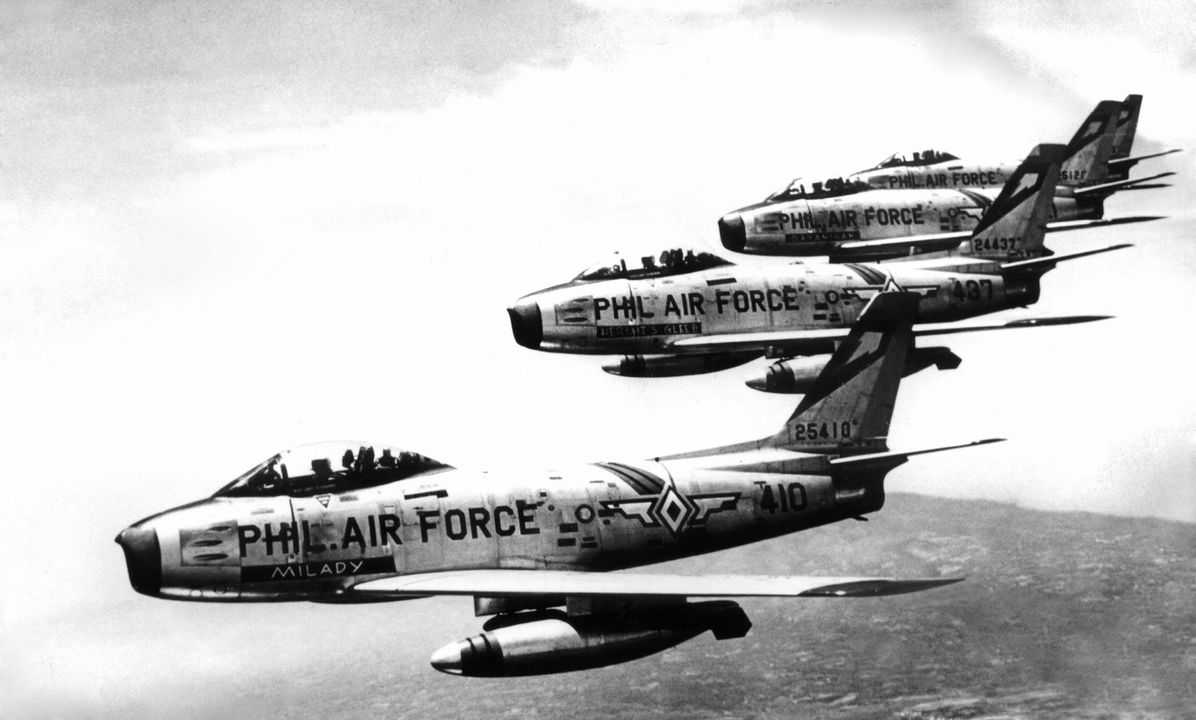
A squadron of F-86F Sabre of the Philippine Air Force

The UN Operations in the Congo would be the first international mission for the Philippine Air Force since it was founded in 1947. This was in response to the United Nations' call for member-states to support the on-going UN Operations in the Congo. Philippine President Diosdado Macapagal deployed the 9th Tactical Fighter "Limbas" Squadron of the Philippine Air Force.

The Philippine contingent left for the Congo on 11 February 1963. The PAF 9th Tactical Fighter operated from Kamina Air Base. The UN Combat Wing was composed of three fighter squadrons – the 22nd Swedish Squadron's J-29 Tunnan, the 103rd Iranian Squadron's F-86F Sabre and the Philippines' 9th Tactical Fighter Squadron's F-86E Sabre.

On 2 April 1963 a detachment of the PAF 9th Tactical Fighter Squadron was deployed to Elizabethville, conducting reconnaissance missions for sector command.

The Filipino airmen showed great resourcefulness and ingenuity in improvising an engine dolly, equipment vital for aircraft maintenance reducing a third of the man-hours normally required. The Filipinos also pioneered in civic action missions, teaching the Congolese the art of bamboo weaving and the manufacture of bamboo furniture thus improving the socio-economic conditions of the locals.

=== Canadian Army ===
When violence erupted in the Congo, Canada set aside an infantry brigade for United Nations use. Dag Hammarskjold refused Canada's offer to send the brigade to the Congo, saying: "If outside help was required to resolve the developing crisis, they preferred non-African states to be used as a last resort". The UN did not want to turn the Congo Crisis into a proxy war, and tried to pick peacekeepers from neutral countries. Canadian forces were suitable for a peacekeeping mission in the Congo because they were bilingual, however, which allowed them to communicate with the mostly-English-speaking UN troops, the French-speaking Belgian and Congolese forces, and the Congolese people.

The first request for assistance from the Congo asked the United Nations send technical assistance in support of the Force Publique, the Congo's armed forces. In response, "the secretary general suggested the dispatch of UN technical personnel to the Congo to assist in restoring order and discipline within the armed forces". Canadian National Defence assumed that the UN would ask for French-speaking military advisers; the army maintained a standby list of one hundred officers, including many who were bilingual and could be posted abroad on short notice. Before Hammarskjold could put his plan into action, a second Congolese request was sent to the secretary-general from President Joseph Kasa-Vubu and Prime Minister Patrice Lumumba. Canada again offered combat troops, saying that the country could "deploy one of three French speaking battalions made ready for UN Service". The offer for combat troops was again refused, although Hammarskjold accepted the Canadian French-speaking officers. Colonel Jean Berthiaume of the Royal 22e Regiment led the UN effort as the mission's first chief of staff. (Note: Spooner 2010, p. 107) Berthiaume, cited for his organizational skills, courage and "initiative, linguistic ability, and special aptitude for negotiating", was the first Canadian since World War II to become an officer of the Order of the British Empire.

Canadian signals and logistics personnel (quartermaster and maintenance personnel) were sent to the Congo. The Canadian signallers, who provided communications between headquarters and the front, were stationed at ONUC headquarters and at 10 signals stations spread throughout the Congo. Canada also sent a provost unit which attempted to provide law and order in the capital. In addition to the signals squadron, Canada sent an advance reconnaissance party of six officers from the United Nations Military Observer Group in India. The reconnaissance party found that "ONUC HQ personnel did not carry weapons and were able to move about freely without any trouble". The Canadian government, however, was concerned that their French-speaking peacekeepers might be mistaken for Belgian paratroops.

Canadian peacekeepers were attacked by Congolese troops several times, the first time at N'Djili Airport. Their commanding officer was knocked out, and Canadian soldiers were loaded onto a truck. After about ten minutes, the Canadians were rescued by a Danish officer and Ghanaian troops. The UN and Canada were outraged by the attack on Canadian peacekeepers, but praised the Canadian officer for not escalating the situation and responding with discretion. The Canadian soldiers were capable of firing on the Congolese troops in self-defence, but did not.

Although Canada was not in the Congo in a combat capacity, their involvement was scrutinized by the USSR. The Soviets began to attack Canadian involvement and demanded a troop withdrawal, accusing Canada of providing arms. The allegations were never proven, but the UN secretary-general transferred the RCAF contingent from airlift duty in support of the UN mission to a Pisa-Leopoldville airlift of food and aid. This move satisfied the Russians; instead of arguing against UN involvement in the Congo, the Soviets began to provide aid to Prime Minister Lumumba in Leopoldville. Lumumba's assassination and Hammarskjold's death led to the use of force by UN troops in the Congo. UN troops pushed into Katanga in 1961, and began routing Tshombe's forces. As "clashes between Tshombe and UN forces grew more frequent, the UN moved even more aggressively, and eventually took control of key parts of the province".

The greatest troop strength reached by the Canadian contingent in the Congo reached was 461. About 1,800 Canadians served among the 93,000 predominantly-African peacekeepers with the ONUC from 1960 to 1964, working chiefly as communications signallers and delivering via the Royal Canadian Air Force humanitarian food shipments and logistical support. Canadian participation stemmed more from overwhelming public opinion than the government of John Diefenbaker, according to historians Norman Hillmer and Jack Granatstein. Diefenbaker reportedly refused to comply with public calls for Canada to provide humanitarian relief to 230,000 Congolese famine victims in South Kasai in 1961 because "surplus foodstuffs should be distributed to unemployed persons in Canada" as a first priority. (Note: Spooner 2010, pp. 13–16, 128–130, 224 n.13) Two Canadians died from non-conflict-related causes and, of the 33 Canadians injured in the conflict, twelve received "severe beatings" by Congolese forces. Although Patrice Lumumba dismissed the first beatings, on 18 August 1960, as "unimportant" and "blown out of all proportion" in order for the UN to "influence public opinion", he attributed them a day later to the Armée Nationale Congolaise's "excess of zeal". Historians have described these incidents as cases of mistaken identity under chaotic circumstances in which Canadian personnel were mistaken by Congolese soldiers for Belgian paratroopers or mercenaries working for the Katanga secession.

Only a quarter of Canada's signallers extended their six-month tours of duty to a full year, and Canadian forces reportedly found the Congolese "illiterate, very volatile, superstitious and easily influenced"; a Canadian lieutenant-colonel persuaded Kivu Province's prime minister to accept a relief contingent from Malaysia by explaining that the Malaysians could divert bullets in flight away from their intended path. A recent study concluded that while the Canadian government "demonstrated a greater willingness to accommodate the Congolese prime minister Patrice Lumumba than other Western nations" and did not side with publicly either faction, it "[p]rivately ... favoured the more Western oriented [President] Kasavubu". Canada's troops earned the trust of Joseph Mobutu, who visited Canada in 1964 as president of Zaire and acknowledged Canada's support in maintaining his country's territorial integrity.

=== Ethiopia ===
Four hundred sixty Ethiopian troops were among 3,500 UN soldiers to arrive by 20 July 1960. This initial contingent would form the Tekil (or "Tekel") Brigade, which was stationed in Stanleyville. During the operation, about 3,000 members of the elite Kebur Zabagna (imperial bodyguard)—about 10 percent of the Ethiopian Army's strength at that time—were raised by Emperor Haile Selassie in addition to an air-force squadron. The Ethiopian 3rd Brigade provided decisive artillery support in the UN's siege of Kibushi in late 1962 and early 1963.

=== Ghana, Nigeria, and Egypt ===
Ghanaian and Nigerian troops served in the ONUC, the latter with the 99th Indian Infantry Brigade. The Nigerian 1st Battalion was among the last military forces in the country in 1964.

An Egyptian battalion apparently arrived by September 1960, but left by early 1961 after a dispute about the UN's role. On 26 January 1961, the secretary-general reported that the United Arab Republic (a union of Egypt and Syria) requested the repatriation of its contingent of about 510 by 1 February; the troops reportedly were a parachute battalion based in Lisala in Equateur Province, where visits by UAR Ilyushin aircraft concerned UN officials.

=== Indonesia ===
Indonesian Army deployment in the Congo
Contingent	Strength	Commander	Service
Garuda II	1,074	Col. Prijatna, Lt.Col. Solihin G. P.	September 1960 – May 1961
Garuda III	3,457	Brig.Gen. Kemal Idris, Col. Sabirin Mochtar	early 1962 – late 1963

=== Italian Air Force ===
Transport aircraft from the 46th Air Brigade (it:46ª_Brigata_aerea_"Silvio_Angelucci") of the Aeronautica Militare Italiana flew troops and equipment into the Congo between August 1960 and June 1962. Twenty-one men were killed, including thirteen in the November 1961 Kindu atrocity.

=== ONUC force commanders ===
- Major-general Carl von Horn, Sweden, July – December 1960 (transferred from UNTSO)
- Lieutenant-general Sean MacEoin, Ireland, January 1961 – March 1962
- Lieutenant-general Kebbede Guebre, Ethiopia, April 1962 – July 1963
- Major-general Christian Roy Kaldager, Norway, August – December 1963
- Major-general Johnson Aguiyi-Ironsi, Nigeria, January – June 1964

== Legacy ==
ONUC was the first UN peacekeeping mission to employ force to implement decisions by the Security Council, and was the first mission to enforce a no-fly zone and an arms embargo. During its first three years of its operation, ONUC improved the Congo's internal security. (Note: Lefever & Joshua 1966, p. 370) On the eve of the mission's departure, Adoula said by radio that it was a "decisive factor" in restoring the Congo's unity and set "an encouraging precedent" for intervention in emerging states. In later years, however, most Congolese came to view ONUC as an unwelcome foreign interference in their country's affairs. (Note: House 1978, p. 120)

== In popular culture ==
The Netflix film The Siege of Jadotville (2016, directed by Richie Smyth) is based on Declan Power's book, The Siege at Jadotville: The Irish Army's Forgotten Battle (2005). It tells the story of the Irish peacekeeping troop that held off Katangese and mercenary troops in the mining town of Jadotville, despite being heavily outnumbered.
