= Georges Olivet =

Swiss Red Cross delegate

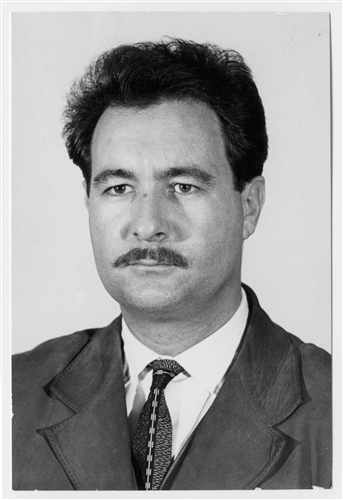
- Born: 19 August 1927. Nyon, Vaud, Switzerland
- Died: 13 December 1961 (aged 34); Elisabethville, State of Katanga
- Occupation: Delegate of the ICRC

Georges Olivet (19 August 1927 – 13 December 1961) was a Swiss delegate of the International Committee of the Red Cross.

== Early life ==
He was born in Nyon and grew up in Jussy.

== Career ==
After high school, he did an apprenticeship as an electrician and mechanic before doing further training in business. In the early 1950s, Olivet moved to the Belgian Congo working in textile imports.

Georges contacted the ICRC delegate in Léopoldville to offer his services. Following a short trip back to Switzerland, Georges assumed his duties as a delegate in late October, 1960. During the Congo Crisis Olivet provided humanitarian support in his role as an ICRC delegate within the secessionist State of Katanga.

The UN Representative in Katanga George Ivan Smith reported to the UN that Olivet "confirmed" to him that "Katanga military and mercenaries are making use of the Red Cross symbol to protect their military operations against the United Nations."

== Death ==
Olivet and two volunteers, Nicole Vroonen and Styts Smeding, were shot and killed while operating their ambulance during Operation Unokat on 13 December 1961. The results of a joint UN-International Red Cross investigation of the incident and the identity of their killers were not made public, but the UN paid a settlement to Olivet's family and Belgian news reports held an Ethiopian peacekeeper responsible.

== Burial and recognition ==
He was buried on 24 December. His body was repatriated to Geneva in April 1962 and cremated before being buried in Jussy, with ICRC President Leopold Boissier giving a eulogy.

Olivet was posthumously awarded the Medal of Belgian Gratitude.
