= Attack on Camp Massart =

- Part of Operation Unokat and the Congo Crisis
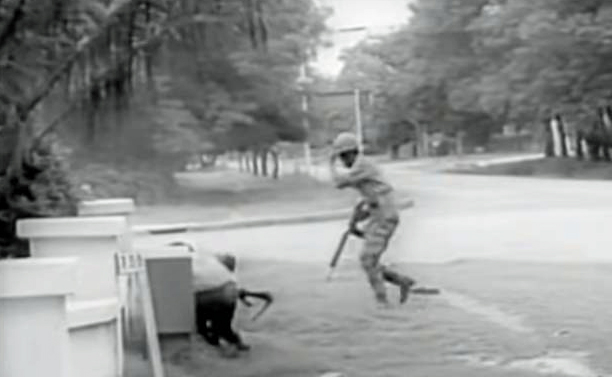
- Katangese gendarmes battling ONUC peacekeepers in Élisabethville
Date	16 December 1961
Location	Élisabethville, State of Katanga
Result	ONUC victory

Belligerents
(United Nations) ONUC: Sweden	Katanga: Katangese Gendarmerie; Foreign mercenaries

Commanders and leaders
Jonas Wærn; Ulf Mide	Moïse Tshombe

Strength
3 companies	350 men

Casualties and losses
1 killed; 5 wounded	10–20 killed; Unknown wounded; 8 captured

The Attack on Camp Massart (Note: Also called Camp Tshombe by Katangans.) took place on 16 December 1961 and was an attack on Camp Massart, the heavily defended main base of the Katangese Gendarmerie during the Congo Crisis. The attack was part of Operation Unokat which aimed to break the roadblocks set up by the gendarmerie by the end of November 1961 and at the same time stop Katangese President Moïse Tshombe's opposition to the UN. In a coordinated offensive, Swedish troops captured Camp Massart; Irish troops attacked the railway tunnel; the Indian contingent created diversionary attacks and blocked fleeing Katangese forces; and the Ethiopian forces secured the western part of the city. The attack on Camp Massart begun in the early hours of 16 December and ended at around 1 pm when the Swedes captured the camp. Between 10 and 20 Gendarmes were killed in the attack. One Swedish soldier was killed and five were injured.

== The attack ==
The 1st Brigade, which was under the command of Colonel Jonas Wærn, consisted of the Swedish and the Irish battalion. The Swedish battalion, led by Major Ulf Mide, included two platoons of the 3rd Company from the old 12th Battalion under Major Robert Ekengren of Dalarna Regiment. One platoon from the old 1st Company was in the operation under Ekengren's command. It also included two companies of the newly arrived 14th Battalion. One anti-aircraft squad with 20 mm AA automatic guns had been added.

The battalion's goal was to capture the gendarmerie main base, Camp Massart. Three companies of Katangese gendarmerie were in Camp Massart at the time of the attack. At 03.00 am, the battalion went into attack position. The 3rd Company's platoon Gullstrand constituted the advance party. At 03.40 am, nine (Indian, Irish and Swedish) mortars started firing which lasted for 35 minutes. 940 grenades were fired and of these grenades, 168 were fired in rafale for 10 minutes. The advance began and an extraordinarily strong tropical downpour filled in a few minutes the Kapemba stream which became a rushing river. The advance party got with difficulty wading across; a machine-gun squad moved the heavy Kulspruta m/42 machine gun across using a floating door. The rest of the company had to look toward the only bridge that existed. The new 1st Company that went to the left got over with the help of a rope. The new 2nd Company, which went to the right, managed to find a small boat. The attack was delayed. The advance took place under heavy enemy fire from mortars and machine guns, and from snipers in the buildings' upper floors. Some houses got cleaned out using armor piercing explosive shells, fired by Carl Gustaf 8.4cm recoilless rifle gunner Andersson from Skövde. The recoilless rifle gunner in the platoon Kamstedt, Lars Frost, excelled during the operation. Sub-machine guns and hand grenades were suitable close-quarters combat weapons for urban warfare.

The Swedes were unable to use their vehicles which were stuck in the mud. Instead, they stormed the bridge, which was under fire from Camp Massart. By 08.30 the distance was close enough, 30 meters from the Camp Massart's main entrance, which was partially blocked, for the Swedes to make a charge. The advance party (Gullstrand) secured the flanks with two machine guns and 3rd Company's 2nd Platoon (Kamstedt) stormed into the big military base. The Swedes stormed straight for the main entrance, which they captured after a fierce hand-to-hand fighting. The Gendarmes now regrouped and at 09.30 they went into a violent counter-attack. The attack was directed against the Swedes' left flank and was supported by fire from the surrounding houses inhabited by European employees of the Katangan railway company BCK. The Gendarmes attacked with rage and the Swedes again entered into hand-to-hand fighting. At 1 pm, the UN headquarters announced that the Swedes had definitely captured the area around the main entrance but that it would take the whole day would to clear the rest of Camp Massart. A few hours later, however, it was announced that Camp Massart had fallen and that the Swedes had complete control over the Katangese stronghold.

== Aftermath ==
During the attack on Camp Massart, one Swedish soldier was killed, private Lars Erik Öhrberg, and a few were wounded. Sergeant Leif Persson from Limhamn, 25, received a serious gunshot wound to the neck. Vice Corporal Erik Johansson, 29, from Tenhult, was injured by shrapnel in the right lung. Furir Jan Jonsson, 26, from Ramsele, was slightly wounded. Vice Corporal Leif-Ove Larsson, 20, from Vinberg, received minor shrapnel injuries. Vice Corporal Ove Eriksson, 21, from Stennäs in Västerbotten was also slightly wounded. Between 10 and 20 Katangese gendarmes were estimated to have died during the attack. The Swedes claimed to have taken eight prisoners, of which five were Europeans. Two snipers were caught red-handed. One of the captured Europeans claimed to be a "craftsman", had eight rifles. Another was wearing a Belgian paratrooper uniform and a blue beret of the type worn by UN soldiers.

Two days of lighter battles followed with the clearing of other resistance strongholds in the city. On 18 December Secretary-General U Thant declared a unilateral ‘temporary ceasefire’ and Tshombe began to negotiate with the central government. During the December fightings, three Swedes were killed, while 13 were wounded. A moderate figure in accordance with professional analysts, given the opponent's firepower. In total during the December fighting, 21 UN troops were killed and 84 wounded. Among the Katangans, 206 Gendarmes were killed and an unknown number wounded. The 12th Swedish Battalion was demobilized and flown back to Sweden where the Army Command received them.
