= Vollrath Tham =

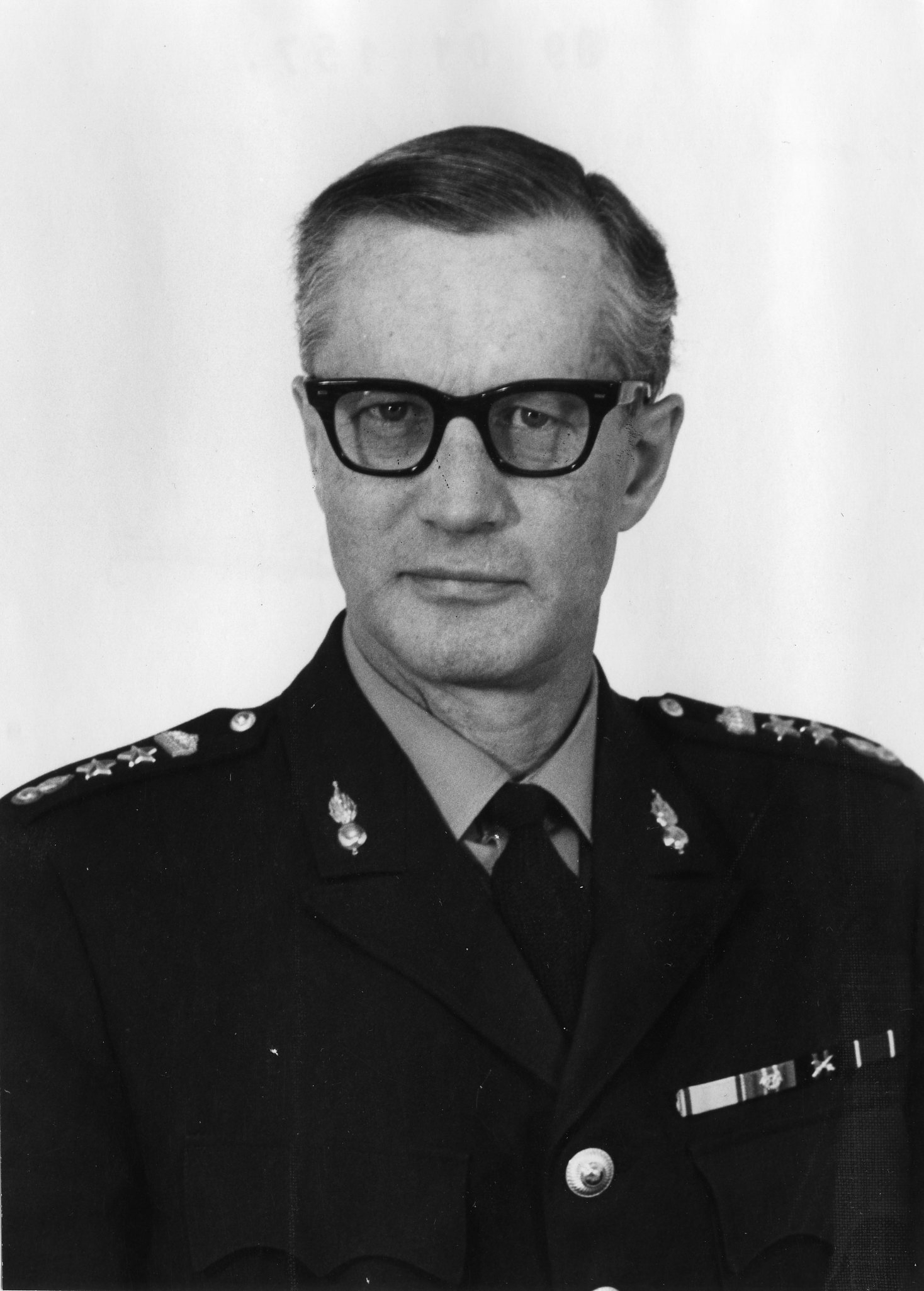
- Lieutenant Colonel Tham.
- Born: Vollrath Sebastian Adolf Wilhelm Tham; 3 December 1913
- Died: 28 January 1995 (aged 81); Uppsala, Sweden
- Burial place: Lidingö Cemetery
- Military career
- Allegiance: Sweden
- Branch: Swedish Army
- Service years: 1936–1968
- Rank: Lieutenant Colonel
- Nickname: "Vova"
- Units: Volunteer Corps (1939–40); ONUC (1963–64)
- Commands: Battalion XXII K
- Conflicts: Winter War; Congo Crisis

Vollrath Sebastian Adolf Wilhelm Tham (3 December 1913 – 28 January 1995) was a Swedish Army officer. Tham served in the Volunteer Corps during the Winter War in Finland and as battalion commander in Congo during the Congo Crisis. Tham retired as a lieutenant colonel in 1968.

== Early life ==
Tham was born on 3 December 1913, the son of August Vilhelm Vollrath Tham (1883–1938) and his wife Karin, née Berg (1882–1974).

== Career ==
Tham was commissioned as an officer in 1936 with the rank of second lieutenant and was assigned to Svea Artillery Regiment. Tham passed the Higher Artillery Course at the Artillery and Engineering College and attended the Swedish Army Physical Training School (Arméns gymnastik- och idrottsskola). He was promoted to Lieutenant in 1939. When the Winter War in Finland broke out in November 1939, Tham joined the Swedish Volunteer Corps as a fire control officer. He was present at the time when regimental comrade Lieutenant Colonel Magnus Dyrssen was killed.

In 1944, Tham was promoted to captain and in 1954 to major. He then served as a teacher at the Royal Swedish Army Staff College. In 1956 he transferred to Skaraborg Armoured Regiment but returned to the artillery in 1960 as a Lieutenant Colonel in Småland Artillery Regiment. From 1963 to 1964, Tham served as commander of the Swedish XXII K Battalion during the Congo Crisis. He retired from the military at Småland Artillery Regiment in 1968.

After completing military service, Tham ran his own engineering firm for oil sanitation issues.

== Personal life ==
Tham was married to Christina with whom he had two sons; Pehr and Gustaf.

== Death ==
Tham died on 28 January 1995 in Uppsala. The funeral service was held on 10 February 1995 at Vaksala Church in Uppsala. Tham was interred in a family grave in Lidingö Cemetery on 10 July 1995.

== Dates of rank ==
- 1936 – Second lieutenant
- 1939 – Lieutenant
- 1944 – Captain
- 1954 – Major
- 1960 – Lieutenant colonel

== Awards and decorations ==
- (Sweden) Knight of the Order of the Sword (1955)
- (Finland) 4th Class of the Order of the Cross of Liberty with Swords

Military offices
Preceded by Nils-Olof Hederén	Battalion Commander in the Congo; December 1963 – May 1964	Succeeded by None
