= Nils-Olof Hederén =

Swedish Army officer

- Born: 13 April 1908; Stockholm, Sweden
- Died: 9 January 1976 (aged 67)
- Burial place: Norra begravningsplatsen
- Military career
- Allegiance: Sweden
- Branch: Swedish Army
- Service years: 1931–1964
- Rank: Lieutenant colonel
- Nickname: "Olle"
- Units: South Scanian Infantry Regiment; ONUC; Jämtland Ranger Regiment
- Commands: Battalion XVIII K & XX K in Congo
- Conflicts: Congo Crisis

Nils-Olof "Olle" Hederén (13 April 1908 – 9 January 1976) was a Swedish Army officer. He served as commanding officer of the South Scanian Infantry Regiment and Jämtland Ranger Regiment. Hederén also served as battalion commander in Congo during the Congo Crisis.

== Early life ==
Hederén was born on 13 April 1908 in Stockholm, Sweden, the son of Anton Hederén, an engineer, and his wife Agnes Ohlsson. He passed studentexamen in 1928.

== Career ==
=== Early career ===
Hederén was commissioned as an officer in 1931 and was assigned to the South Scanian Infantry Regiment (I 7) as a second lieutenant. He served as a teacher at the Swedish Infantry Combat School from 1936 to 1939 and attended the Royal Swedish Army Staff College from 1940 to 1942 and was again a teacher at the Infantry Combat School from 1942 to 1946. He became major in the staff of the I Military District in 1949 and served in the British Army in 1951 and in 1952. Hederén served in the Jämtland Ranger Regiment (I 5) in 1953 and was promoted to lieutenant colonel there in 1957. In 1958 Hederén served in the French Army and in 1959 he served at the Army Staff. Hederén was appointed Inspector of the Infantry in the Army Staff in 1959. Beside his military career, Hederén was also chairman of the I 5's Shooting Association (I 5:s skytteförening) from 1954 to 1959, secretary in the Swedish Shooting Sport Federation from 1945 to 1947 and Secretary General of the 1947 ISSF World Shooting Championships. He was also a board member of Jämtland County Shooting Association from 1954 to 1959, Swedish Military Sports Federation in 1958 and of the International Modern Pentathlon Union in 1960.

=== Congo Crisis ===
Hederén served with the acting rank of colonel as commander of the Swedish Battalion XVIII K from October 1962 to April 1963 and commander of the Swedish Battalion XX K from April 1963 to December 1963. He was the military chief of the Kamina Base and Sector Kamina in the State of Katanga. During this time, the Katangan resistance against Congo's central government was definitively crushed and the breakaway province of Katanga was integrated back into the Congolese government formation. Hederén experienced the final stage of the UN's mandate at the Kamina Base, since it had been maintained and guarded by UN staff for nearly four years. He was the initiator of the reconstruction of the Bukama Bridge and of a major medicine collection for the benefit of the population of Sector Kamina.

=== Later career ===
In 1964 he had been transferred to the reserve. After retiring from the military, Hederén was hired by Sveriges Kreditbank as security manager. He stayed in this position until 1973.

== Personal life ==
On 22 October 1938 he married Gunilla Breitholtz (1915–1995), the daughter of captain Gösta Breitholtz and Eva Breitholtz. He was the father of Eva Hederén Flygt (born 1941) and Suzanne Hederén Hultberg (born 1945).

== Death ==
Hederén died on 9 January 1976. The funeral service was held on 16 January 1976 at Gustaf Adolf Church in Stockholm. He was buried at Norra begravningsplatsen in Stockholm on 17 May 1976.

== Dates of rank ==
- 1931 – Second lieutenant
- 19?? – Lieutenant
- 19?? – Captain
- 1949 – Major
- 1957 – Lieutenant colonel
- 1963 – Colonel (acting rank during 1963)

== Awards and decorations ==
=== Swedish ===
- (Sweden) Knight of the Order of the Sword (1950)
- (Sweden) Jämtland County Schooting Association's Gold Medal (Jämtlands läns skytteförbunds guldmedalj)
- (Sweden) National Federation of Swedish Women’s Auxiliary Defence Services' Silver Medal (Riksförbundet Sveriges lottakårers silvermedalj)
- (Sweden) Northern Scania Officers Union's Silver Medal (Norra skånska befälsförbundets silvermedalj)
- (Sweden) Swedish Sport Shooting Association's Silver Medal (Svenska sportskytteförbundets silvermedalj)

=== Foreign ===
- (Denmark) Knight of the Order of the Dannebrog
- (Denmark) King Christian X's Liberty Medal
- Knight First Class of the Order of the Lion of Finland
- Finland Shooting Association's Gold Medal of Merit (Finlands skytteförbunds förtjänstmedalj i guld)
- (Norway) Norwegian Shooting Association's Silver Medal (Norges skytteförbunds silvermedalj)

== Bibliography ==
- Hederén, Olle (1965). Afrikanskt mellanspel: en berättelse om händelserna på Kaminabasen 1960-1964 (in Swedish). Östra Ryd: L.G. Säflund. SELIBR 692014.

Military offices
Preceded by Sten-Eggert Nauclér	Battalion Commander in the Congo; October 1962 – December 1963	Succeeded by Vollrath Tham
