= George Ivan Smith =

George Ivan Smith AO (11 July 1915 – 21 November 1995) was an Australian radio and war correspondent, movie director, diplomat, poet and writer. He was born 11 July 1915 George Charles Ivan Smith in Sydney, New South Wales, Australia. He is the first son of George Franklin Smith, a New South Wales prison governor, and May Sullivan.

== Personal ==
In 1935 he married Madeleine LaBarte Oakes (1909–1966) of Maryborough, Queensland: children George Ivan Smith 1937 deceased, Antony Ivan Smith (Ivansmith) (1939–2008) and Sharon Morreale 1940. In 1944 he married Mary Stephanie Douglass; stepchildren Penelope Gilliatt, a writer (1932–1993), Angela Conner (1935), a sculptor, and an adopted daughter Edda Mwakeselo Ivan-Smith 1960, author and Social Development Consultant. Ivan Smith died in 1995 in Stroud, Gloucestershire.

Ivan Smith is his full last name and not hyphenated, though often he is categorized under the last name Smith.

== Life and career ==
After education at Bathurst, New South Wales and then Goulburn High School where his father George Franklin Smith was prison governor at the Goulburn Gaol. After graduation Ivan Smith began work as a cub newspaper journalist for the Sydney Truth.

In 1937 he joined the Australian Broadcasting Commission and managed 2WL a radio station in Wollongong. Later Michael Pate who began his famous career in 1938, when he joined Ivan Smith writing and broadcasting a program called Youth Speaks for ABC Radio.

In 1939 became he talk's editor and a founding member of the new overseas short wave broadcasting service, "Australia Calling" (1939–1941) later named Radio Australia. In 1941 Ivan Smith was seconded to the BBC Overseas Service in London, England where he became director of the Pacific Service and organised overseas coverage of the Second Front. In 1945 he joined the J. Arthur Rank Organisation, where he worked as producer, editor and director of This Modern Age with Sergei Nolbano, a documentary series of films for J. Arthur Rank (1945–1947).

Ivan Smith joined the United Nations in 1947 and went to New York as Senior Director of External Affairs to establish the organisation's first international radio programmes for the United Nations Information Services, then at Lake Success, New York (1947–1949). In 1949 he came to Britain as first director of the London United Nations Information Centre, remaining there until 1958. During that time he was closely associated with Dr. Ralph Bunche and the UN Secretary-General Trygve Lie in developing the 1949 Armistice Agreements that ended the 1948 Arab–Israeli War.

After Trygve Lie's resignation in 1952, he acted frequently as spokesman for Dag Hammarskjöld, who had become secretary-general in 1953. He accompanied him on many missions, including his visit to the Middle East following the Suez Crisis on 1956–57. After which he co-ordinated salvage operations with American salvage companies of the sunken ships that blocked the Suez Canal.

He was also in charge of press liaison at the Four Powers' summit conference and foreign ministers' meeting in Geneva in 1955 and worked closely with James Hagerty President Dwight Eisenhower's press secretary. In 1958 Ivan Smith returned to New York, firstly as Director of the External Relations Division of the UN Office of Public Information and later as Senior Director Public Information of Press and Publications, United Nations, New York.

== Africa ==
In 1961, he was appointed United Nations Representative Katanga by Secretary General Dag Hammarskjöld. Where he and his colleague Sir Brian Urquhart were kidnapped and beaten by Katangese paratroopers in the presence of US Senator Thomas Dodd. Senator Dodd was visiting the secessionist leader Moïse Tshombe and was his strongest supporter in the US Senate. A State Department employee, Lewis Hoffacker, attempted to stop the kidnapping and managed to get Ivan Smith away from his abductors by pulling him from a truck; Senator Dodd was being feted at a private home in Elizabethville at the time. Ivan Smith was able to then contact the commander of the UN Indian forces, Colonel S. S. Maitro and who effected Urquhart's release shortly afterwards, albeit in badly beaten condition.

Ivan Smith was then appointed the personal Representative of the Secretary General U Thant in East and Central Africa 1962–1966 as well as the Regional Director of United Nations Technical Assistance Programmes in Central Africa.

In 1964 he delivered the Boyer Lecture for ABC (Australian Broadcasting Commission) titled "Along the Edge of Peace". 1965 he was nominated for the new post of secretary-general of the Commonwealth but the appointment went to his namesake Arnold Smith of Canada after severe pressure from Australian Prime Minister Robert Menzies over his work in Africa.

== Later years ==
In 1966 Ivan Smith returned from Africa to become a visiting Professor at Princeton University and The Fletcher School of Law and Diplomacy (1966–1968). After this last tenure he again became Director of United Nations Office London England (1968–1974). During 1967 he also worked for the World Security Trust on the problems of nuclear proliferation and acted as consultant to various international corporations.

In his retirement to Stroud, Gloucestershire he authored Ghosts of Kampala, a biography of Idi Amin and contributed numerous articles and letters to the press to include an obituary of Laurence Olivier. He was awarded the Officer the Order of Australia (AO) by Queen Elizabeth II of the United Kingdom in London on Australia Day 1992 for Service to International Relations.

His collection of photographs, papers and letters were donated to the Bodleian Library at the University of Oxford. He was a very close friend of over the years with many individuals he met in the course of his career. Danny Kaye who would come to London with Jerry Lewis and appear in special UNICEF performances. He carried on constant communications with friends and associates such as Gareth Evans, Paul Keating and Rupert Murdoch and much earlier his mentor James Joyce these documents all reside at the Bodleian Library.

== Publications ==
- Poetry London X 1944 Editions Poetry London, page 154. Anthology of The best War Time London Verse.
- Adventure and Discovery 1946 Jonathan Cape Miracle Drugs" page 155
- The Term of his Natural Life: Marcus Clarke, with an Introduction by George Ivan Smith, Collins. 1953.
- Ghosts of Kampala: The Rise and Fall of Idi Amin first published by Weidenfeld and Nicolson (London)(1980.
