= Anders Kjellgren =

- Born: Lars Anders Thorsten Kjellgren; 10 October 1913; Karlstad, Sweden
- Died: 4 February 2006 (aged 92); Sandhult, Sweden
- Military career
- Allegiance: Sweden
- Branch: Swedish Army
- Service years: 1934–1974
- Rank: Colonel
- Commands: Battalion X K in Congo; UN chief for South Katanga; Västernorrland Regiment
- Conflicts: Congo Crisis

Lars Anders Thorsten Kjellgren (19 October 1913 – 4 February 2006) was a Swedish Army officer.

== Early life ==
Kjellgren was born on 19 October 1913 in Karlstad, Sweden, the son of Swedish National Bank director Torsten Kjellgren and his wife Elsa (née Sandwall).

== Career ==
Kjellgren was an officer cadet in Uppland Regiment (I 8) and became a second lieutenant in Älvsborg Regiment (I 15) in 1934 and lieutenant in 1936. Kjellgren attended the Royal Swedish Army Staff College from 1941 to 1943, was promoted to captain in 1942 and served at the General Staff in 1945. Kjellgren was section chief at the Defence Staff from 1945 to 1948, section chief at the Army Staff in 1948 and attended Staff College, Camberley in 1949.

He served in the Life Regiment Grenadiers (I 3) in 1950 and was section chief at the Army Staff from 1950 to 1951 and became major at the General Staff in 1952 and attended the Swedish National Defence College in 1952. Kjellgren was head of department at the Army Staff from 1952 to 1958 and was promoted to lieutenant colonel in 1957. He served in Norrbotten Regiment (I 19) in 1958.

Kjellgren served in Congo during the Congo Crisis from 1960 to 1961. He was commander of the Swedish Battalion X K from November 1960 to June 1961. In January 1961 he succeeded the Irish Colonel Byrnes as commander of the UN troops in southern Katanga. He then commanded the Swedish battalion, one Irish and two Moroccan battalions, one Indian signals company and one Italian field hospital. Kjellgren was also for some time at the UN's disposal for the reorganization of the Congolese Army.

Back in Sweden he was promoted to colonel in 1963 and was regimental commander of Västernorrland Regiment (I 21) from 1963 to 1974. Kjellgren participated in the elaboration of the Army Regulation in 1951 and the Infantry Regulation in 1954. Kjellgren was a member of the municipal council in Borås from 1979 to 1985.

== Personal life ==
In 1939 he married Ann-Marie Fröberg (born 1915), the daughter of the district land-surveyor Herman Fröberg and Hilda (née Resare). Kjellgren was the father of Anders (born 1940), Göran (born 1943) and Claes (born 1947).

Kjellgren was a supporter of equestrianism. Another of his interests was painting. Upon his retirement, he donated, as per tradition, his portrait to the officer corps. The portrait had been painted by himself, which are known not to have happened before.

== Awards and decorations ==
=== Swedish ===
- (Sweden) Commander 1st Class of the Order of the Sword (5 June 1971)
- (Sweden) Commander of the Order of the Sword (6 June 1967)
- (Sweden) Central Board of the National Swedish Rifle Association's silver medal (Sveriges skytteförbunds överstyrelses silvermedalj)

=== Foreign ===
- (Norway) King Haakon VII Freedom Cross
- United Nations Medal (ONUC)

== Bibliography ==
- Kjellgren, Anders (1959). Sverige och ytkriget: randstatens försvarsproblem i atomåldern. Militärlitteraturföreningen, 99-0119708-2; 226 (in Swedish). Karlskrona: [Militärlitteraturfören.] SELIBR 1460956.

Military offices
Preceded by Bernt Juhlin	Battalion Commander in the Congo; November 1960 – June 1961	Succeeded by Gösta Frykman
Preceded by Stig Synnergren	Västernorrland Regiment; 1963–1974	Succeeded by Bengt Sjöberg
