= Gösta Frykman =

- Born: Gösta Oskar Vilhelm Frykman; 11 March 1909; Vilhelmina, Sweden
- Died: 26 February 1974 (aged 64); Saltsjöbaden, Sweden
- Burial place: Galärvarvskyrkogården, Stockholm
- Military career
- Allegiance: Sweden
- Branch: Swedish Army
- Service years: 1933–1961
- Rank: Lieutenant Colonel
- Commands: Swedish UN battalion XI G
- Conflicts: Congo Crisis

Gösta Oskar Vilhelm Frykman (11 March 1909 – 26 February 1974) was a Swedish Army officer.

== Early life ==
Frykman was born on 11 March 1909 in Vilhelmina, Sweden, the son of chief park ranger (överjägmästare) Dan Frykman and his wife Emy (née Forsgrén). He passed studentexamen in 1929.

== Career ==
Frykman was commissioned as an officer and was assigned as a second lieutenant to Älvsborg Regiment (I 15) in 1933. Frykman attended the Royal Swedish Army Staff College from 1940 to 1942, served as a press officer in the Defence Staff from 1943 to 1946 and was captain of the General Staff Corps in 1944. In 1946 he served as press officer in the camp staff during the Swedish extradition of Baltic soldiers.

He was military organizer at the defense exhibition in Gävle in 1946 and became major at the Swedish Infantry Combat School in 1954. Frykman was lieutenant colonel at Skaraborg Regiment (P 4) in 1957 and was commander of the Swedish UN battalion in Gaza in 1961 which was part of United Nations Emergency Force. The same year his battalion was redeployed to the Congo during the Congo Crisis where he was commander of the Swedish UN battalion XI G from April 1961 to November 1961.

== Other work ==
Frykman was a member of the inquiry within the Swedish National Board of Information (Statens informationsstyrelse) from 1941 to 1943 and chairman of the board of Fastigheter AB Bergslagen.

== Personal life ==
On 4 April 1936 he married Ingrid Schollin-Borg (1914–2004), the daughter of captain Peter Schollin-Borg and Märtha (née Liedberg). He was the father of Jan Christer (born 1939), Jan Peter (born 1942), Åke (born 1944), Eva (born 1946) and Ingrid (born 1954).

== Death ==
He died on 26 February 1974 in Saltsjöbaden and was interred on 20 March 1974 at Galärvarvskyrkogården in Stockholm.

== Awards and decorations ==
- (Sweden) Knight of the Order of the Sword (1953)
- United Nations Medal
- (Sweden) Stockholm Defence Committee's Badge of Merit in silver (Stockholms försvarskommittés förtjänsttecken i silver)

Military offices
Preceded by Anders Kjellgren	Battalion Commander in the Congo; April 1961 – November 1961	Succeeded by Jonas Wærn
