= Sten-Eggert Nauclér =

Swedish Army officer

- Born: Sten-Eggert Vergenhanns Nauclér; 24 September 1914; Boden, Sweden
- Died: 5 November 1990 (aged 76)
- Military career
- Allegiance: Sweden
- Branch: Swedish Army
- Service years: 1939–1963
- Rank: Major
- Nicknames: "Stessan", "Stessa"
- Commands: Battalion XVI K in the Congo; National Home Guard Combat School
- Conflicts: Winter War; Continuation War; Korean War; Suez Crisis; Congo Crisis; Biafran War

Sten-Eggert Vergenhanns Nauclér (24 September 1914 – 5 November 1990) was a Swedish Army officer who served in various conflict areas, in Swedish service, Ethiopian service and as a volunteer. After a few years in the Swedish Army, Nauclér volunteered for service in the Winter War and later in the Continuation War in Finland. He returned to Sweden where he was promoted to captain in 1948 before travelling to Ethiopia to train officers for Emperor Haile Selassie's Imperial Guards. Nauclér was deployed in Korea with the Kagnew Battalion during the Korean War in 1951 and also served as head of the Ethiopian Liaison Section in Tokyo. In 1956 he was deployed in Egypt with the Swedish UN Battalion during the Suez Crisis and later in the Congo where he was commander of the Swedish UN Battalion during the Congo Crisis. Nauclér retired from the military in 1963 and then worked for a mining corporation in Liberia. During the Biafran War he led a Red Cross team with relief efforts.

== Early life ==
Nauclér was born on 24 September 1914 in Boden and was the son of lieutenant colonel Carl-Eggert Nauclér and Harriet (née Vasseur). He passed studentexamen in Stockholm in 1936.

== Career ==
Nauclér was commissioned as an officer in 1939 and was assigned as a second lieutenant to the Life Grenadier Regiment (I 4) in 1939. He served as a platoon leader in the Swedish Volunteer Corps during the Winter War in Finland from 1939 to 1940. Furthermore, Nauclér was platoon leader and battalion commander during the Continuation War in Finland from 1941 to 1942 and back in Sweden he completed the general course at the Artillery and Engineering College in 1945. He was a teacher at the Swedish Infantry Combat School in 1945 and was promoted to captain in 1948.

The same year Nauclér travelled to Ethiopia together with lieutenant colonel Rickard Nilsson, captain Bengt Horn and captain Vilhelm av Sillén. There he became a cadet officer at the Haile Selassie I Cadet School and was training Ethiopian youths to be officers in Emperor Haile Selassie's Imperial Guards. In 1951, Nauclér and the Swede Orvar Nilsson was commissioned into the Kagnew Battalion which was going to be deployed in Korea. Both Nauclér and Nilsson had twice previously been granted temporary leave from the Swedish Army to serve first in the Winter War and then the Continuation War, but were now denied. Instead, they asked for dismissal from the Swedish service, which was immediately granted. They were both hired as majors in Emperor Haile Selassie's Imperial Guard, switched to Ethiopian uniforms and flew by private plane carried by an Ethiopian pilot to Djibouti, where they joined the battalion as advisers. The journey from Djibouti, via Bangkok to Pusan in the American troopship USS General J. H. McRae took three weeks. It arrived in the Port of Pusan in the morning 6 May 1951, where the South Korean President Syngman Rhee and representatives of the UN forces in Korea were waiting. After disembarking, they were transported to a training camp about 10 km outside Pusan, where they were placed in tents.

Nauclér served as chief adviser to the Ethiopian Kagnew Battalion during the Korean War from 1951 to 1952 and as Ethiopian consul and head of the Ethiopian Liaison Section at the UN Commander in Chief General Matthew Ridgway's headquarters in Tokyo from 1951 to 1952. After his tour in Korea, Nauclér returned to Sweden. In 1956 he was appointed major and chief of Section III and the staff company of the Swedish UN Battalion I in Egypt. Nauclér was also head of the Swedish monitoring police at the Suez Canal in the aftermath of the Suez Crisis in 1957 and he was promoted to major in the Swedish Army in 1959. Nauclér was colonel and commander of the Swedish UN Battalion XVI K in Congo during the Congo Crisis from May 1962 to October 1962 and he was sector commander in Katanga in 1962. Back in Sweden again, he was commander of the National Home Guard Combat School from 1957 to 1963 when he retired from military service. From 1963, Nauclér was chief of staff in Yekepa, Liberia for the mining corporation Lamco. A few years later he led the International Red Cross team in Biafra during the Biafran War. In the 1970s, Nauclér worked for the Red Cross in Zambia. He served in the Red Cross Associations' Secretariat in Geneva and as the Red Cross's chief delegate in Uganda. He was the Red Cross's chief delegate in Ethiopia in 1974 and the Swedish Red Cross representative in The Gambia in 1974-75. The last Red Cross mission in Uganda in 1981 nearly cost him his life. His heart was failing and he had to return home.

== Personal life ==
In 1941 he married Gunn Johansson, the daughter of managing director Carl Johansson and his wife, (née Nilsson). He was the father of Marianne (born 1941), Carl-Eggert (born 1944) and Anders (born 1947). Nauclér was a member of Rotary International.

== Awards and decorations ==
=== Swedish ===
- (Sweden) Knight of the Order of the Sword (1959)
- (Sweden) Home Guard Medal of Merit in Gold (6 June 1963)
- (Sweden) Swedish Red Cross Merit Badge (Svenska Röda Korsets förtjänsttecken)

=== Foreign ===
- Officer of the Order of the Star of Ethiopia
- (Ethiopia) Ethiopian Memorial Medal of the Korean War
- (Finland) 3rd Class of the Order of the Cross of Liberty with swords
- (Finland) 4th Class of the Order of the Cross of Liberty with swords and oak leaves
- (Finland) 4 x Finnish Memory Cross on the occasion of the Finnish war 1939-45 (Finskt minneskors med anledning av Finlands krig 1939-45)
- (Finland) Finnish War Memorial Medal (Finsk krigsminnesmedalj)
- United Nations Emergency Force Medal
- United Nations Korea Medal
- Memorial Medal of the Korean War

Military offices
Preceded by Jonas Wærn	Battalion commander in the Congo; May 1962 – October 1962	Succeeded by Nils-Olof Hederén
