= Jonas Wærn =

Swedish Army officer (1915–2003)

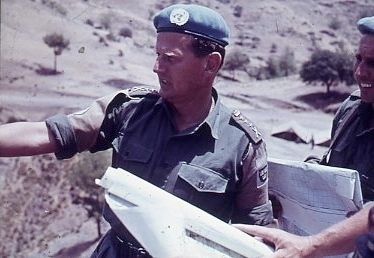
- Wærn circa 1964
- Born: 23 July 1915; Spånga, Sweden
- Died: 6 November 2003 (aged 88); Drottningholm, Sweden
- Burial place: Norra begravningsplatsen, Stockholm
- Military career
- Branch: Swedish Army
- Service years: 1941–1969
- Rank: Lieutenant colonel
- Commands: ONUC (BDE/BN CO 1961–62); UNFICYP (BN CO 1964)
- Conflicts: Congo Crisis; Cyprus dispute
- Other work: Cabinet chamberlain Governor of Gripsholm Castle; Governor of Strömsholm Palace

Carl Jonas Wærn (23 July 1915 – 6 November 2003) was a Swedish Army officer best known for having commanded Swedish, Irish, and Indian peacekeeping troops during the Congo Crisis. He also commanded Swedish forces in Cyprus in 1964. Wærn is one of only two Swedish officers (the other being Brigadier General Jan-Gunnar Isberg) who have served as brigade commanders in combat under the auspices of the United Nations. Later, he served as aide-de-camp to King Gustaf VI Adolf and as cabinet chamberlain.

Wærn embarked on a military career beginning in 1936, eventually becoming a captain in the Värmland Regiment by 1945. Throughout World War II, he served as a ranger platoon leader at the Norway–Sweden border. His military assignments ranged from deputy military attaché in Copenhagen to commanding battalions in the Congo during the early 1960s as part of the United Nations Operation. After his service in the Congo, he continued his career in various roles, including commander of the Swedish UN Battalion in Cyprus. Wærn's leadership style was noted for its emphasis on treating soldiers with care and respect. He chronicled his experiences in books such as Katanga and Cyprus, which contributed to his recognition as a significant military figure in Sweden.

== Early life ==
Wærn was born on 23 July 1915 in Spånga, Sweden, the son of lawyer Olof Wærn and the journalist Gerd Ribbing (née Rehn). He passed studentexamen in 1934.

== Career ==
=== Military career ===
Wærn became a reserve officer in 1936 and an officer in 1940. He was commissioned as an officer into the Värmland Regiment (I 2) in 1941. During World War II he served as a ranger platoon leader at the Norway–Sweden border. He was promoted to captain in Värmland Regiment in 1945, and attended the Royal Swedish Army Staff College in 1947. Wærn served as deputy military attaché in Copenhagen in 1948 and as second teacher at the Swedish Infantry Combat School the same year. Wærn attended the School of Infantry in Warminster, England in 1950 and served in the Värmland Regiment (I 2) in 1951. Wærn served in the Army Staff in 1955 and in the Västerbotten Regiment (I 20) in 1956 and was promoted to major the same year. He was the first teacher at Infantry Combat School in 1957, and the same year he was appointed ADC to King Gustaf VI Adolf.

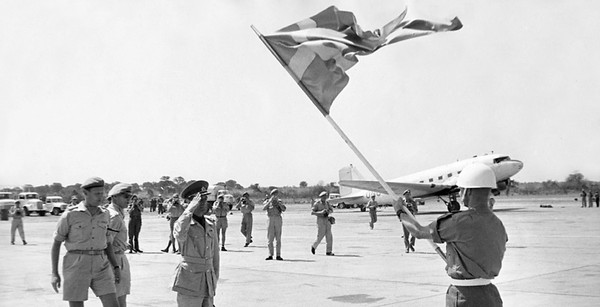
Wærn (far left) when Major General Curt Göransson salute the Swedish flag on his arrival in Élisabethville, Congo.

Wærn held an acting rank of colonel and served as commander of the XII K Battalion from June 1961 to December 1961 and of the XIV K Battalion from December 1961 to May 1962 in Congo. At the same time, he was brigade commander of the Swedish, Indian and Irish troops in southern Katanga, which was part of the United Nations Operation in the Congo (ONUC) from June 1961 to May 1962. On 12 May 1962, Wærn left the Congo and returned to Sweden. Back in Sweden, Wærn served as section chief of the staff of the IV Military District in 1962. He was promoted to lieutenant colonel in 1962 and was assigned to Northern Småland Regiment in Eksjö between 1962 and 1969. Wærn served as commander of the Swedish UN Battalion in Cyprus in 1964, part of the United Nations Peacekeeping Force in Cyprus (UNFICYP). He then served as infantry commander of the Stockholm Coastal Artillery Defence (Stockholms kustartilleriförsvar) in 1966.

Bo Pellnäs wrote the following about Wærn: "At its core, Wærn's leadership was characterized by words of wisdom uttered in China over four thousand years ago: 'Regard your soldiers as your children, and they will follow you into the deepest valleys; look on them as your own beloved sons, and they will stand by you even unto death'."

=== Later life ===
Wærn continued serving as aide-de-camp in His Majesty's Military Staff until 1973. In 1974 he was appointed cabinet chamberlain. Wærn continued to be active at the court as governor of Gripsholm Castle and Strömsholm Palace from 1975 to 1983. In 1976 he received a Bachelor of Arts degree.

Wærn was a member of the Samfundet SHT, the Charles John Association (Karl Johans förbundet), and the Bernadotte-Musei Vänner, a Swedish association of friends to the Bernadotte museum in Pau, France.

Wærn has recounted his experiences in the books Katanga (1980) and Cyprus (1995). In spring 1998, the TV program Röda rummet did a viewing poll about the century's most significant Swedish books. Wærn's book about Katanga was placed in 84th place out of 100 titles.

== Personal life ==
In 1939, Wærn married the royal housekeeper Lissie Ehnström (1916–2012), the daughter of Axel Ehnström and Stina Larsdotter. He was the father of Stina (born 1942), Olof (born 1944), Peder (1950–1998), and Lotta (born 1957).

== Death ==
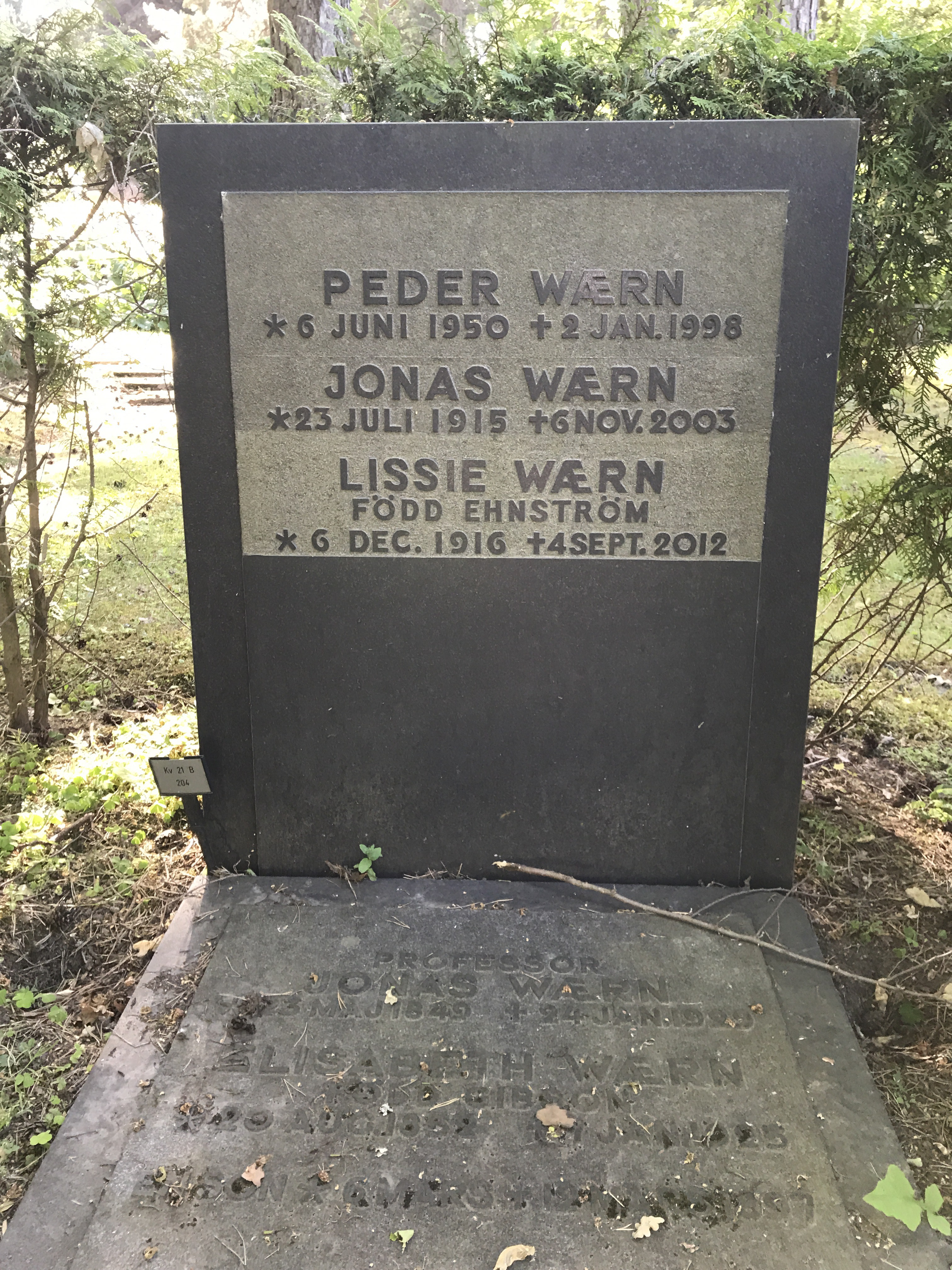
Grave at Norra begravningsplatsen

Wærn died on 6 November 2003. The funeral service took place on 21 November 2003 in the Royal Chapel in Stockholm. He was interred on 12 December 2003 in the family grave at Norra begravningsplatsen in Solna Municipality.

== Dates of rank ==
- ???? – Second lieutenant
- ???? – Lieutenant
- 1945 – Captain
- 1956 – Major
- 1962 – Lieutenant colonel
- 1961 – Colonel (acting rank)

== Awards and decorations ==
=== Swedish ===
- (Sweden) King Gustaf VI Adolf's Commemorative Medal (29 August 1967)
- (Sweden) Knight of the Order of the Sword (1958)
- (Sweden) Knight of the Order of Vasa (6 June 1969)
- (Sweden) Home Guard Medal of Merit in gold
- (Sweden) Värmland Officers Association's Silver Medal (Värmlands befälsförbunds silvermedalj)
- (Sweden) Army Shooting Medal (Arméns skyttemedalj)

=== Foreign ===
- (France) Officer of the Legion of Honour
- United Nations Medal (ONUC; Congo)
- United Nations Medal (UNFICYP; Cyprus)
- United Nations Emergency Force Medal
- (Italy) Italian Red Cross' Silver Medal

== Bibliography ==
- Wærn, Jonas (1980). Katanga: svensk FN-trupp i Kongo 1961-62 (in Swedish). Stockholm: Atlantis. ISBN 9174861573. SELIBR 7644335.
- Wærn, Jonas (1984). Jonas Waerns rapport till Försvarsstaben (in Swedish). Hyltebruk: Dokumentär. SELIBR 2203331.
- Wærn, Jonas (1995). Cypern: svenskarnas inledande FN-aktion 1964 (in Swedish). Stockholm: Atlantis. ISBN 9174862219. SELIBR 7644386.

Military offices
Preceded by Gösta Frykman	Battalion Commander in the Congo; June 1961 – May 1962	Succeeded by Sten-Eggert Nauclér
