= Lewis Hoffacker =

American diplomat (1923–2013)

Roscoe Lewis Hoffacker (February 11, 1923, in Glenville, Pennsylvania – August 18, 2013, in Austin, Texas) was an American Career Foreign Service Officer who was Chargé d'Affaires ad interim to Algeria (1967–1969) and served a concurrent appointment as Ambassador Extraordinary and Plenipotentiary to Cameroon and Equatorial Guinea (1970–1972).

== Biography ==
Born to parents Beulah Barbehenn and Roscoe E. Hoffacker, Hoffacker attended the public schools in Hanover, Pennsylvania, Gettysburg College, and George Washington University (BA in International Affairs, 1948) where he was elected to Phi Beta Kappa. He continued his education at the Fletcher School of Law and Diplomacy (Master's degree in International Affairs, 1949), American University in Beirut, Oxford University in England, and the National War College.

Hoffacker was a First Lieutenant (77th Infantry Division) during World War II, serving in the Pacific. He was awarded a Purple Heart because he was wounded on Okinawa. He began his career with the U.S. Foreign Service in 1950 as desk officer for Greece and served subsequently in Tehran, Istanbul, Paris, Elisabethville and Leopoldville in the Congo, Algiers, Yaoundé, Santa Isabel, Norfolk VA, and several tours in Washington DC, where he retired in 1975 as Special Assistant to the Secretary of State (Coordinator for Combating Terrorism). After his retirement, Hoffacker joined Shell Oil Company as Consultant on International Affairs before retiring and to Cape Cod in 1988. In September 1995, he moved to Austin, Texas.

== Cameroon and Equatorial Guinea ==
During his tenure, Hoffacker was based in Cameroon. Equatorial Guinea was a young country at the time and within months of its independence, Newsweek reported the “Macias government had brought the country to “the verge of ruin…The treasury was empty. The Cabinet was rent by violent quarrels…His Foreign Minister and UN Representative were beaten to death.””

Macias was described as “a maniac with a record of corruption, sadism, and psychiatric disorders… Proportionally his rule equaled that in Nazi-occupied Europe in terms of brutality.… Madness had gripped his mind at a conference on November 3, 1967, when he said, “I consider Hitler to be the savior of Africa””

Since Hoffacker was based in Cameroon, the post in Equatorial Guinea was manned by two Foreign Service personnel, Counselor Alfred J. Erdos and Administrative Assistant Donald Leahy. Early on, Erdos complained to Hoffacker that he would not be able to work with Leahy and requested someone replace him. Hoffacker was unable to do that. The pressure of working in Equatorial Guinea was no help and Erdos ended up murdering Leahy on August 30, 1971. Two George Washington University psychiatrists “testified that (Erdos) had suffered an episode of acute paranoid psychosis.”
