= Orders, decorations, and medals of Sweden =

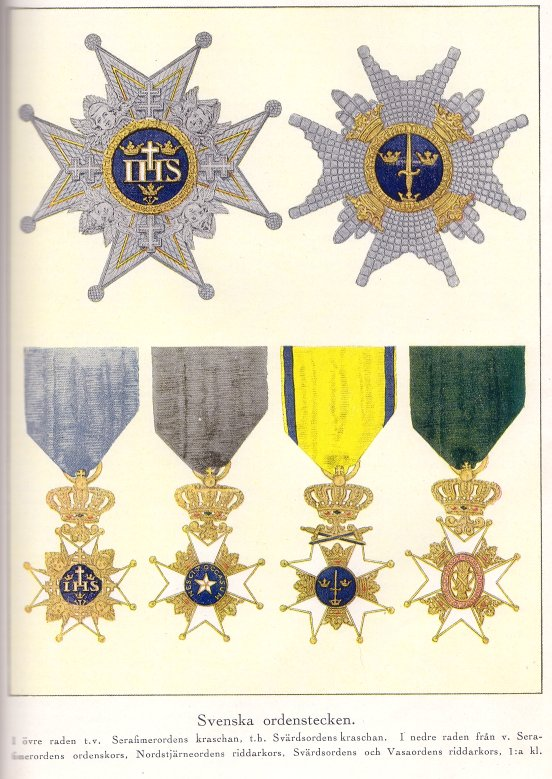
The Royal Orders of Sweden

The Orders, decorations, and medals of Sweden have a historical basis, reaching back to the 1561 founding of the extinct Order of the Savior. The Royal Order of Knights of Sweden were only truly codified in the 18th century, with their formal foundation in 1748 by Frederick I of Sweden. Significant reforms in 1974 changed the conditions and criteria under which many orders and decorations could be awarded.

In 2019, a parliamentary committee was instructed to establish guidelines on how to re-introduce the Swedish orders, including the Order of the Sword and the Order of Vasa, into the Swedish honours system, and how Swedish citizens again can be appointed to Swedish orders. The committee presented its findings in September 2021 and the Government declared that a bill on the subject would be presented to the Riksdag on 19 April 2022. The bill passed the Riksdag by a large majority on 19 June 2022.

On 20 December 2022, the Swedish Government published a new ordinance that repealed the 1974 regulation, and once again opened the Royal Orders to Swedish citizens and reactivated the Order of the Sword, Order of the Polar Star and Order of Vasa, which came into effect from 1 February 2023. 14 days later, new statutes of the Royal Orders of Knighthood was decided by an extra ordinary Chapter of the Royal Orders of Knighthood, as well as the members for the new Council of the Royal Orders of Knighthood.

The first awarding of the orders following this reform took place in March 2024.

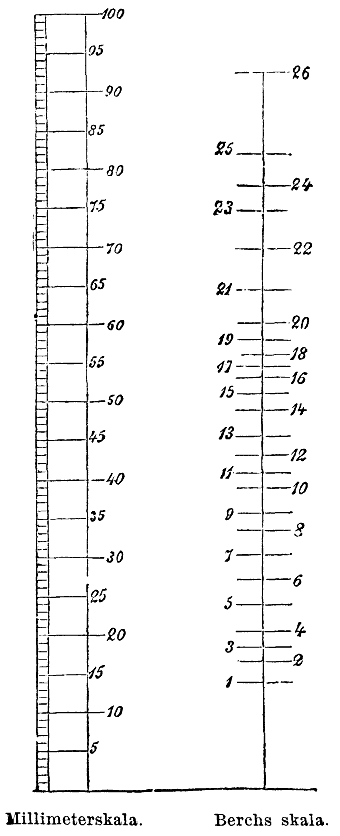
Chart comparing Swedish medal size scale to millimeters scale

== Orders ==
=== Royal orders of knighthood ===
- Royal Order of the Seraphim (Serafimerorden)
- Royal Order of the Sword (Svärdsorden)
- Royal Order of the Polar Star (Nordstjärneorden)
- Royal Order of Vasa (Vasaorden)
- Royal Order of Charles XIII (Carl XIII:s orden)

=== Orders of knighthood under royal patronage ===
- Order of St John in Sweden (Johanniterorden)

=== Fraternal orders under royal patronage ===
- Swedish Order of Freemasons (Svenska Frimurare Orden)
- Order of Coldin (Coldinuorden)
- Par Bricole (Par Bricole)
- Order of Svea (Svea Orden)
- Geatish Society (Götiska Förbundet)
- Order of Neptune (Neptuniorden)
- Order of Amarante (Stora Amaranterorden)
- Order of Innocence (Innocenceorden)

== Decorations and medals of the Royal Orders ==
- Seraphim Medal
- Medal of the Sword
- Royal Order of Vasa - Silvercross (Vasasign)
- Medal of the Royal Order of the Polar Star - 8th size
- Medal of the Royal Order of Vasa in Gold, 5th size
- Medal of the Royal Order of Vasa in Silver, 5th size

== Royal Medals presented by the King ==
- Royal Jubilee Commemorative Medals
- H. M. The King's Medal
- Litteris et Artibus
- Prince Eugen Medal
- Prince Carl Medal

== Royal Medals presented by the Government ==
- Illis Quorum
- Medal for Commendable Deeds
- Medal for Civic Virtue
- Medal for Diligent Reindeer Husbandry

== War decorations ==
- Royal Order of the Sword - Grand Cross - Knight 1st Class (dormant - last awarded 1942)
- Royal Order of the Sword - Grand Cross - Knight
- For Valour in the Field, Gold (awarded only in time of war)
- For Valour at Sea, Gold (awarded only in time of war)
- Royal Order of the Sword Military Cross in gold (never awarded)
- Swedish Armed Forces Medal of Merit in gold with sword (2008–2023)
- Swedish Armed Forces Medal for Wounded in Battle, gold (only awarded posthumously)
- For Valour in the Field, Silver (awarded only in time of war)
- For Valour at Sea, silver (awarded only in time of war)
- Royal Order of the Sword Military Cross in silver (never awarded)
- Swedish Armed Forces Medal of Merit in silver with sword (2008–2023)
- Swedish Armed Forces Medal for Wounded in Battle, silver
- Royal Order of the Sword Military Cross in bronze (never awarded)

== Military medals ==
Military medals:

- Swedish Armed Forces Medal for Wounded in Battle (2011–)
  - gold (only posthumously awarded)
  - silver with star (repeated awards)
  - silver
- Swedish Armed Forces Medal of Merit (1995–2009)
  - gold with swords
  - silver with swords
  - gold
  - silver
- Swedish Armed Forces International Service Medal of Reward with Swords (1995–2007)
  - gold
  - silver
- Swedish Armed Forces Medal of Merit (2008–2023)
  - gold
  - silver
- Swedish Armed Forces Conscript Medal (2002–2010)
- Swedish Armed Forces Reserve Officer Medal (2003/2008–)
  - gold
  - silver
- Swedish Armed Forces Service Medal for National Defense (2015–)
  - gold with Three Crowns ribbon device
  - gold
  - silver
  - bronze
- Swedish Armed Forces International Service Medal (1991/1994/2012–)
  - bronze
  - with medal clasp (Name of the mission area)
  - with medal clasp and laurel wreath (Honorary Award)
  - with medal clasp and palm (Field hospital in Saudi Arabia)
  - with medal clasp and crossed spears (Somalia)
  - with medal clasp and Star (Liberia)
  - with medal clasp and a Dromedary (Early missions in Afghanistan)
  - with medal clasp and laurel wreath (Georgia OSSE, Former Yugoslavia)
