= Stig von Bayer =

Swedish Army officer and writer

- Born: Stig Erik Otto von Bayer; 6 July 1937 (age 89)
- Died: 23 April 2024 (aged 86)
- Military career
- Allegiance: Sweden
- Branch: Swedish Army
- Rank: Major
- Nickname: Mad Swede
- Units: I 10; ONUC (1960–64); UNFICYP (1964–68)
- Conflicts: Congo Crisis (1960–64); Cyprus dispute (1964–68)
- Awards: Vasa Medal; Swedish Armed Forces Medal for Wounded in Battle
- Other work: Work for the Red Cross

Stig Erik Otto von Bayer (6 July 1937 – 23 April 2024) was a former Swedish Army officer, war veteran, peacemaker and writer. He was the longest serving UN soldier during the Congo Crisis.

== Early life ==
Stig von Bayer came to Congo and the province Maniema in 1949 at age 12 with his parents who were aid workers who helped to build bridges and roads. He stayed there until 1954. There he learned both Swahili and French, languages that he would get much use of later in his life. In his teens, he worked as a hunter in the bush to get meat for the road and bridge builders, a work that was led by his father, the forest officer Hans M Hansson. Back in Sweden he did his military service at the Södermanland Regiment (I 10) in Strängnäs.

== Career ==
=== Congo ===
In 1960 as a cadet sergeant at Södermanland Regiment, he volunteered for service on 19 July 1960. For three days von Bayer served as an interpreter with the 8th Swedish Infantry Battalion, which had been airlifted to Léopoldville directly from the Gaza Strip, where it had been serving as a part of the United Nations Emergency Force (UNEF). After a while he got himself assigned as an interpreter in an advance party of the 32nd Irish Battalion, which was on its way to Goma, on the Congo's eastern border, where the Congolese troops were firing across the border at Belgian soldiers. He then went from Goma to Albertville, the North Katanga city that by then had been the scene of rebellion in recent weeks. On 8 November 1960, Luba militiamen massacred nine men of an Irish patrol at Niemba, just west of Albertville. The day before von Bayer was out there to talk to the patrol and the day after he had to collect their bodies.

In January 1961, von Bayer was transferred to the Swedish battalion in Élisabethville, the capital of President Tshombe's secessionist Katanga. He participated in both the September and December 1961, fighting against the mercenary‐led Katangese Gendarmerie. During one time, he and a Swedish platoon got trapped on a train at Luena after the gendarmerie had cut the rail line just behind them and in front of them. About one thousand Lunda tribesmen loyal to Tshombe attacked them each morning for three days until they were pushed back. In late 1962 he was detached from the Swedish battalion and assigned directly to United Nations headquarters as a liaison officer with the Congolese Army. In January 1963, after serving successfully in Léopoldville, Albertville and Luluabourg, von Bayer was assigned to the Kwilu Province, where the Congolese under the Beijing‐trained Pierre Mulele had begun a revolt. von Bayer commanded the UN operations that rescued missionaries (chiefly Americans) and ferried arms and supplies to isolated Congolese Army units.

On 3 February 1964 fighting occurred during the evacuation of the mission station in Kisandji. von Bayer and Swedish pilot Thorwald Glantz with their DHC Otter plane interfered and made repeated dive attacks on the militia which slowed their advance so that helicopters with the rescued missionaries could take off. Glantz and von Bayer were awarded the Vasa Medal of the 8th size on 23 April 1964 and a special commendation from President Lyndon B. Johnson. In May 1964, von Bayer got his last assignment from the UN: liaison with Congolese forces trying to put down a revolt in Kivu region in the east. von Bayer later became Chief of Intelligence and came to be the longest serving UN soldier the Congo, where he arrived in 1960 and left in 1964, having spent three years and 319 days. Meanwhile, in the Congo, he got to know the country's dictator Mobutu who offered him a position as a lieutenant colonel in the Congolese staff, which he rejected.

=== Later career ===
After Congo von Bayer returned to Sweden as captain at Södermanland Regiment, but the same year he travelled with UNFICYP to Cyprus, where he stayed for four years. During the latter period of his life, von Bayer completed countless missions for the Red Cross, the UN and the EU including in Vietnam, Ethiopia, Sudan, Croatia and Peru. von Bayer was from mid-July 1968 to the end of January 1969 the Red Cross representative in South Vietnam. He was stationed in Quảng Trị, Huế, Quảng Tín, Quảng Ngãi and Da Nang provinces.

He became lieutenant the reserve of the Swedish Armoured Troops in 1967 and captain in 1972.

== Personal life ==
von Bayer lived as retired in Östra Frölunda and was a board member of the association UN Veterans Congo (FN-Veteranerna Kongo). At the Swedish Veterans Day on 29 May 2012 von Bayer was awarded the Swedish Armed Forces Medal for Wounded in Battle for the injuries he sustained in the Congo on 10 December 1961 when his hand was torn by shrapnel when Colonel Jonas Wærn's KP-bil were subjected to ambushes and hit by a bazooka rocket. Despite the injury von Bayer succeeded to combat the enemy's position so that the next rocket missed the target.

== Awards and decorations ==
=== Swedish ===
- (Sweden) Vasa Medal, 8th size (23 April 1964)
- (Sweden) Swedish Armed Forces Medal for Wounded in Battle, 8th size in silver (29 May 2012)
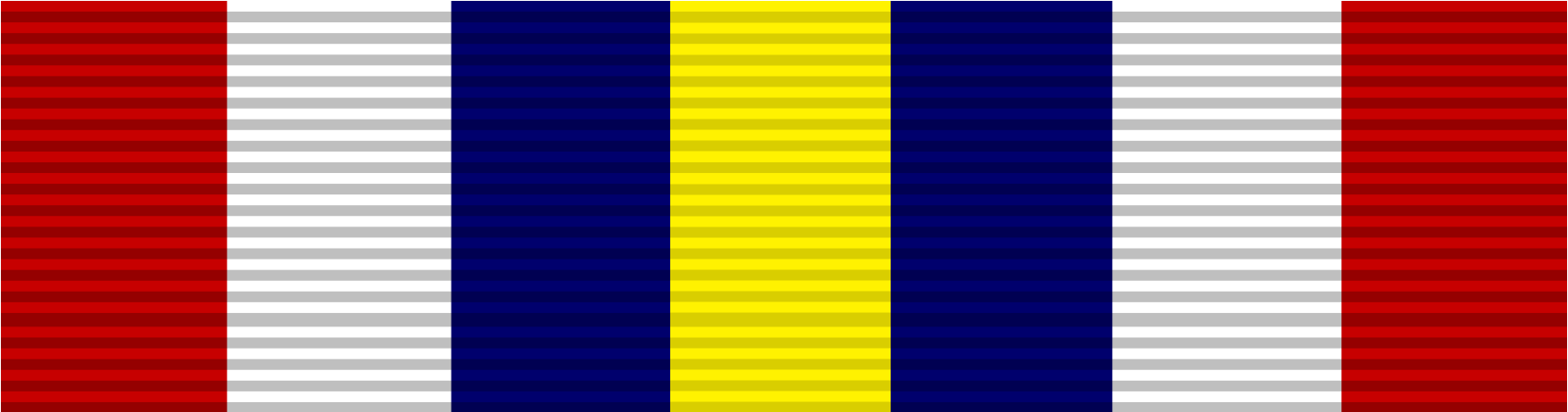
- (Sweden) The Nordic Blue Beret Medal of Merit (Blå barettförtjänstmedaljen, BbarettBM)
- (Sweden) Peacekeeper of the Year (2011)

=== Foreign ===
- United Nations Emergency Force Medal (UNEF)
- United Nations Medal (ONUC)
- United Nations Medal (UNFICYP)

== Bibliography ==
- Bayer, Stig von; Braunstein, Christian, eds. (2009). Mucka inte med Trolldoktorn: information om vikten av att anpassa sig (in Swedish). Norrköping: Fredsbaskerförlaget. ISBN 978-91-85609-06-2. SELIBR 11605530.
- Braunstein, Christian, ed. (2008). Bwana Kabamba: svensk FN-officer bland kannibaler och minor : Kongo 1949-1964 [Bwana Kabamba: Swedish UN officer among cannibals and mines: the Congo 1949-1964] (in Swedish). Norrköping: Fredsbasker Förlaget. ISBN 978-91-85609-03-1. SELIBR 10795820.
