= Bill Beagan =

Canadian ice hockey administrator and referee (born 1937)

- Born: December 1, 1937 (age 88); Parry Sound, Ontario, Canada
- Occupations: Ice hockey administrator and ice hockey referee
- Known for: CCHA, IHL, EHL & OMJHL commissioner
- Awards: Bobby Orr Hall of Fame
- Honours: Bill Beagan Trophy
- Military career
- Allegiance: Canada
- Branch: Army
- Service years: 1954 to 1967
- Awards: United Nations Emergency Force Medal; Canadian Forces' Decoration; Canadian Peacekeeping Service Medal

William Thomas Beagan CD (born December 1, 1937) is a Canadian retired ice hockey administrator and ice hockey referee. He served in the Canadian Army for thirteen years, before refereeing in the National Hockey League (NHL) for two seasons. He was commissioner of the International Hockey League (IHL) from 1969 to 1978, the Ontario Major Junior Hockey League (OMJHL) from 1978 to 1979, the Eastern Hockey League from 1979 to 1981, and the Central Collegiate Hockey Association (CCHA) from 1985 to 1998. He was a partial owner and the general manager of the Toledo Goaldiggers from 1981 to 1985, and led the team to two Turner Cup championships.

Beagan is credited for turning around IHL finances and making it a top-tier development system for future NHL talent. He had agreements with the NHL to develop on-ice officials while commissioner of the IHL and the CCHA. He signed the CCHA to the first national television contract for colleges in the United States, introduced instant replay to the league, and shared revenue with the schools. On-ice success was realized when CCHA teams won six NCAA Division I Men's Ice Hockey Tournament championships during his tenure. He has been honoured with the United Nations Emergency Force Medal, the Canadian Forces' Decoration and the Canadian Peacekeeping Service Medal. In 1998, the CCHA made him the namesake of the Bill Beagan Trophy for the most valuable player in the CCHA Men's Ice Hockey Tournament.

== Early life ==
William Thomas Beagan was born on December 1, 1937, in Parry Sound, Ontario, as the second youngest in a family of twelve children. He learned to skate on a frozen pond at age six, by wearing multiple pairs of socks in a second-hand pair of ice skates that were five sizes too big. He attended Parry Sound High School until tenth grade, then enrolled in the Soldier Apprentice program in the Canadian Army at age 16. He was deployed as part of the United Nations Emergency Force for the Suez Crisis in 1959. He later worked at the National Defence Headquarters in Ottawa, then was involved with the North American Aerospace Defense Command while stationed in the United States.

== Refereeing career ==
Beagan refereed for the Ottawa District Hockey Association while in Ottawa. After transferring to the United States, he officiated games at military bases in Madison, Wisconsin and Duluth, Minnesota, and then games in the International Hockey League (IHL) in 1965.

Beagan was promoted to refereeing in the National Hockey League (NHL) by Scotty Morrison in 1967. Beagan's contract for the 1967–68 NHL season stipulated a basic salary of US$6,000, $150 per NHL game, $90 per American Hockey League game, and $75 per Central Professional Hockey League game. He was one of the three match officials in the game on January 13, 1968, where Bill Masterton of the Minnesota North Stars sustained a head injury, and later died as a result of the on-ice accident.

== International Hockey League ==
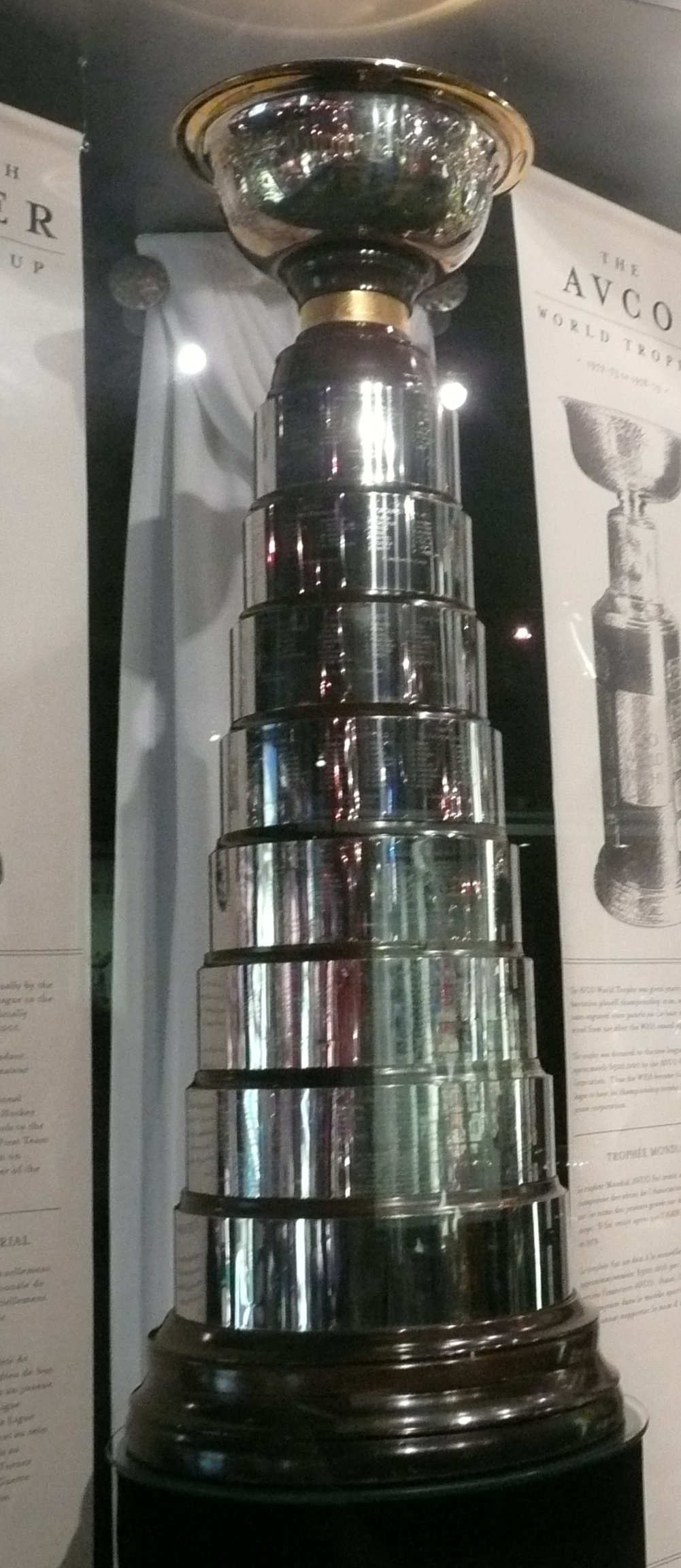
The Turner Cup was the championship trophy of the International Hockey League.

Beagan was recommended for commissioner of the IHL by NHL president Clarence Campbell, who mentored him as an on-ice official. He succeeded Andy Mulligan as IHL commissioner in August 1969. In his role as commissioner, Beagan served as a director with the Amateur Hockey Association of the United States (AHAUS) from 1971 to 1976, and attended the 1976 Winter Olympics as a supervisor of hockey officials.

Beagan testified at the July 1976 United States House of Representatives inquiry into professional sports, which investigated United States antitrust law, the effect of United States nationality law, finances of leagues and their franchises, and violence in sport. He stated that IHL players were not considered professionals despite receiving some compensation, and were classified as amateurs by AHAUS. He testified that the IHL was the largest financial contributor to AHAUS at the time, had an agreement with the NHL to develop on-ice officials and players, but the World Hockey Association (WHA) did not negotiate an agreement. Beagan felt that the NHL was no longer able to contribute much towards amateur programs in the United States or Canada due to competition from the WHA, which undermined the IHL. He stated the league faced challenges to maintain quality due to changes to immigration laws which deterred participation by players and referees who were Canadian.

After nine years as the IHL commissioner, Beagan was credited by the Canadian Press for turning around the league's financial situation and making it a top-tier development system for future NHL talent.

== Ontario Major Junior Hockey League ==
Beagan became the first full-time commissioner of the Ontario Major Junior Hockey League (OMJHL) on December 15, 1978, succeeding Tubby Schmalz. He took over a league whose teams were facing attendance and financial issues. He stated the targeting younger talent by the WHA was a threat to junior ice hockey, and sought to convince professional leagues that they are undermining their own future by signing players too young. In January 1979, Beagan felt the OMJHL would suffer from the Liquor Licence Board of Ontario ruling that breweries could no longer sponsor junior hockey, due to underage athletes on the teams. The OMJHL stood to lose $200,000 combined from Molson Brewery and the Labatt Brewing Company. Beagan petitioned the Government of Ontario to overturn the decision, stating the breweries had been good corporate citizens by supporting sports in Ontario.

Beagan's tenure with the OHL ended after 42 days, and he described his relationship in dealing with contract negotiations as "rocky". He stated, "They hired me to be captain. When I got there, I found out I was to be the second mate". The Canadian Press reported that Beagan claimed he was fired from the OMJHL, whereas the league stated he resigned after six weeks on the job. A settlement was subsequently reached out of court.

== Eastern Hockey League ==
Beagan was named commissioner of the Northeastern Hockey League on June 14, 1979. The league was rebranded as the Eastern Hockey League, which he oversaw for two seasons until 1981.

== Toledo Goaldiggers ==
In 1981, Beagan became a partial owner and the general manager of the Toledo Goaldiggers in the IHL. Under his management, the team won Turner Cup championships during the 1981–82 IHL season and the 1982–83 IHL season. He and business partner Virgil Gladieux submitted a bid to buy the NHL's Detroit Red Wings in 1982, but the team was sold to Mike Ilitch instead.

== Central Collegiate Hockey Association ==
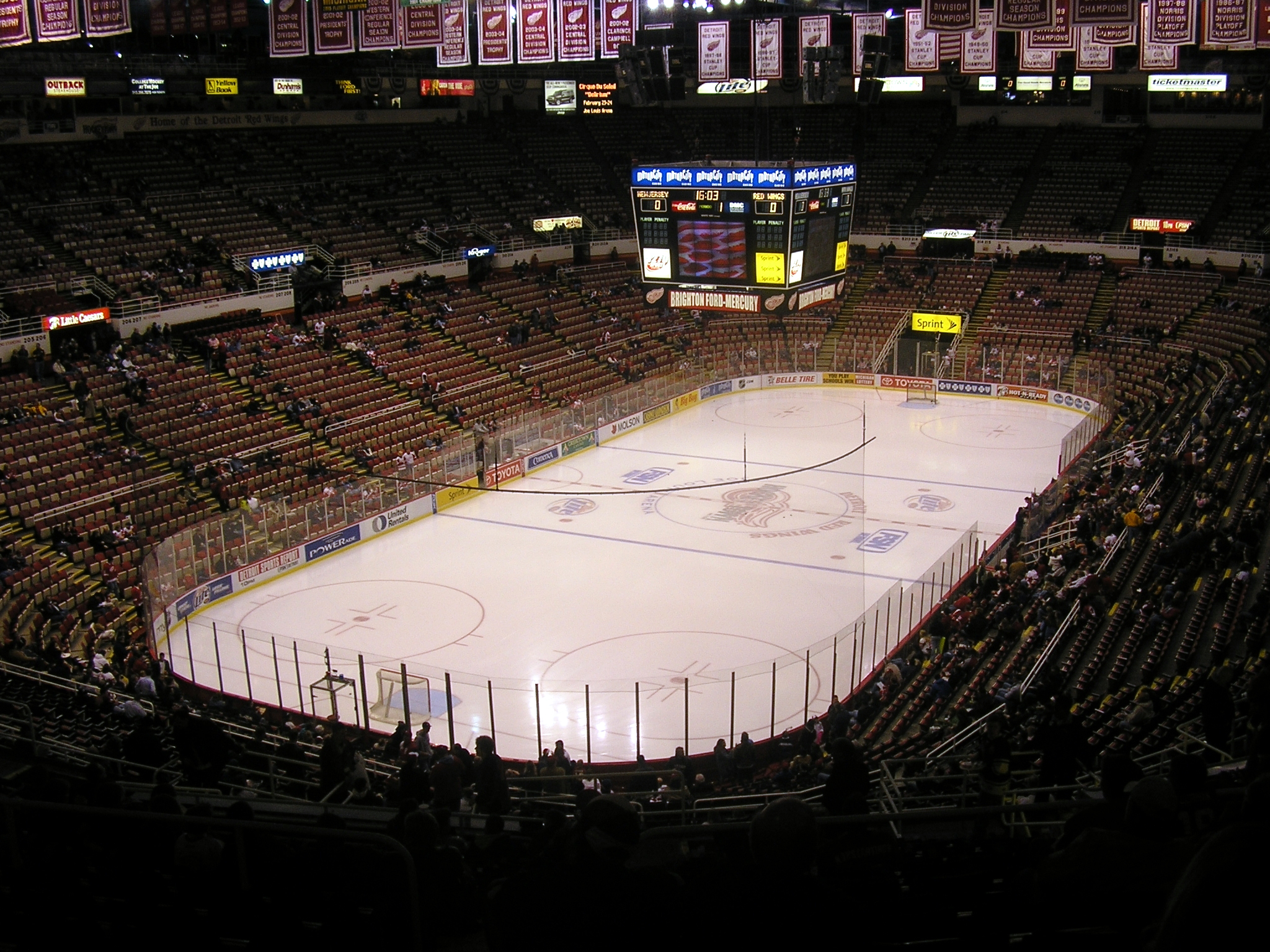
Joe Louis Arena hosted the CCHA Men's Ice Hockey Tournament finals.

The Central Collegiate Hockey Association (CCHA) hired Beagan as commissioner in 1985. NHL president John Ziegler Jr. suggested the position to him. Beagan initially oversaw the CCHA from home, then relocated to its headquarters at the University of Michigan during the second season. He implemented a pre-season training camp for referees, despite the officials going on strike in protest. He developed a working relationship with the NHL to develop future officials in collegiate hockey.

Beagan sought to have CCHA games televised as a game-of-the-week, and signed the first national television contract for colleges in the United States. He brought in cable television partners which included the Pro Am Sports System and Fox Sports Net. He introduced instant replay to the CCHA in 1993, to be used at its league championships, and arranged for the CCHA Men's Ice Hockey Tournament finals to be played at Joe Louis Arena. He was credited with coining the phrase, "Road to the Joe", in reference to end-of-year tournament culminating at the Joe Louis Arena.

Prior to Beagan's arrival, the CCHA had not been a profitable association. After 10 years as commissioner, the league had made $4 million. Profits were shared with the schools, which were reinvested into hockey programs and new arenas. On-ice results improved during his tenure, and CCHA teams won six NCAA Division I Men's Ice Hockey Tournament championships. In addition, Beagan convinced the University of Notre Dame to resurrect its hockey program in 1992.

Beagan resigned as CCHA commissioner in 1998. He described his experience as a part-time position that became a 13-year temporary job as a labour of love, and felt that the CCHA had been receptive to changes which increased exposure and the success of college hockey.

== Later life ==
After retirement, Beagan became involved in fundraising for military veterans charities. His hobbies include golf, cycling and winemaking. He and his wife Barb spend the winter in Hilton Head Island, South Carolina and the summer in the Parry Sound area. He was the subject of the 2011 book, Shooting for the Moon: The Bill Beagan Story. He donated his personal collection of documents and hockey memorabilia to the Hockey Hall Of Fame Resource Centre and Archives later in 2011.

== Awards and honours ==
Beagan received the United Nations Emergency Force Medal in 1959, the Canadian Forces' Decoration in 1967, the Distinguished Service Award from AHAUS in 1974, the International Hockey League executive of the year award from The Hockey News in 1976, the Dedicated Service Award from AHAUS in 1979, the minor league executive of the year award from The Hockey News in 1982, the Canadian Peacekeeping Service Medal in 2001, and was inducted into the Bobby Orr Hall of Fame in Parry Sound in 2004.

In 1998, the most valuable player award for the CCHA Men's Ice Hockey Tournament was renamed the Bill Beagan Trophy.

== Bibliography ==
- Inquiry Into Professional Sports: Hearings Before the House Select Committee on Professional Sports, Washington, D.C.: United States Government Printing Office, 1976 – via Google Books
- Bacon, John U. (2001). Blue Ice: The Story of Michigan Hockey. Ann Arbor, Michigan: University of Michigan Press. ISBN 0-472-09781-4 – via Google Books.
