= Torsten Stålnacke =

Swedish Army soldier (1933–2012)

- Born: Torsten Emanuel Stålnacke; 31 December 1933; Svappavaara, Sweden
- Died: 4 August 2012 (aged 78); Sälen, Sweden
- Military career
- Allegiance: Sweden
- Branch: Swedish Army
- Rank: Överfurir
- Nickname: "Stålis"
- Conflicts: UNEF (1956–57); ONUC (1961); UNFICYP (1965–1968)
- Awards: Vasa Medal; Swedish Armed Forces Medal for Wounded in Battle

Torsten Emanuel Stålnacke (31 December 1933 – 4 August 2012) was a Swedish United Nations soldier and Swedish Army överfurir, mostly known for his actions during the Congo Crisis in 1961.

== Early life ==
Stålnacke was born in Svappavaara, Sweden and did his military service at the Norrbotten Regiment (I 19) in Boden.

== UN service ==
He served with the rank of furir in the first two Swedish UN battalions in Suez-Gaza from 1956 to 1957 as part of UNEF. In the Congo, he belonged to Battalion XIIK in 1961.

Stålnacke became known during the Congo Crisis for his gallant conduct in action on 14 September 1961. While repelling a Gendarmerie armoured car attack on the refugee camp and a nearby UN depot, two of his comrades were incapacitated by shock and Stålnacke advanced by himself against an enemy firing position, armed with a Carl Gustav recoilless rifle. He disabled an enemy armoured car and a number of enemies. Stålnacke was then shot in the jaw. The bullet shattered his jaw, causing his chin to hang down. To stop himself from suffocating, he cleared bone fragments from his throat with his fingers and pulled his tongue up. While retreating under fire, Stålnacke held his chin up with one hand and held the recoilless rifle with the other. Using hand gestures and physical nudges to direct them, he managed to guide his two incapacitated comrades off the battlefield. Because of fighting around the Italian Red Cross hospital in the centre of Élisabethville, the ambulance could not drive all the way to it. For the last hundred meters, Stålnacke and his comrades had to run to the hospital using house walls for cover.

The Italian chief medical director, Giuseppe Cipolat, initiated the treatment of Stålnacke in Élisabethville and said to Colonel Jonas Wærn, "I served as a field medic in World War II, including the desert battles of Tobruk, and have taken care of wounded soldiers from many countries but I have never met a soldier who showed such courage and willpower as Torsten Stålnacke did." Stålnacke was awarded the Vasa Medal on 10 May 1962 for gallantry.

By the spring of 1963, Stålnacke had undergone 18 surgical operations. Although he never fully recovered, he served in the United Nations Peacekeeping Force in Cyprus from 1965 to 1968.

In total, he underwent 33 operations for his injuries at the Karolinska Hospital in Stockholm.

== Later life ==
After Stålnacke's time in the military, he ran a tavern in Helsingborg until 1972, when he bought the pension Pelikanen in Sälen, which he ran until his retirement in 2003. On 29 May 2012, Swedish Veterans Day, he was awarded the Swedish Armed Forces Medal for Wounded in Battle for the injuries he sustained in combat in the Congo on 14 September 1961.

== Personal life ==
Stålnacke lived with his partner Marianne and had a daughter, Susanne. His interests included berry picking, fishing and hunting.

== Death ==
Stålnacke died at his home on 4 August 2012 and was buried on 24 August in the Svappavaara cemetery.

== Awards and decorations ==
- (Sweden) Vasa Medal (10 May 1962)
- (Sweden) Swedish Armed Forces Medal for Wounded in Battle, 8th size in silver (29 May 2012)
- United Nations Emergency Force Medal (UNEF)
- United Nations Medal (ONUC)
- United Nations Medal (UNFICYP)
