= Swedish Armed Forces Medal for Wounded in Battle =

- Type: Military medal (Decoration)
- Awarded for: Swedish Armed Forces personnel wounded directly or indirectly as a result of combat during national or international mission
- Description: Medal in gold and silver, on the obverse a broken sword surrounded by a laurel wreath and the Swedish Three Crowns, on the reverse the motto. It's worn with a red-black ribbon where red symbolizes blood and black mourning.
- Country: Sweden
- Presented by: Sweden
- Eligibility: Military personnel
- Motto: "With life at stake" and "For Sweden"
- Status: Currently awarded
- Established: 25 March 2011
- Final award: 29 May 2018 (Veterans Day)

Highlights
- Total: 75 (29 May 2018)
- Ribbons

Swedish Armed Forces Medal for Wounded in Battle (Swedish: Försvarsmaktens medalj för sårade i strid, FMGMsis) is a Swedish is a reward medal instituted by the Swedish Armed Forces and is awarded to Swedish Armed Forces personnel wounded directly or indirectly as a result of battle during international mission.

== History ==
The medal was instituted by the government decision 20 FÖ2010/1074/MFI on 25 March 2011 and was developed by the Swedish Armed Forces in collaboration with the Kungl. Maj:ts orden and the National Swedish Museums of Military History with its Board of Military Traditions (Försvarets traditionsnämnd).

== Appearance ==
The medal is available in gold and silver and is worn in with ribbon where the red symbolizes the blood and the black mourning. The silver medal is awarded to Swedish Armed Forces personnel wounded in action. The gold medal can be posthumously awarded to those who had been killed in action. On the medal is a laurel wreath and the text "With life at stake" (Med livet som insats) and "For Sweden" (För Sverige) and the name of the person who receives it.

== Presenting ==
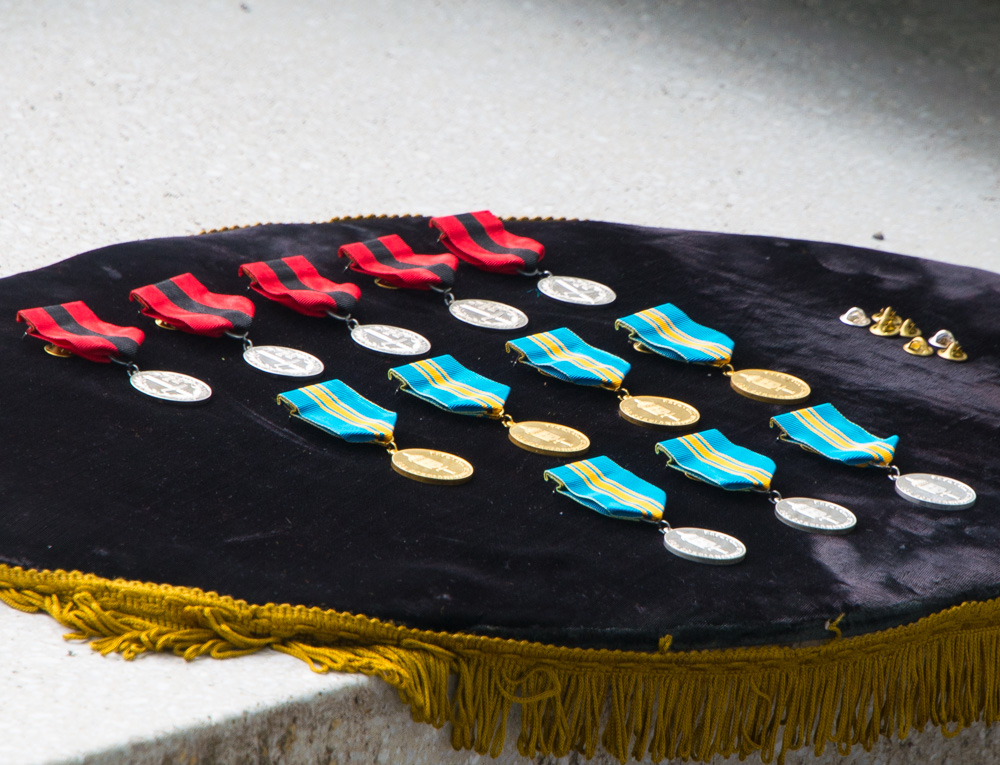
The Swedish Armed Forces Medal for Wounded in Battle (top in red and black) together with the Swedish Armed Forces Medal of Merit in gold and silver without swords.

The medal may be awarded to a person outside of the Swedish Armed Forces organization. For someone to be awarded the medal, the person in question needs to belong to the Swedish Armed Forces (eg, having a position in the unit that is conducting the operation) or be under the command of someone belonging to the Swedish Armed Forces. With the latter, for example, means a person who represents an authority or a civil organization and that at the time of the injury participated, collaborated with, supported or was protected by the Swedish Armed Forces' operations.

== Recipients ==
=== In silver ===
==== Veterans Day 29 May 2011 ====
- Robin Hedlund, wounded in action whilst serving in Afghanistan (FS 17)
- David Ström, wounded in action whilst serving in Afghanistan (FS 17)
- Mikael Thorén, wounded in action whilst serving in Afghanistan (FS 17)

==== Veterans Day 29 May 2012 ====
- Furir Göte Enquist because of the action in Gaza on 4 January 1957
- Överfurir Torsten Stålnacke because of the action in the Congo on 14 September 1961
- Fanjunkare Björn Bäck because of the action in the Congo on 21 September 1961
- Furir Per Martinsson because of the action in the Congo on 5 October 1961
- Corporal Roland Knutsson because of the action in the Congo on 17 December 1961
- Ulf Isaksson because of the action in the Congo on 18 December 1961
- Major Stig von Bayer because of the action in the Congo on 10 December 1961
- Sergeant Matz Lindberg because of the action in Lebanon on 29 March 1978
- Furir Magnus Rockler because of the action in Lebanon on 23 December 1986
- Private Björn Eggeblad because of the action in Lebanon on 13 September 1991
- Private Tommy Andersson because of the action in Lebanon on 13 September 1991
- Sergeant First Class Christoffer Lundström because of the action in Lebanon on 27 January 1994
- Private Stefan Sundelin because of the action in Afghanistan on 17 September 2010
- Private Lennie Johansson because of the action in Afghanistan on 18 October 2010
- Patrick Svensson because of the action in Afghanistan on 18 October 2010
- Furir Kongo Magnéli because of the action in Afghanistan on 20 October 2010
- Major Bengt Flodin because of the action in Afghanistan on 19 November 2010
- Milad Samadi because of the action in Afghanistan on 13 June 2011

==== Sweden's National Day 6 June 2012 ====
- Major Christer Carmnes, Luleå, because of the action in Lebanon on 26 June 1986
- Private Lennart Hultkrantz, Falköping, because of actions in Lebanon
- Magnus Heed, Stockholm, because of the action in Bosnia on 3 November 1993
- Furir Peter Enström, Visby, because of the action in Bosnia on 3 November 1993
- Private Bo Nilsson, Havdhem, because of actions in Bosnia in 1993/1994
- Benny Anderbro, Stockholm, because of actions in Bosnia in 1993/1994
- Carl Ronander, Täby, because of the action in Bosnia on 26 January 1994
- Peter Nilsson, Malmö, because of the action in Bosnia on 22 February 1994
- Thomas Ståhlhammar, Veberöd, because of the action in Bosnia on 22 February 1994
- Björn Persson, Bjärnum, because of the action in Bosnia on 22 February 1994
- Göran Byström, Borlänge, because of the action in Bosnia on 22 February 1994
- Private Stig-Inge Blennow, Lomma, because of the action in Bosnia on 22 February 1994
- Fänrik Kristoffer Melinder, Saltsjö-Duvnäs, because of the action in Bosnia on 28 April 1994
- Private Mathias Hackzell, Stockholm, because of the action in Bosnia on 14 January 1996
- Sergeant Karl-Magnus Karlsson, Växjö, because of the action in Bosnia on 14 January 1996
- Private John Lantz, Visby, because of the action in Bosnia on 14 January 1996
- Furir Martin Steen Enders, Vallentuna, because of the action in Bosnia on 14 January 1996
- Private Anders Gahnström, Boden, because of the action in Bosnia on 14 January 1996
- Furir Björn Wadelius, Tierp, because of actions in Bosnia in 1995
- Christopher Hagwall, Åsa, because of actions in Bosnia in 1995
- Lars Lindén, Norrköping, because of actions in former Yugoslavia in 1995
- Sergeant Anders Halldén, Eskilstuna, because of actions in Bosnia in 1996
- Private Peter Kero, Tärendö, because of the action in Afghanistan on 11 November 2009
- Ahmad Saadoun, Uppsala, because of the action in Afghanistan on 6 July 2011
- Emil Sehlberg, Luleå, because of the action in Afghanistan on 13 August 2011

==== Veterans Day 29 May 2013 ====
- Bo Lennart Andersson, Kista, because of the action in the Congo on 17 December 1960.
- Sonny Ek, Älvsjö, because of the action in the Congo on 13 September 1961
- Hans Mååg, Falun, because of the action in the Congo on 9 December 1961
- Arne Ehn, Blomstermåla, because of the action in the Congo on 10 December 1961
- Erik Härtel, Jönköping, because of the action in the Congo on 16 December 1961.
- Leif Ove Larsson, Slöinge, because of the action in the Congo on 16 December 1961
- Bengt Jansson, Sollentuna, because of the action in Lebanon during 1981
- Dennis Gouranius, Norrköping, because of the action in Lebanon on 9 January 2005
- Peter Hallgren, Skärplinge, because of the action in Bosnia during 1994
- Michael Calmhede, Stockholm, because of the action in Bosnia in May 1995
- Niklas Tornesjö, Norrköping, because of the action in Afghanistan on 16 June 2007
- Martin Toftevall, Eslöv, because of the action in Afghanistan on 3 August 2008
- Heikki Harinen, Kyrkslätt, Finland, because of the action in Afghanistan on 19 November 2010
- Efosa Erharuyi, Esbo, Finland, because of the action in Afghanistan on 19 November 2010
- Roger Ivholm, Vassmolösa, because of the action in Afghanistan on 23 March 2012

==== Veterans Day 29 May 2014 ====
- Ove Eriksson, wounded in the Congo on 16 December 1961
- Joakim Bohm, wounded in Bosnia in 1993

==== Veterans Day 29 May 2015 ====
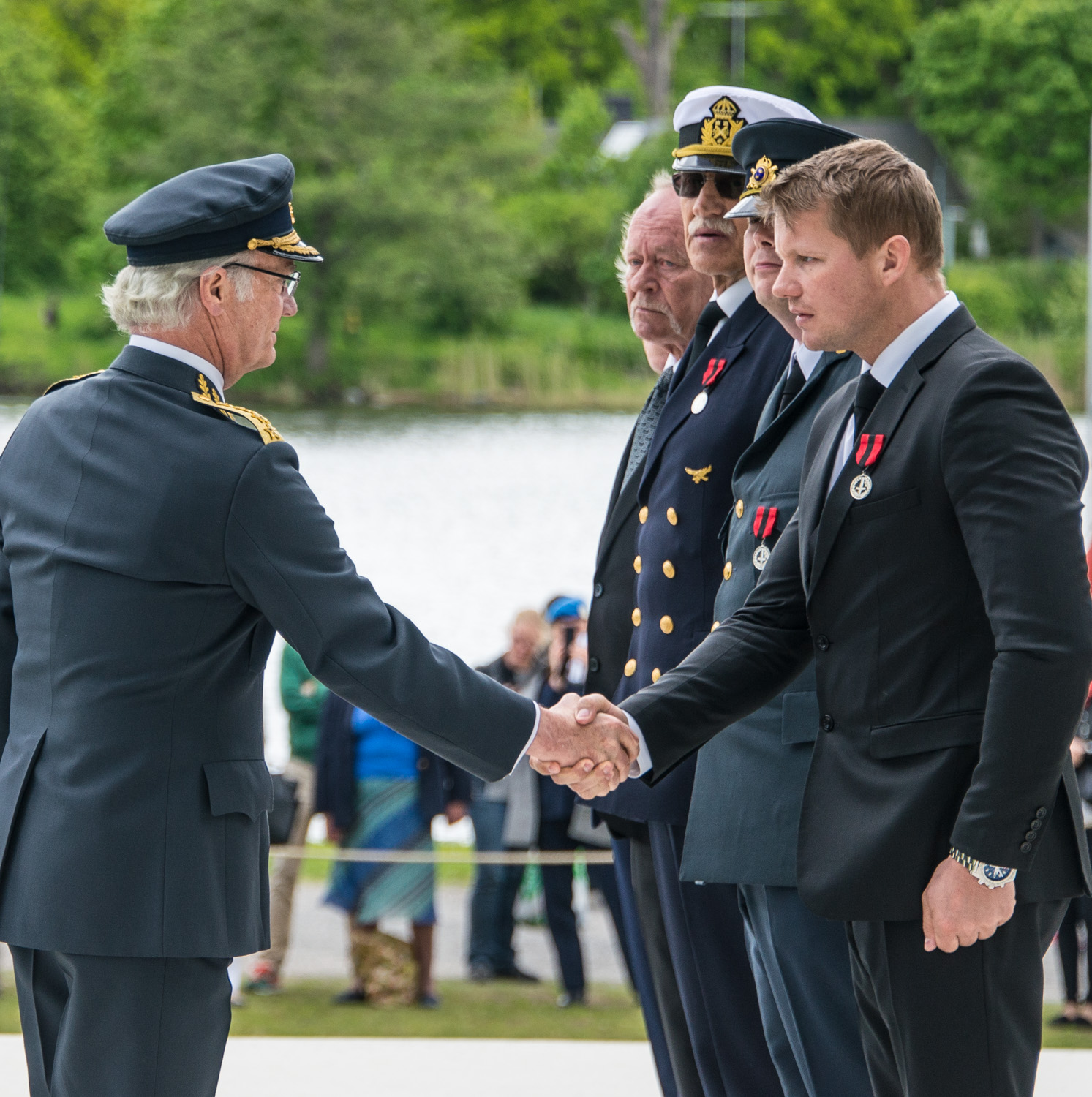
King Carl XVI Gustaf awarding of the medal at the 2015 Veterans Day.

- Sven Monander, Karlstad, wounded in action in the Congo in 1961
- Eiron Johansson, Jönköping, wounded in action in Suez in 1973
- Gunnar Hällgren, Lidingö, wounded in action in Bosnia in 1994
- Ulf Kassfeldt, Sundborn, wounded in action in Bosnia in 1996
- Morgan Andersson, Göteborg, wounded in action in Afghanistan in 2011

==== Veterans Day 29 May 2016 ====
- Olof Wärnick, Gunnarn, wounded in action in Gaza in 1967
- Lenn Moberg, Torslanda, wounded in action in Macedonia in 1993
- Per Sjöberg, Kulltorp, wounded in action in Kosovo in 2004
- Andreas Stenberg, Kristianstad, wounded in action in Afghanistan in 2011

==== Veterans Day 29 May 2017 ====
- Alexander Sjödin, Vilhelmina, wounded in action in Afghanistan in 2010
- Inge Haraldsson, Dals Långed, wounded in action in Cyprus in 1967

==== Veterans Day 29 May 2018 ====
- Vice corporal Jonas Schmidt, Malmö, wounded in action in Mali in 2017

=== In gold ===
- None
