= 2024 Swedish Royal Honours =

2024 conferment of Swedish Royal Orders

The 2024 Swedish Royal Honours (Swedish: Ordensförläningen 2024) were a set of appointments made to the Royal Orders of Sweden, the nations foremost decorations, by King Carl XVI Gustaf in March 2024. The appointments came as a result of the Reward Reform, a political initiative to restore the awardment of chivalric orders which since the Order Reform of 1974 had ceased. After 1974 only foreign Heads of State and members of the Swedish royal family had been eligible for the royal orders.

The reformed appointment process allowed nominations for the awards to be made by the general public. These nominations were then considered by the newly formed Council of the Orders before being forwarded to the Government of Sweden. The Government then made their recommendations and on 21 March 2024, King Carl XVI Gustaf made the formal decision on the appointments. The investiture ceremony was held on 31 May 2024 at the Royal Palace.

== Recipients ==
In total, thirteen people were appointed. They are listed below:

=== Royal Order of the Sword ===
Grade	Recipient	Title	Motivation
Commander Grand Cross	Dennis Gyllensporre	Lieutenant General	For exceptional leadership under warlike conditions in Mali
Commander First Class	Ulf Henricsson	Senior Colonel	For very exemplary leadership under warlike conditions in former Yugoslavia

=== Royal Order of the Polar Star ===
Grade	Recipient	Title	Motivation
Commander Grand Cross	Svante Pääbo	Professor	For exceptional contributions to science
Commander Grand Cross	Anne L’Huillier	Professor	For exceptional contributions to science
Knight	Catarina Wingren	Third Embassy Secretary	For decisive engagement in connection with Swedish international peace efforts in Mali

=== Royal Order of Vasa ===
Grade	Recipient	Title	Motivation
Commander Grand Cross	Antonia Ax:son Johnson	Director	For extraordinary contributions to enterprise and other sectors of society
Commander First Class	Benny Andersson	Artist	For very eminent contributions to Swedish and international musical life
Commander First Class	Agnetha Fältskog	Artist	For very eminent contributions to Swedish and international musical life
Commander First Class	Anni-Frid Reuss	Artist	For very eminent contributions to Swedish and international musical life
Commander First Class	Björn Ulvaeus	Artist	For very eminent contributions to Swedish and international musical life
Commander	Eva Rydberg	Actor	For long and successful engagement in performance arts
Knight First Class	Bettan Byvald	Social worker	For many years of significant social work
Knight	Thomas Sjöström	Business Area Manager	For great personal courage during the Swedish evacuation of Kabul
