= Swedish Armed Forces Service Medal for National Defence =

- Type: Service medal
- Awarded for: Length of service
- Country: Sweden
- Presented by: Swedish Armed Forces
- Eligibility: Swedish soldiers, sailors, and non-commissioned officers
- Status: Currently awarded
- Established: 26 June 2015
- Ribbon bar

Precedence
- Next (higher): Swedish Armed Forces Reserve Officer Medal
- Next (lower): Swedish Armed Forces International Service Medal

The Swedish Armed Forces Service Medal for National defence (Swedish: Försvarsmaktens tjänstgöringsmedalj för rikets försvar, FMGSS) is a service medal awarded to soldiers, sailors, and non-commissioned officers of the Swedish Armed Forces. Established 26 June 2015 by Sverker Göranson Supreme Commander of the Swedish Armed Forces, this medal is part of efforts to retain military personnel. The Swedish Armed Forces Service Medal for National defence falls into Category I: Other official medals of the armed forces order of wear.

== Classes ==
The medal is awarded in four different classes depending on the length of service being recognized:

- Bronze (FMGSSBM) - 4 years of service
- Silver (FMGSSSM) - 6 years of service
- Gold (FMGSSGM) - 8 years of service
- Gold with Three Crowns clasp (FMGSSGMm3kr) - 12 years of service

== Appearance ==
The medal is made of bronze, it may also be finished in silvered or gilded bronze. It is 33 mm (1.3 in) in diameter or of the 8th size in the Swedish Berch's Scale for medals. The obverse shows the coat of arms of the Swedish Armed Forces surrounded by a laurel wreath open at the top. Above is the text För rikets försvar (For national defence). The reverse of the medal is plain.
