= Swedish Armed Forces Medal of Merit =

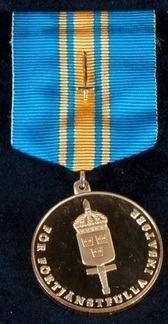
- In gold with sword.
- Type: Military medal (Decoration)
- Awarded for: Actions during combat or during war-like situations
- Country: Sweden
- Presented by: Sweden
- Eligibility: Swedish and foreign personnel
- Motto: "FOR MERITORIOUS SERVICES"
- Status: Currently awarded
- Established: 8 February 2008

Highlights
- Total awarded posthumously: 3
- Ribbon bars

Swedish Armed Forces Medal of Merit (Swedish: Försvarsmaktens förtjänstmedalj, FMGM and FMSM) is a Swedish reward medal established by the Swedish Armed Forces and is awarded for action during combat or during war-like situations. The decision to award the medal is taken by the Supreme Commander and can be awarded to both Swedish and foreign personnel.

== History ==
The medal was established in 2008, through a merger between the Swedish Armed Forces International Service Medal of Reward [in silver or gold with blue ribbon coated with a sword in silver] (Försvarsmaktens belöningsmedalj för internationella insatser [i silver eller guld med blått band belagt med svärd i silver]) and the Swedish Armed Forces Medal of Merit ("for commendable efforts") [in silver or gold with yellow ribbon (in some cases coated with a sword in each denomination)] (Försvarsmaktens förtjänstmedalj ("för berömliga insatser") [i silver eller guld med gult band (i vissa fall belagt med svärd i respektive valör]). These two medals are no longer awarded.

The medal can be awarded regardless of the circumstances prevailing at the time of the operation; national, international operations, actions during war-like circumstances or other personal effort or activity. The medal criteria are also applicable if Sweden is at war (armed conflict). The Medal of Merit will be awarded to anyone, whether he belongs to or operates in the Swedish Armed Forces or not and irrespective of his nationality.

== Appearance ==
The medal is divided into two classes, gold medal and silver medal. The medal is made from gilded hallmarked silver and hallmarked silver with 31 mm diameter. The obverse side shows the Swedish Armed Forces heraldic arms and around the outer edge the text "FOR MERITORIOUS SERVICES" (FÖR FÖRTJÄNSTFULLA INSATSER). The reverse shows around the outer edge a laurel wreath and is otherwise smooth and can be equipped with the holder's name, year of awarding and, if appropriate, country. The medal is also made in miniature. There is also a diploma that comes with the medal.

The medal is worn with a blue ribbon with a broad yellow stripe in the middle and one narrow on each side. On the ribbon there is an erect sword in gold or silver if the medal is awarded for actions in combat or during war-like situations. Instead of the medal, the service ribbon can be worn. It's provided with a horizontal sword of gold or silver if the medal awarded for actions in combat or during war-like situations.

== Presenting ==
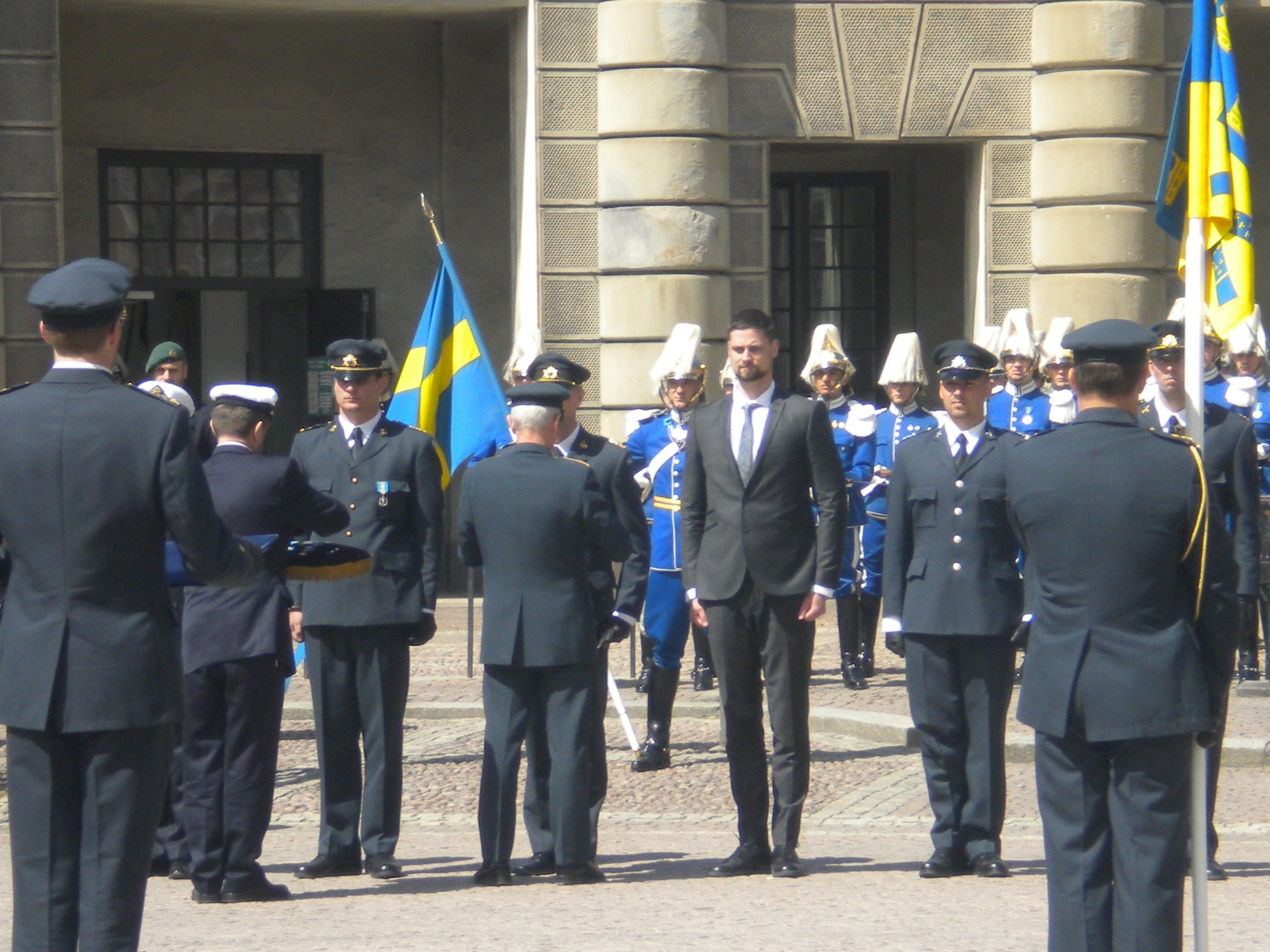
Supreme Commander General Sverker Göranson awards the Swedish Armed Forces Medal of Merit to Swedish UN soldiers at the 2012 National Day of Sweden.

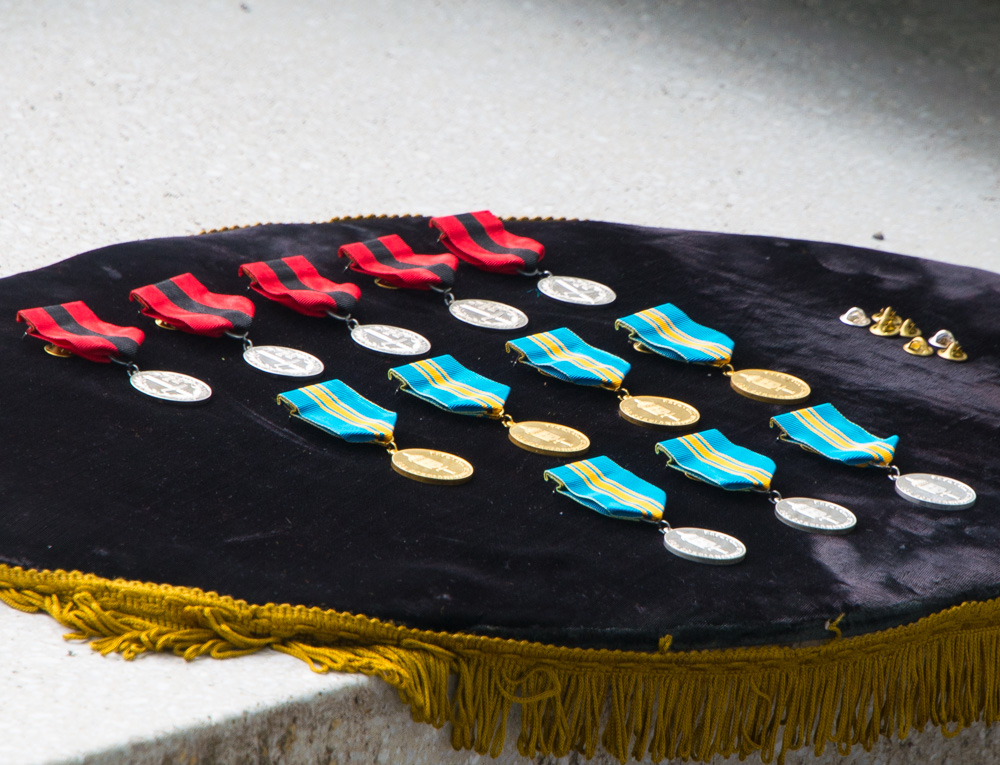
The Swedish Armed Forces Medal of Merit in gold and silver without swords together with the Swedish Armed Forces Medal for Wounded in Battle (top in black and red).

In each class, the medal can be awarded either for actions in battle or during war-like situations or for personal efforts in other circumstances. The medal may be awarded to Swedish and foreign citizens for meritorious services that benefited the Swedish Armed Forces and its operations. The decision to award the medal is taken by the Supreme Commander, usually following a proposal by the Supreme Commander's medal evaluation. The medal may be awarded posthumously and in that case, the medal is presented to the closest relative.

The medal shall normally be awarded by the Supreme Commander during ceremoniously events, e.g. on the National Day of Sweden or other appropriate ceremoniously events. The decision to award the medal to a member of the Swedish Armed Forces shall be introduced in the Swedish Armed Forces' personnel records. The Swedish Armed Forces Headquarters also has a register of all medals awarded, and any reasons for this.

== Criteria ==
The medal with certificate is awarded to individuals according to the following guidelines:

Medal with swords	Can be awarded for actions in combat or during war-like situations	Medal	Ribbon bar
Gold medal	Great personal courage by risking their own lives; Very meritorious leadership of units under difficult circumstances; Very meritorious effort under difficult circumstances; On killed during service		
Silver medal	Great personal courage; Meritorious efforts under difficult circumstances		
Medal without sword	Can be awarded for other situations	Medal	Ribbon bar
Gold medal	Great personal courage by risking their own lives; Very meritorious efforts that benefited the Swedish Armed Forces; Meritorious efforts that benefited the Swedish Armed Forces; On killed during service		
Silver medal	Great personal courage; Meritorious efforts that benefited the Swedish Armed Forces		

== Recipients ==
This with the † indicates that the Swedish Armed Forces Medal of Merit was awarded posthumously

Name	Home town	Rank	Place of action	Date of action	Date of awarding	Medal type	Notes
Johan Palmlöv †	Sundbyberg	Kapten	Mazar-i-Sharif, Afghanistan	7 February 2010	10 February 2010	Gold with sword	
Gunnar Andersson †	Stockholm	Löjtnant	Mazar-i-Sharif, Afghanistan	7 February 2010	10 February 2010	Gold with sword	
Kenneth Wallin †	Stockholm	Sergeant	Mazar-i-Sharif, Afghanistan	16 October 2010	19 October 2010	Gold with sword	
Dan Värdling	—	Fänrik	Afghanistan	10 October 2009	29 May 2012	Gold with sword	For great personal courage and risking his own life having made efforts under very difficult circumstances in connection with actions in Afghanistan.
Patrik Broman	—	Private	Afghanistan	8 September 2010	29 May 2012	Gold with sword	For having acted with great personal courage and risking his own life in connection with actions in Afghanistan.
Axel Salomonsson	—	Korpral	Afghanistan	8 September and 16 October 2010	29 May 2012	Gold with sword	For having acted with great personal courage and risking his own life and for meritorious service under difficult conditions in connection with actions in Afghanistan.
Jimmy Ericsson	—	Private	Afghanistan	16 October 2010	29 May 2012	Gold with sword	For having acted with great personal courage and risking his own life and for meritorious service under difficult conditions in connection with actions in Afghanistan.
Viktor Schwenk	—	1st Sergeant	Afghanistan	18 October 2010	29 May 2012	Gold with sword	For having acted with great personal courage and risking his own life and for meritorious service under difficult conditions in connection with actions in Afghanistan.
Anton Öhlund	—	Private	Afghanistan	18 October 2010	29 May 2012	Gold with sword	For having acted with great personal courage and risking his own life and for meritorious service under difficult conditions in connection with actions in Afghanistan.
Erik Landquist	—	Fänrik	Afghanistan	2010	29 May 2012	Gold with sword	For having acted with great personal courage and risking his own life as well as very meritorious service and pioneering skills under difficult conditions in connection with actions during his service in Afghanistan.
Stefan Linder	—	Kapten	Afghanistan	2010	29 May 2012	Gold with sword	For having acted with great personal courage and risking his own life, very meritorious leadership and meritorious service under difficult conditions in connection with actions during his service in Afghanistan.
Martin Rusner	—	1st Sergeant	Afghanistan	10 June 2010	29 May 2012	Silver with sword	For having acted with great personal courage and risking his own life, very meritorious leadership, pioneering skills and meritorious service under difficult conditions in connection with actions in Afghanistan.
Fredrik Lönn	—	Kapten	Afghanistan	25 July 2010	29 May 2012	Silver with sword	For having acted with great personal courage and risking his own life as well for pioneering skills and very meritorious service under difficult conditions in connection with actions during actions in Afghanistan.
Daniel Johansson	—	Kapten	Afghanistan	8 August 2010	29 May 2012	Silver with sword	For having acted with great personal courage and risking his own life as well as for very meritorious effort under difficult conditions in connection with actions in Afghanistan.
Peter Hellström	—	Vicekorpral	Afghanistan	22 August and 16 October 2010	29 May 2012	Silver with sword	For having acted with great personal courage and risking his own life in connection with actions in Afghanistan.
Anders Johnsson	—	Private	Afghanistan	16 September 2010	29 May 2012	Silver with sword	For having acted with great personal courage and risking his own life as well as for meritorious effort under difficult conditions in connection with actions in Afghanistan.
Linus Skaring	—	Private	Afghanistan	17 September 2010	29 May 2012	Silver with sword	For having acted with great personal courage and risking his own life as well as for meritorious effort under difficult conditions in connection with actions in Afghanistan.
Tobias Englund	—	Korpral	Afghanistan	8 October 2010	29 May 2012	Silver with sword	For having acted with great personal courage and risking his own life, very meritorious leadership and meritorious service under difficult conditions in connection with actions in Afghanistan.
Jonas Brobakken	—	Löjtnant	Afghanistan	2010	29 May 2012	Silver with sword	For very meritorious leadership, pioneering skills and meritorious service under difficult conditions in connection with actions during his service in Afghanistan.
Fredrik Dundeberg	—	Löjtnant	Afghanistan	2010	29 May 2012	Silver with sword	For having acted with great personal courage and risking his own life, very meritorious leadership, pioneering skills and meritorious service under difficult conditions in connection with actions during his service in Afghanistan.
Henrik Eriksson	—	Löjtnant	Afghanistan	2010	29 May 2012	Silver with sword	For having acted with great personal courage and risking his own life, very meritorious leadership, pioneering skills and meritorious service under difficult conditions in connection with actions during his service in Afghanistan.
Marcus Dyrvold	—	Kapten	Afghanistan	2010	29 May 2012	Silver without sword	For meritorious efforts and very meritorious leadership of the technical service under difficult conditions during his service in Afghanistan.
Kristian Sandahl	Veberöd	Kapten	Afghanistan	2011	29 May 2013	Gold with sword	For having acted with great personal courage and risking his own life, with very meritorious leadership, pioneering skills and meritorious efforts under difficult conditions in connection with the action in Afghanistan in the spring of 2011.
Johan Zelander	Malmö	1st Sergeant	Afghanistan	2011	29 May 2013	Gold with sword	For having acted with great personal courage and risking his own life, with very meritorious leadership, pioneering skills and meritorious efforts under difficult conditions in connection with the action in Afghanistan in the spring of 2011.
Mattias Otterström	Boden	Kapten	Afghanistan	3 September 2012	29 May 2013	Gold with sword	For having acted with great personal courage, and highly meritorious leadership, pioneering skills and meritorious efforts under difficult conditions in connection with the action in Afghanistan on 3 September 2012.
Jesper Söderström	Täby	Private first class	Afghanistan	22 January 2011	29 May 2013	Silver with sword	For having acted with great personal courage and risking his own life and for meritorious effort under difficult conditions in connection with the action in Afghanistan on 22 January 2011.
Callis Amid	Hässelby	Private first class	Afghanistan	22 January 2011	29 May 2013	Silver with sword	For having acted with great personal courage and risking his own life and for meritorious effort under difficult conditions in connection with the action in Afghanistan on 22 January 2011.
Johan Lindell	Malmö	Kapten	Afghanistan	2011	29 May 2013	Silver with sword	For having acted with great personal courage and risking his own life, for meritorious leadership and meritorious efforts under difficult conditions in connection with the action in Afghanistan in the spring of 2011.
Anders Johansson	Eksjö	1st Sergeant	Afghanistan	23 March 2012	29 May 2013	Silver with sword	For having acted with great personal courage and risking his own life and for meritorious efforts under difficult conditions in connection with the action in Afghanistan on 23 March 2012.
Erik Eklund	Höllviken	Sergeant	Afghanistan	23 March 2012	29 May 2013	Silver with sword	For having acted with great personal courage and risking his own life and for meritorious efforts under difficult conditions in connection with the action in Afghanistan on 23 March 2012.
Oskar Ekstrand	Halmstad	Korpral	Afghanistan	23 March 2012	29 May 2013	Silver with sword	For having acted with great personal courage and risking his own life and for meritorious efforts under difficult conditions in connection with the action in Afghanistan on 23 March 2012.
Marcus Klang	Uppsala	Korpral	Afghanistan	2012	29 May 2013	Silver with sword	For having acted with great personal courage and risking his own life and for meritorious efforts under difficult conditions in connection with the action in Afghanistan in 2012.
Dennis Medford	Västerås	Private	Afghanistan	3 September 2012	29 May 2013	Silver with sword	For having acted with great personal courage and risking his own life and for meritorious efforts under difficult conditions in connection with the action in Afghanistan on 3 September 2012.
Ramin Egbalsson	Stockholm	Korpral	Afghanistan	2011	29 May 2013	Silver without sword	For meritorious efforts under difficult conditions and a long-standing and exemplary mentoring before and during a number of operations in Afghanistan, including in 2011.
Gustaf Klefbom	Gothenburg	Löjtnant	Afghanistan	2011	29 May 2013	Silver without sword	For having acted with great personal courage and for very meritorious services during his service in Afghanistan in 2011.
Erik Henjered	Stockholm	Private first class	Afghanistan	2011	29 May 2013	Silver without sword	For a particularly meritorious and exemplary contribution as a cook under difficult conditions and meritorious efforts as a soldier during his service in Afghanistan in 2011.
Johan Andersen	Skövde	1st Sergeant	Uganda	30 July 2012	29 May 2013	Silver without sword	For having acted with great personal courage, and risking his own life, and for a very meritorious efforts under difficult conditions in Uganda on 30 July 2012.
Mikael Ljungwald	Stockholm	1st Sergeant	Uganda	30 July 2012	29 May 2013	Silver without sword	For having acted with great personal courage, and risking his own life, and for a very meritorious efforts under difficult conditions in Uganda on 30 July 2012.
Fredrik Lindskog	Åkarp	Löjtnant	Afghanistan/Sweden	2013	29 May 2014	Silver without sword	For exemplary efforts for several years in his service branch with the goal of creating a high combat value, sound resource management and positive attitude to the equipment service in the unit. Particularly proven during service in Afghanistan in 2013.
Lars Widegren	Lund	Löjtnant	Afghanistan/Sweden	2013	29 May 2014	Silver without sword	For exemplary efforts for several years in his service branch with the goal of creating a high combat value, sound resource management and positive attitude to the technical service within the unit. Particularly proven during service in Afghanistan in 2013.
Lars Lervik	Rena, Norway	Lieutenant colonel	Afghanistan	2013	29 May 2014	Silver without sword	For particularly good leadership, very high professionalism and unselfish work to support Sweden for successful results in a multinational context in Afghanistan in 2013.
Kent Jonsson	Linköping	Förvaltare	Sala, Sweden	2014	29 May 2015	Gold without sword	For having under extreme conditions, with excellent leadership and great skill and with great courage and risk of his own live, rescued five civilians from a probable death in connection with forest fire in Sala, Västmanland, Sweden in 2014.
Jöran Forsman	Nykil	Förvaltare	Sala, Sweden	2014	29 May 2015	Gold without sword	For having under extreme conditions, demonstrated a very high level of professionalism as well risking his own life, rescued five civilians from a probable death in connection with forest fire in Sala, Västmanland, Sweden in 2014.
Klas Johansson	Sturefors	Löjtnant	Sala, Sweden	2014	29 May 2015	Gold without sword	For having under extreme conditions, with great professionalism, improvisational ability, initiative and with great courage and risking his own life, rescued five civilians from a probable death in connection with forest fire in Sala, Västmanland, Sweden in 2014.
Ivar Sveninge	Linköping	Fanjunkare	Sala, Sweden	2014	29 May 2015	Gold without sword	For having under extreme conditions, with great professionalism, improvisational ability, initiative and with great courage and risking his own life, rescued five civilians from a probable death in connection with forest fire in Sala, Västmanland, Sweden in 2014.
Mikael Smedin	Strängnäs	Överstelöjtnant	Afghanistan	2013	29 May 2015	Silver without sword	For having, during his service in Afghanistan, demonstrated exemplary behavior, high levels of action, pioneering skills, integrity and responsibility under difficult conditions in a multinational context that benefited the relationship with the Afghan Army.
Folke Borgh	Strängnäs	Military lawyer (civilian)	Sweden	2014	29 May 2015	Silver without sword	With insightfulness, very good judgment and tact, as a military lawyer with environmental law as specialty, having for many years done meritorious efforts for the benefit of the Swedish Armed Forces.
Rose-Marie Johansson	Halmstad	Logistical manager (civilian)	Sweden	2014	29 May 2015	Silver without sword	For considerable initiative and personal commitment in the development and implementation of new working methods and strengthening the Swedish Armed Forces Logistics' (FMLOG) brand, both internally and externally, as well as meritorious efforts which benefited the Swedish Armed Forces.
Classified individual	—	—	Unknown	—	2016	Gold with sword	
Classified individual	—	—	Unknown	—	2016	Gold with sword	
Classified individual	—	—	Unknown	—	2016	Silver without sword	
Mats Svensson	Hörby	Fanjunkare	Karlskrona, Sweden	2016	29 May 2017	Gold without sword	For resourceful and skilled intervention with great presence of mind under pressured conditions and with great personal courage and danger for one's own lives, having prevented a major explosion which could have posed a major danger to personnel in the area and caused major material damage in connection with the accident at DNC, in Karlskrona.
Staffan Bartholdson	Borensberg	Kapten	Sveg, Sweden	2017	29 May 2017	Silver without sword	For resourceful intervention and with excellent professionalism, during chaotic conditions with great presence of mind and force of action, having landed a helicopter after an air collision, thereby saving both lives and material in connection with the accident in Sveg, Sweden.
Classified individual	—	—	Unknown	2010	2017	Silver with sword	For actions during 2010.
Per-Olof Nordin	Solna	Överstelöjtnant	Bamako, Mali	18 June 2017	29 May 2018	Silver with sword	For great personal courage under difficult conditions and ongoing battle performed meritorious services and assisted the civilians to reach safety during the terrorist attack on a hotel in Bamako, Mali.
Erik Holst Norgren	Lund	Sergeant	Timbuktu, Mali	3 May 2017	29 May 2018	Silver with sword	For great personal courage and meritorious service, quickly and resourceful carried out life-saving measures on a Liberian colleague and fought and limited a fire during an ongoing shooting against the international camp in Timbuktu, Mali.
Fredrik Andersson	Arvidsjaur	Major	Timbuktu, Mali	14 August 2017	29 May 2018	Silver with sword	For his meritorious leadership under difficult conditions during the period May–November 2017. Particularly highlighted is major Andersson's excellent leadership of the unit, exercised with great security, keeping his cool and high acuteness, despite limited intelligence and high threat from terrorist attack against the UN's sector headquarters in Timbuktu, Mali.
Anders Schääf	Myggenäs	Sergeant	Alån, Boden, Sweden	26 March 2017	29 May 2018	Gold without sword	For great personal courage and risking his own life having struggled in the icy water for thirty minutes in the common effort to try to save lives in the armoured recovery vehicle accident in Alån, Boden.
Jonathan Renman	Lycksele	Sergeant	Alån, Boden, Sweden	26 March 2017	2018	Gold without sword	For great personal courage and risking his own life having struggled in the icy water for thirty minutes in the common effort to try to save lives in the armoured recovery vehicle accident in Alån, Boden.
Nils Olsson	Boden	Löjtnant	Alån, Boden, Sweden	26 March 2017	29 May 2018	Silver without sword	For great personal courage and without hesitation having struggled in the icy water for thirty minutes in the common effort to try to save lives in the armoured recovery vehicle accident in Alån, Boden.
John Jutback	Gothenburg	Private	Alån, Boden, Sweden	26 March 2017	29 May 2018	Silver without sword	For great personal courage and without hesitation having struggled in the icy water for thirty minutes in the common effort to try to save lives in the armoured recovery vehicle accident in Alån, Boden.
Ulf Forsberg	Boden	Löjtnant	Alån, Boden, Sweden	26 March 2017	29 May 2018	Silver without sword	For great personal courage and without hesitation having struggled in the icy water for thirty minutes in the common effort to try to save lives in the armoured recovery vehicle accident in Alån, Boden.
Tom Wikström	Falun	—	Alån, Boden, Sweden	26 March 2017	29 May 2018	Silver without sword	For great presence of mind having taken a leading responsibility in coordinating the care of staff with hypothermia in the common effort to try to save lives in the armoured recovery vehicle accident in Alån, Boden.
Johan Solberg	Gothenburg	Vice korpral	Alån, Boden, Sweden	26 March 2017	Unknown	Gold without sword	Killed during service.
Olof Glans	Skärblacka	Kapten	Bihanga, Uganda	30 July 2012	29 May 2018	Silver without sword	For great personal courage and risking his own life and for the very meritorious effort under difficult circumstances in connection with the riot at the camp in Bihanga, Uganda.
Emil Bukowiecki	Malmö	Sergeant	Timbuktu, Mali	2 April 2017	29 May 2018	Silver without sword	For great personal courage and meritorious services quickly and resourceful helped save lives as well as material in connection with the fire in the Nigerian field hospital in the international camp in Timbuktu, Mali.
Gabriel Donati	Stockholm	Löjtnant	Mogadishu, Somalia	1 January 2016	29 May 2019	Silver with sword	For great personal courage and meritorious services, having rescued a vulnerable colleague during ongoing shelling against the International Campus in Mogadishu, Somalia
Robin Rönnholm	Storuman	Sergeant	Timbuktu, Mali	14 August 2017	29 May 2019	Silver with sword	For great personal courage at a high pace and with a high degree of presence of mind, carried out meritorious efforts during the terrorist attack against the UN's sector headquarters in Timbuktu, Mali.
Erik Röckner	Arvidsjaur	Vicekorpral	Timbuktu, Mali	14 August 2017	29 May 2019	Silver with sword	For great personal courage, retained coolness in a dangerous situation and with a high degree of presence of mind, made meritorious efforts during the terrorist attack against the UN's sector headquarters in Timbuktu, Mali.
