= Vasa Medal =

Civil award of Sweden

Vasa Medal (Swedish: Vasamedaljen, VGM/SM) Is a Swedish medal, awarded for general civil virtues.

It was established by King Oscar II of Sweden in 1895. It was given in gold and silver in 8th and 5th sizes. It ceased to be awarded in 1974.

Torsten Stålnacke and Stig von Bayer and nine other Swedish soldiers was awarded the Vasa Medal between 1962 and 1964 for their services during the Congo Crisis.

Stålnacke was nominated for För tapperhet i fält, but the general understanding was that this was not suitable for a medal whose statutes spoke of "fight against the enemies of the kingdom". When the "Swedish war decorations" (Svenska krigsdekorationer) were investigated in 1944 and 1951, the idea that Swedish soldiers would experience war situations without the kingdom formally being in a state of war was not widespread. The result was that the 11 soldiers who distinguished themselves by acts of valor received the Vasa Medal. Those who "only" were wounded got nothing. It was not considered with the times to publicly honor such sacrifices.

== Medal ==
The medal shows a royal crown without the king´s picture. It is worn on the green ribbon of the Order of Vasa. It carries the cross of the Order of Vasa. The reverse displays a globe coated with the Three Crowns of the coat of arms of Sweden.

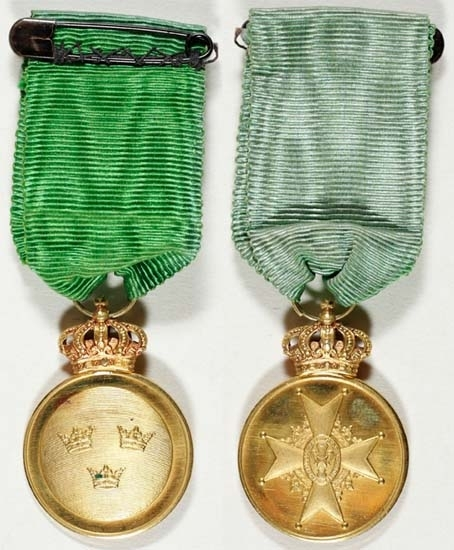
Vasa Medal, gold, 8th size. Engraver: Erik Lindberg

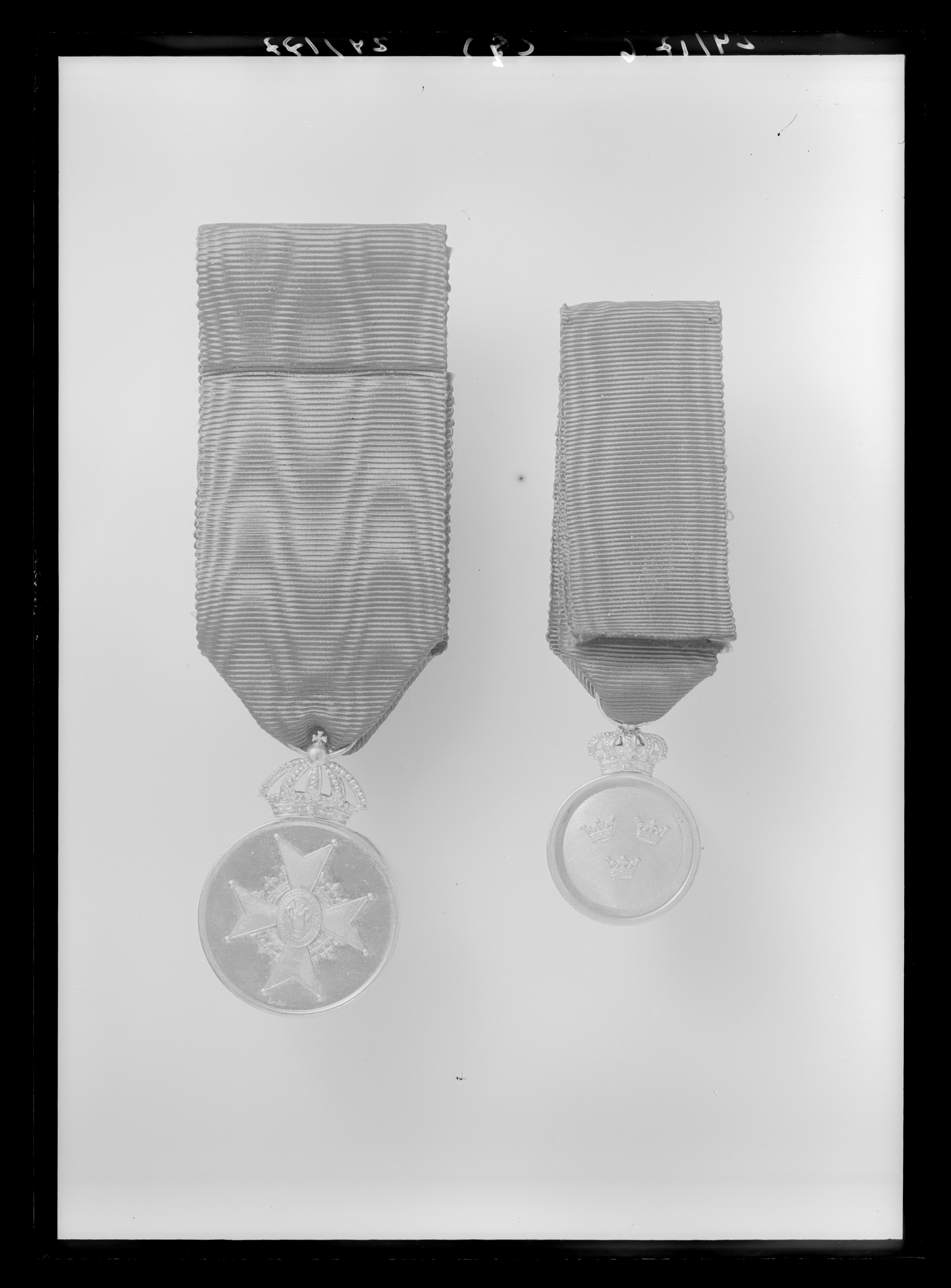
Vasa Medal, gilded silver, 8th size. Engraver: Lea Ahlborn

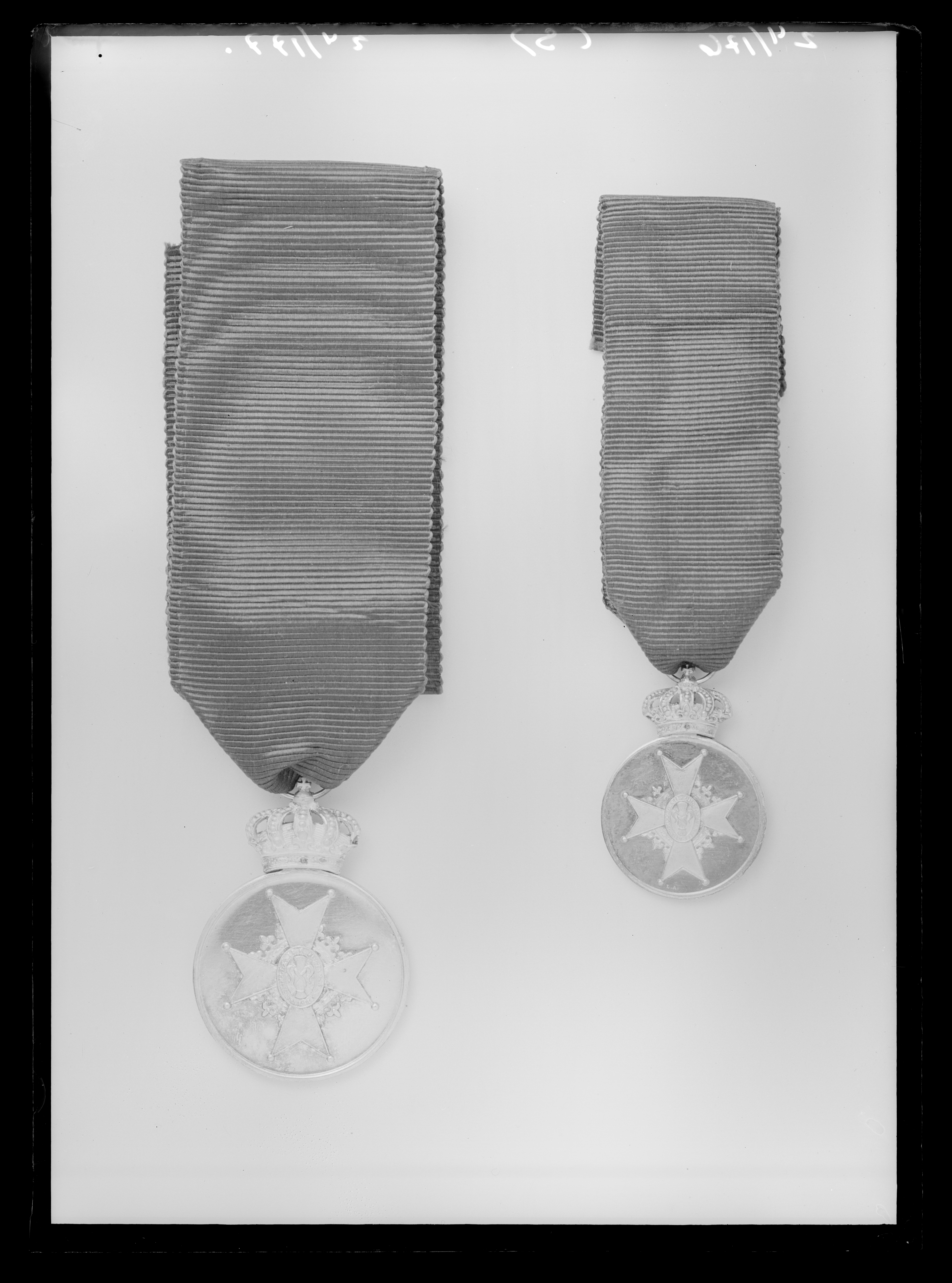
Vasa Medal, silver, 5th size. Engraver: Lea Ahlborn
