= Kisandji =

- Location in Democratic Republic of the Congo
- Coordinates: 6°15′0″S 19°16′12″E
- Country: Democratic Republic of the Congo
- Province: Kwilu

Kisandji is a community in Kwilu province, Democratic Republic of the Congo (DRC).
