= Swedish Armed Forces Medal of Merit (1995–2007) =

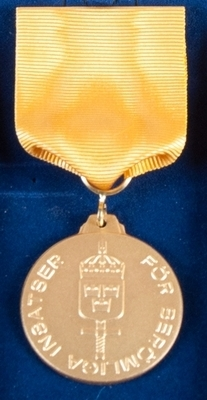
- In gold without sword.
- Type: Military medal (Decoration)
- Awarded for: Actions during combat or during war-like situations
- Country: Sweden
- Presented by: Sweden
- Eligibility: Swedish personnel
- Motto: FÖR BERÖMLIGA INSATSER ("FOR COMMENDABLE SERVICES")
- Status: No longer awarded
- Established: 1995
- Ribbon bars (with sword in gold/silver or without)

Swedish Armed Forces Medal of Merit (Swedish: Försvarsmaktens förtjänstmedalj, FMGMmsv/FMSMmsv/FMGM/FMSM) is a Swedish reward medal established in 1995 by the Swedish Armed Forces.

== History ==
The Swedish Armed Forces Medal of Merit in silver or gold has been awarded to personnel who performed extraordinary effort that benefited the Swedish Armed Forces, for example, with resourcefulness and energetically action and with an example of excellent leadership and personal commitment. The medal, which was awarded to the year 2007, usually did not come into question in connection with foreign service as far as the extraordinary efforts etc, did not have a strict national dimension.

In 2007, this medal was merged with the Swedish Armed Forces International Service Medal of Reward and instead the Swedish Armed Forces Medal of Merit was established in 2008.

== Appearance ==
The medal is of the 8th size and the ribbon is of yellow moiré. A sword in gold/silver may be attached to the ribbon.
