= Swedish Armed Forces International Service Medal =

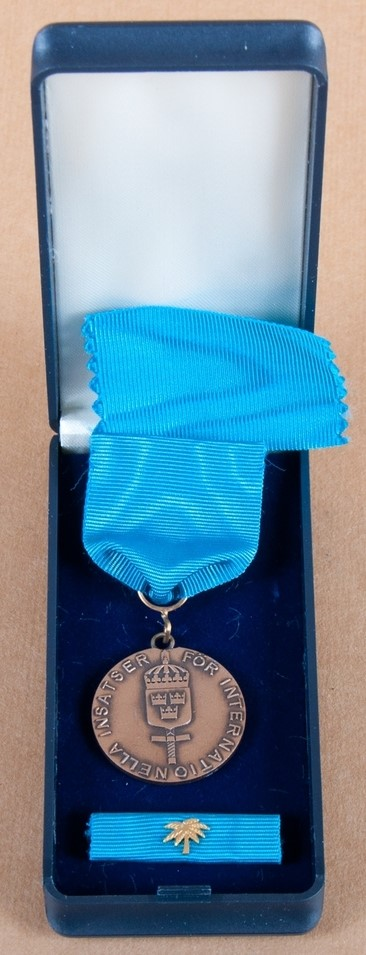
- Medal with palm in gold for mission in Saudi Arabia in 1991.
- Type: Military medal (Decoration)
- Awarded for: International service
- Country: Sweden
- Presented by: Sweden
- Eligibility: Swedish and foreign military personnel
- Motto: FÖR INTERNATIONELLA INSATSER ("FOR INTERNATIONAL SERVICE")
- Status: Currently awarded
- Established: 1991
- Ribbon bars

The Swedish Armed Forces International Service Medal (Swedish: Försvarsmaktens medalj för internationella insatser, FMintBM^{[I]}) is a Swedish reward medal instituted by the Swedish Armed Forces in 1991. The medal regulations has been revised twice, in 1994 and 2012. The medal is awarded after at least 30 days of international service.

== Name ==
Name of the award: Swedish Armed Forces International Service Medal (Försvarsmaktens medalj för internationella insatser, abbreviated FMintBM). In the event when the medal is provided with award devices in the form of a medal clasp then it is termed Swedish Armed Forces International Service Medal with clasp (Försvarsmaktens medalj för internationella insatser med spänne, abbreviated FMintBMmspä). In the event when the medal is provided with award devices in the form of a medal clasp and a laurel wreath in silver then it is termed Swedish Armed Forces International Service Medal with clasp and wreath (Försvarsmaktens medalj för internationella insatser med spänne och krans, abbreviated FMintBMmspäomkr) or the Swedish Armed Forces International Service Medal with medal clasp and laurel wreath (Försvarsmaktens medalj för internationella insatser med bandspänne och lagerkrans, abbreviated FMintBMmbspokrans).

== Basics ==
In this case, international service means an established task decided by the Swedish Riksdag or Swedish Government for the Swedish Armed Forces to conduct, a peace enforcement and/or peacekeeping military operation to other countries. Examples of such a task is missions with military units and observer missions. Exercises, readiness, service in an international staff and basing (equivalent) does not count as an international service, but is considered as a foreign official journey. The medal should not be used as an award in the event that Sweden is at war.

== Appearance and cost ==
The medal is formed of oxidized bronze and is of the 8th size (31 mm diameter). The obverse shows the heraldic arms of the Swedish Armed Forces and around the outer edge the words FÖR INTERNATIONELLA INSATSER ("FOR INTERNATIONAL SERVICE"). The reverse is blank. The medal is worn in a 35 mm blue ribbon. The ribbon can after the Supreme Commander's decision be provided with a laurel wreath in silver.

With each medal comes a detachable medal clasp in oxidized bronze with the inscription of the mission area name/country. Example: "KOSOVO". The medal clasp is attached to the lower part of the ribbon. With the medal comes a service ribbon and digits showing the number of times the individual been awarded.

The costs for the medal with accessories is charged to the appropriation for each mission. Miniature medals are not obtained on the Swedish Armed Forces' expense. The Swedish Armed Forces subsequently acquires medal clasps for all missions from 24 January 1994 onwards. In accordance with the medal regulations from 1991 and 1994, the awarded individual may wear medal clasps under the Swedish Armed Forces Carrying Regulations for awards.

== Presenting ==
The medal is awarded by the Supreme Commander or by the person that the Supreme Commander appoints and during a ceremony at the homecoming. Possession of the medal is recorded in the Swedish Armed Forces personnel accounting system. The medal is awarded to eligible after each mission that fulfills the following requirements:

- 1. The medal is awarded to Swedish Armed Forces' personnel who have completed international service for a continuous or cumulative period of at least 30 days during a twelve-month period.
  - a Only one medal per mission area and twelve-month period is awarded to the individual.
  - b At planned continuous or repeated service in the mission area that extends over twelve months (for example, during alternating service with another employee), a medal is awarded on return home after completion of completed service.
- 2. The medal may be by the Supreme Commander's medal preparation, after consulting the protocol department in the relevant country, also award foreign personnel under Swedish military leadership under the same premises as for Swedish Armed Forces personnel.
- 3. Anyone who meet the requirements for the award, but due to injury is demobilized before the individual's unit, is awarded the medal at the same time as (or adjacent to) the unit's medal ceremony (equivalent).
- 4. The individual who for reasons other than p. 3 meet the requirements for the award, but who are forced to cancel their service, may after a special decision at the Swedish Armed Forces Headquarters Operations Command (Insatsledningen) be awarded the medal.^{[II]}
- 5. Swedish Armed Forces personnel who meet the requirements for the award but who is killed before the medal is normally awarded, will be awarded the medal posthumously.

== Ownership ==
The medal is personal property and should not be returned to the Swedish Armed Forces when the holder has died.

== Specific distinction devices ==
The medal can be fitted with a laurel wreath in silver on the ribbon, which shows special merit during mission. The laurel wreath should be regarded as an award closest lower to the Swedish Armed Forces Medal of Merit in silver. With the laurel wreath comes a certificate that contains information about the recipient's title, name and citation on why the medal has been awarded. The certificate is signed by the Supreme Commander.

Recommendation with justification and documentation of facts are submitted by the commanding officer/contingent head to the Supreme Commander's medal preparation. The medal preparation presents its recommendation to the Supreme Commander who decide on the awarding in each particular case.

== Abbreviations ==
The Swedish Armed Forces International Service Medal (Försvarsmaktens medalj för internationella insatser), 1991/1994/2012:

- a. FMintBM 1991/1994

(Medal awarded 1991-1994 is worn as an individual medal since the reverse is unique.)

1. FMintBMSaudi (with palm in gold for mission in Saudi Arabia in 1991)
2. FMintBMSom (with crossed spears in bronze for mission in Somalia 1992–93)
3. FMintBMLib (with star in gold for the Swedish Release Hospital mission in Liberia 1992-1993)
4. FMintBMJug (with laurel wreath in silver for mission in Yugoslavia in 1992)
5. FMintBMGeo (with laurel wreath in silver for mission in Georgia in 1992)
6. FMintBMAfg (with dromedary in bronze for mission in Afghanistan before 11 August 2003)

- b. FMintBMmbsp (okrans) 1991/1994/2012

The FMintBM awarded from 1994 to 2012 includes on the reverse side an engraved information on the mission name and year. From 1 June 2012 the engraving was replaced and thus the additional designation ”med bandspänne” ("with medal clasp"). The Swedish Armed Forces allows the carrying of private acquired medal clasps for the missions in Cyprus, Lebanon, Bosnia, Kosovo and Macedonia for the period 1991-1994, and for all missions from 1994.

- (1) On the uniforms only one medal per mission is worn (medal clasp showing the mission area). A digit is attached to the ribbon for the number of times the medal has been awarded.
- (i) On the service ribbon a digit in silver is attached for the total number of awarded medals.
- (2) In case the laurel wreath is awarded, then it is attached in the middle of the ribbon and with the medal clasp for the mission at the bottom. The Swedish Armed Forces International Service Medal with medal clasp and laurel wreath (Försvarsmaktens medalj för internationella insatser med bandspänne och lagerkrans, FMintBMmbspokrans) is worn as an individual medal and service ribbon, with priority over other FMintBM.

== Notes ==
I. Sometimes wrongly called Försvarsmaktens belöningsmedalj med svärd för internationella insatser ("Swedish Armed Forces International Service Medal of Reward Medal with Swords") which is a different medal established in 1995.
II. The head of contingent must submit the request for awarding the medal to the Swedish Armed Forces Headquarters Operations Command (Insatsledningen). Examples of reasons for awarding can be death or severe illness of a close relative, which precludes further service.
