= Swedish Armed Forces International Service Medal of Reward =

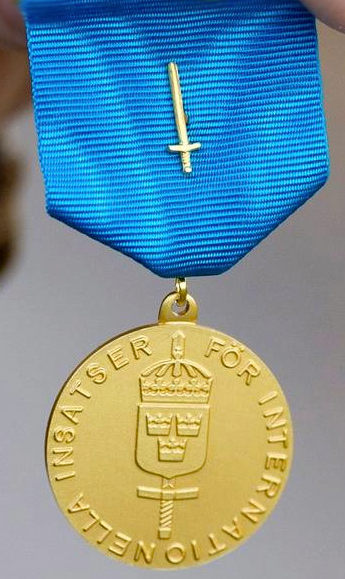
- Type: Military medal (Decoration)
- Awarded for: International service
- Country: Sweden
- Presented by: Sweden
- Eligibility: Swedish military personnel
- Motto: FÖR INTERNATIONELLA INSATSER ("FOR INTERNATIONAL SERVICE")
- Status: No longer awarded
- Established: 14 March 1995
- First award: 1995
- Final award: 2007
- Ribbon bars (gold and silver)

The Swedish Armed Forces International Service Medal of Reward (Swedish: Försvarsmaktens belöningsmedalj för internationella insatser, FMintbGMmsv or FMintbSMmsv^{[I]}) is a Swedish reward medal established by the Swedish Armed Forces in 1995.

== History ==
The regulations for the Swedish Armed Forces International Service Medal of Reward (TFG 950003) comes under the Supreme Commander's decision on 14 March 1995 which reads as follows: The medal and a certificate is awarded to individual as a reward for commendable efforts during UN service or other international service:

In 2007, this medal was merged with the Swedish Armed Forces Medal of Merit (the 1995 medal) and instead the Swedish Armed Forces Medal of Merit was established in 2008.

== Criteria ==
Criteria:

Type	Criteria	Medal	Ribbon bars
Gold medal (FMintbGMmsv)	• Extraordinarily personal courage • Repeated personal courage that meant significant good example • On death in service		
Silver medal (FMintbSMmsv)	• Great personal courage • Meritorious leadership of units in difficult conditions • Other meritorious effort under difficult conditions		

== Recipients ==
=== Gold medal ===
- 7 February 1996 - Major Thomas Jarnehed, UNPROFOR, for "repeated personal courage that set a significant example and for saving lives with tireless and hard work at great personal risk"
- 17 November 1997 - Colonel Ulf Henricsson, UNPROFOR, awarded on 4 March 1998
- 2001 - Major Jörgen Öberg, UNOMIG, for "repeated personal courage he displayed during a kidnapping in Georgia in 1999"

=== Silver medal ===
- November 1996 - Furir Roger Olsson, UNPROFOR, on 9 October 1996, a Norwegian vehicle was hit by shelling in Tuzla, Olsson together with a Norwegian colleague got the injured out and gave first aid, the risk of new shelling was imminent
- 28 June 2001 - Chief Superintendent (Kriminalinspektör) Bengt Sandberg, MONUA, for "his actions as civilian police in the UN mission in Angola from 1998 to 1999. The force to which Sandberg belonged was held hostage by the guerrillas for several weeks and had to endure severe hardships under constant gunfire"

== Notes ==
I. Officially called Försvarsmaktens belöningsmedalj med svärd för internationella insatser ("Swedish Armed Forces International Service Medal of Reward with Swords") but more often called Försvarsmaktens belöningsmedalj för internationella insatser in gold or silver (with swords), ("Swedish Armed Forces International Service Medal of Reward in gold or silver (with swords)") and sometimes wrongly called Försvarsmaktens medalj för internationella insatser i guld i blått band med svärd i guld ("Swedish Armed Forces International Service Medal in Gold with blue ribbon and sword in gold") which is a different medal which does not include swords.
