= Soldier Apprentice =

Former Canadian soldier retraining program

The Soldier Apprentice Training Program of the Canadian Army was a program designed to raise the educational level of various corps of the Canadian army after World War II and the Korean War and to graduate highly trained soldiers for future employment as non-commissioned officers NCOs and senior NCOs. This was necessary because of the lack of educational training of many of the soldiers who decided to remain in the services after these two conflicts; many of these had joined the military at a young age and in many cases had not finished their education in the rush to help defend freedom in the world at that time.

Canadian Army Badge

With the above in mind, a program was designed and implemented where young men between the ages of 16 and 17 (no younger and no older) were recruited into a seven-year program of which the first two years were a combination of military training, trades training, and additional schooling. A half day of military and a half day of scholastic training were involved during most of this two-year time frame. A graduate after this two-year period usually had increased his educational level by two grades and was also trades trained to the Group 1 level in his chosen trade. Upon graduating after two years of intensive training, the apprentices were assigned to various military units and still had five years to serve with their option of taking their release after three years. Thus it was a minimum term of five years before one could officially take his release.

Royal Canadian Air Force Ensign (1941-1968)

== Career as a soldier ==
Many graduates made the military their lifelong career and obtained promotions well beyond the goals of the initial program and became officers, up to the rank of lieutenant-general in charge of Canadian Land Forces. Many artillery apprentice graduates changed their corps during their military careers and pursued very successful careers in other corps such as the Engineers, Dental Corps, Signal Corps, Intelligence Corps, Service Corps and the Royal Canadian Air Force among others.

== Benefits ==
The two-year portion of the apprentice training program molded the minds and formed the discipline of these young men to face life with a very positive approach and to achieve the goals that they set for themselves. It also formed a union that has lasted over 50 years that one can relate to when two apprentices meet again, even among other intakes formerly unknown.

== Graduates ==
Most graduates of the program are emphatic in stating that they would do it all over again, and would recommend such a program for their children and grandchildren. Many members feel that they were well trained and given discipline and courage to face life even under the most trying of times.

In 2003, 36 years after the last graduating class graduated and 49 years after the first Artillery Apprentices appeared in Shilo, Manitoba, the first ever all-intake reunion was held with great success. Another Artillery Apprentice all-intake reunion is planned in 2006. Apprentices from several other corps also hold reunions.

The RCASC Soldier Apprentices conduct a tri yearly exercise aptly named "Operation Greenflash" in Camp Borden Ont in Late August. This year "Op Greenflash" will be held the weekend of Aug 25, 2012. A book 418 Pages dedicated to the Soldier Apprentices of Canada is now in The Canadian War Museum, The Regina Military Museum and the Camp Borden Base Library. It is available on amazon.ca the full title is: "Soldier Apprentice Memories 1953-1967 and beyond"

Canadas FIRST soldier Apprentice Harold Swain of Saskatchewan was sworn in December 1952, he went on to become a helicopter pilot, a further testament to the outstanding success of this program for young boys of Canada during the Cold War years.
