= Alån =

River in Sweden

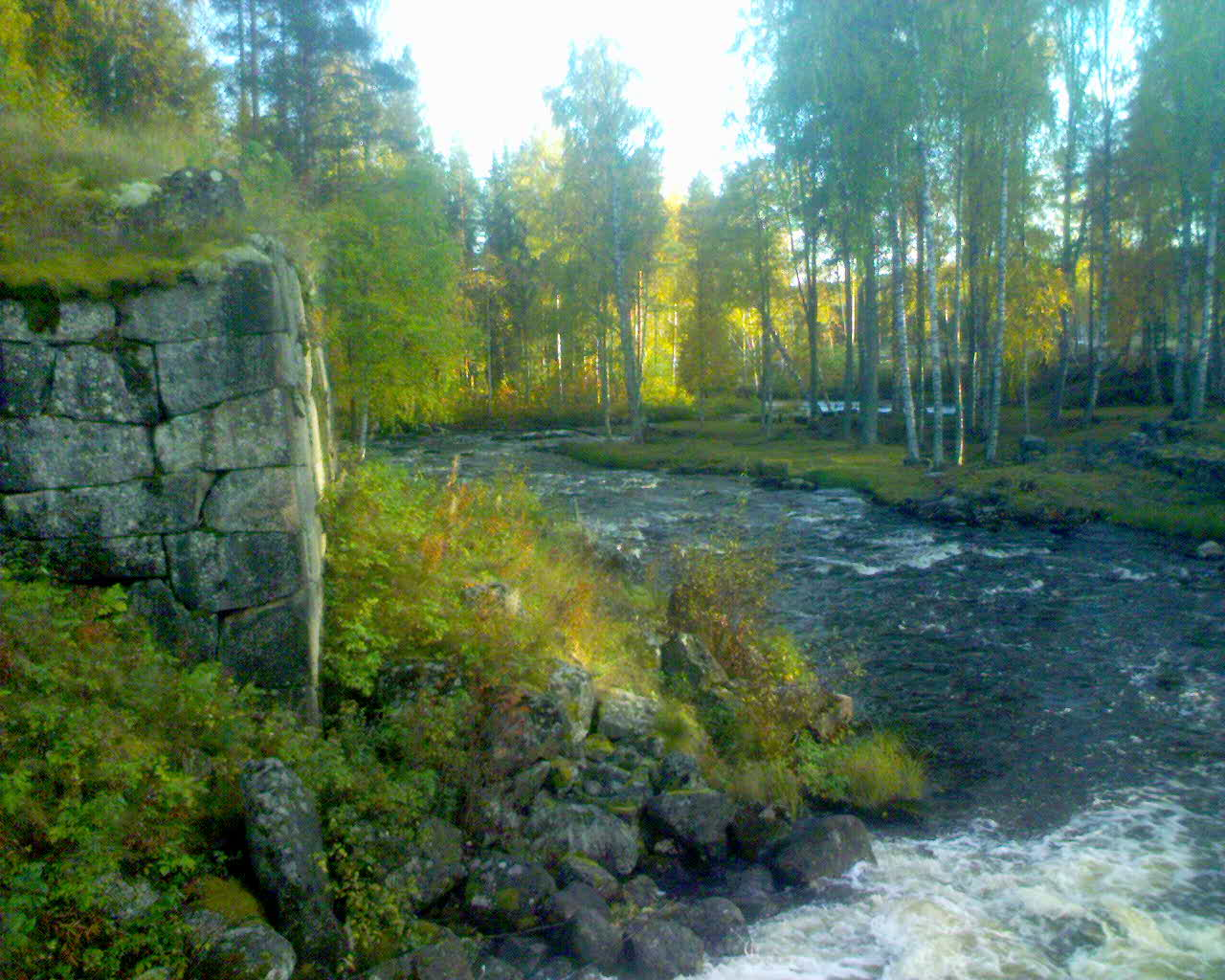

Location
- Country: Sweden

Physical characteristics
- Mouth
  - location: Ersnäs
  - coordinates: 65°32′59″N 21°47′4″E
- Length: 70 m (230 ft)
- Basin size: 592.2 km^{2} (228.6 sq mi)

Alån is a river in Norrbotten County, Sweden. It has a meander length of approximately 70 kilometres (43 mi) It has a catchment area 592 square kilometres (229 sq mi), of which almost 10% consists of lakes. Alån flows from Lake Långsjön in the municipality of Boden and then into Slyträsket, 87 meters above sea level; it then flows through the larger lake Alträsket, then through Västmarkssjön, north to Vändträsket then south again to Mockträsket before finally emptying in the Gulf of Bothnia at Ersnäs in the municipality of Luleå.

The most important section of the river is at Selet's mill, where the 19th-century industrial area has been restored including the dam. The most important source flows are the Hattbäcken and Sjöån streams. The largest tributary is Bjurbäcken (Bodbäcken) from Bjursträsket, which extends from the west in Alån at Alvik. Alån is often mistakenly called Aleån the last mile to the sea.
