= Order of Vasa =

Swedish order of chivalry

Royal Order of Vasa Kungliga Vasaorden
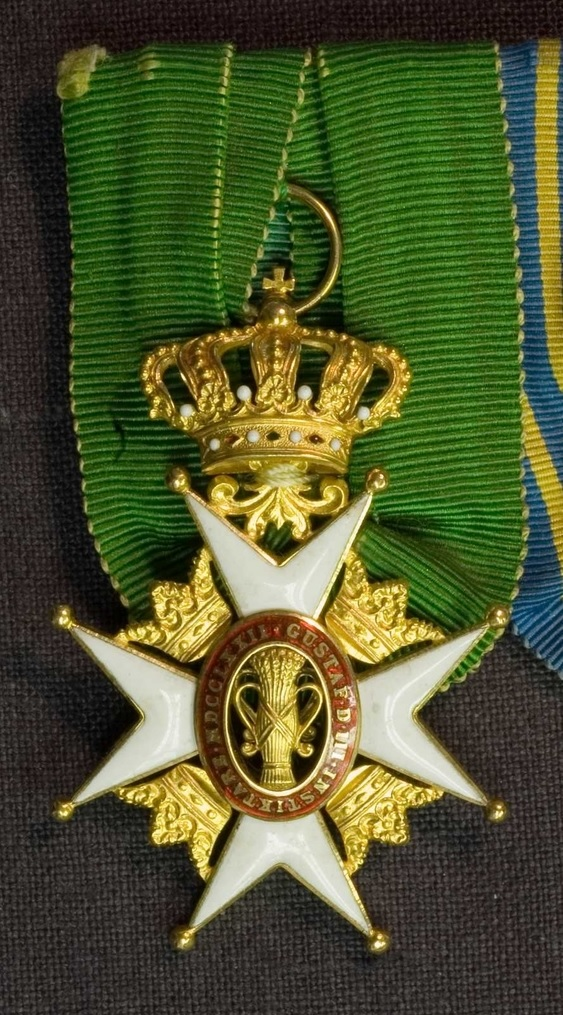
- Knight 1st Class Cross of the Swedish Order of Vasa (1945)

Awarded by the monarch of Sweden
- Type: Five grade order of merit
- Established: 1772
- Royal house: Bernadotte
- Eligibility: Swedish and foreign citizens
- Awarded for: Services to agriculture, mining, art, trade, industry, crafts and education.
- Status: Active (since 1 February 2023)
- Sovereign: King Carl XVI Gustaf
- Chancellor: Svante Lindqvist
- Grades: Commander Grand Cross (KmstkVO); Commander 1st Class (KVO1kl); Commander (KVO); Knight/Member 1st Class (RVO1kl); Knight/Member (RVO)

Statistics
- First induction: 1772
- Last induction: 28 May 2025

Precedence
- Next (higher): Royal Order of the Polar Star
- Next (lower): Order of Charles XIII
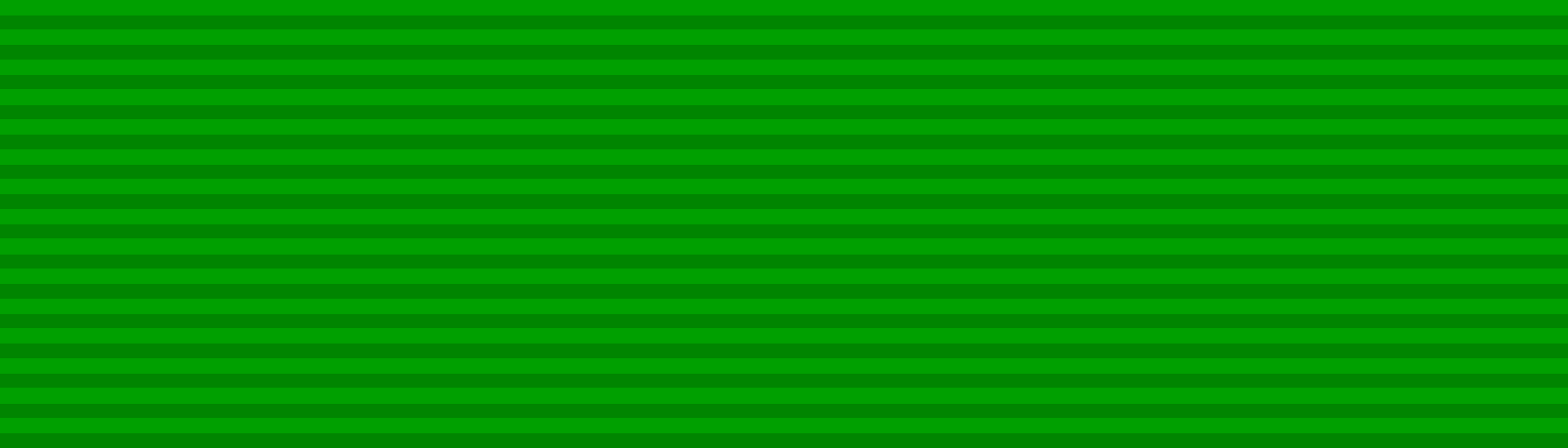
- Ribbon bar of the order

The Royal Order of Vasa (Swedish: Kungliga Vasaorden) is a Swedish order of chivalry founded on 29 May 1772 by King Gustav III. It is awarded to Swedish citizens for service to state and society especially in the fields of agriculture, mining and commerce.

== History ==
The order was founded on 29 May 1772 by King Gustav III. Its name is derived from the House of Vasa. Membership was unrestricted by birth or education, as opposed to the other orders which were reserved for nobility, military personnel or the learned professions. During the union between Sweden and Norway, the Order of Vasa was often awarded to Norwegians until the Order of Saint Olav was founded in 1847.

Following significant reforms to the Swedish honours system in 1974, the Order of Vasa and the Order of the Sword were considered dormant and membership in the Order of the Seraphim and the Order of the Polar Star were restricted to foreigners and, after 1995, the royal family.

In 2019, a parliamentary committee was instructed to establish guidelines on how to re-introduce the Swedish orders, including the Order of Vasa, into the Swedish honours system and how Swedish citizens again can be appointed to Swedish orders. The committee presented its findings in September 2021 and the Government presented a bill on the subject to the Riksdag on 19 April 2022. Following the passage of the bill by a large majority on 19 June 2022, on 20 December 2022, the Swedish Government published a new regulation that repealed the 1974 regulation, and once again opened the Royal Orders to Swedish citizens again and reactivated the Order of the Sword and the Order of Vasa, which came in effect from 1 February 2023.

On 21 March 2024, the order was awarded for the first time since 1974 to, among others, the members of ABBA.

The Swedish royal barge Vasaorden takes its name from the order.

== Grades ==
The Order had five classes:

- Commander Grand Cross – wears the badge on a collar (chain) or on a sash on the right shoulder, plus the star on the left chest;
- Commander 1st Class – wears the badge on a necklet, plus the star on the left chest;
- Commander – wears the badge on a necklet;
- Knight 1st Class – wears the badge on a ribbon on the left chest; and
- Knight – wears the badge on a ribbon on the left chest.

Before 2023, clergymen and women were not made knights; instead, they were made Ledamot av andliga ståndet ("Member of the Cloth") and Ledamot ("Member"), respectively. However, since 2023, the order makes no distinction among clergy, men and women.

Additionally, the Badge of Vasa and the Vasa Medal were both worn on a ribbon on the left chest.

== Investiture ==
Before 1975 each royal order had its own investiture ceremony. When the royal orders were reinstated, however, this practice was not restored. Instead, a new state ceremony was created in which all recipients of all orders are awarded. The new ceremony is held in the White Sea Hall of the Stockholm Palace, decorated with the banners and insignia of the royal orders. After the King and Queen have been announced by the Herald of the Royal Orders, by tapping his staff on the floor twice, and have made their entrance to the Seraphim March, the Chancellor of the Royal Orders makes an introductory speech and the King himself delivers a speech. Each recipient of each order is, one by one, one order at a time from highest to lowest in rank, announced and called upon by the Deputy Chancellor of the Royal Orders to receive the insignia from the King and shake his hand. After all recipients of a certain order have received their awards, the fanfare of that order is performed before the investiture of members of the next order begins. This ceremony was first held on 31 May 2024.

== Insignia and habit ==
- The collar of the Order is of gold, consisted of four sheaves (the emblem of King Gustav Vasa), four white-enamelled nettle leaves each bearing a shield in white above red (the emblem of Holstein, where King Adolf Frederik, the father of King Gustaf III, was born and from which his family, the House of Holstein-Gottorp, took its name) and eight crowned blue shields bearing the Three Crowns, the emblem of Sweden, each flanked by a pair of caduceus and a pair of cornucopia.
- The badge of the Order is a white-enameled Maltese Cross, in silver for the Knight class, in gilt for Knight 1st Class and above; crowns appeared between the arms of the cross. The central oval disc, which was identical on both sides, featured a golden sheaf on a black enamel background, surrounded by a red enamel ring bearing the legend Gustaf 3. Instiktare 1772 ("Instituted by Gustaf III, 1772"). The badge hangs from a royal crown. During the early days of the Order, the badge consisted of the oval disc only.
- The Badge of Vasa is similar to the knight's silver badge of the Order, but the cross had no white enamel.
- The star of the Order is a silver Maltese Cross with a silver sheaf in the centre. That of Grand Cross also had the abovementioned nettle leaf emblem in silver between the arms of the cross.
- The ribbon of the Order is green.
- Formerly the Order also had a distinctive green and white habit worn on formal occasions such as at chapters of the Order. The habit included green breeches and a green doublet with padded shoulders, both with white piping, a white sash with a gold fringe around the waist and a green mantle with a white lining. The star of the Order was embroidered over the left breast of both the doublet and the mantle. A black top hat with gold hat band and a plume of white ostrich and black egret feathers and a pair of green boots with gilded spurs completed the habit. The collar of the Order was worn over the shoulders of the doublet.

Ribbon bars
Commander Grand Cross	Commander 1st Class	Commander	Knight 1st Class	Knight

== Recipients (since 2023) ==
Year	Name	Citizenship	Main occupation	Grade
21 March 2024	Antonia Ax:son Johnson	Sweden	Director	Commander Grand Cross (KmstkVO)
21 March 2024	Benny Andersson	Sweden	Artist	Commander First Class (KVO1kl)
21 March 2024	Agnetha Fältskog	Sweden	Artist	Commander First Class (KVO1kl)
21 March 2024	Anni-Frid Lyngstad (Reuss)	Sweden	Artist	Commander First Class (KVO1kl)
21 March 2024	Björn Ulvaeus	Sweden	Artist	Commander First Class (KVO1kl)
21 March 2024	Eva Rydberg	Sweden	Actress	Commander (KVO)
21 March 2024	Bettan Byvald	Sweden	Socionom	Knight First Class (RVO1kl)
21 March 2024	Thomas Sjöström	Sweden	Business Area Manager	Knight (RVO)
30 April 2025	Marie Ehrling	Sweden	Director	Commander First Class (KVO1kl)
30 April 2025	Nina Stemme	Sweden	Hovsångare	Commander First Class (KVO1kl)
30 April 2025	Gunilla Arhén	Sweden	Director	Commander (KVO)
30 April 2025	Ole Wiggo Bang	Sweden	Former opera director of Wermland Opera	Commander (KVO)
30 April 2025	Marie Göranzon Malmsjö	Sweden	Actress	Commander (KVO)
30 April 2025	Håkan Lans	Sweden	Doctor of Technology, honoris causa	Commander (KVO)
30 April 2025	Crister Stark	Sweden	Director	Commander (KVO)
30 April 2025	Karin Bodin	Sweden	Director	Knight First Class (RVO1kl)
30 April 2025	Ulf Elfving	Sweden	Journalist	Knight First Class (RVO1kl)
30 April 2025	Ingrid Le Roux	Sweden	Physician	Knight (RVO)
30 April 2025	Staffan Braw	Sweden	Business Developer	Vasa Medal
30 April 2025	Kim Norman	Sweden	Photographer	Vasa Medal

== Images ==
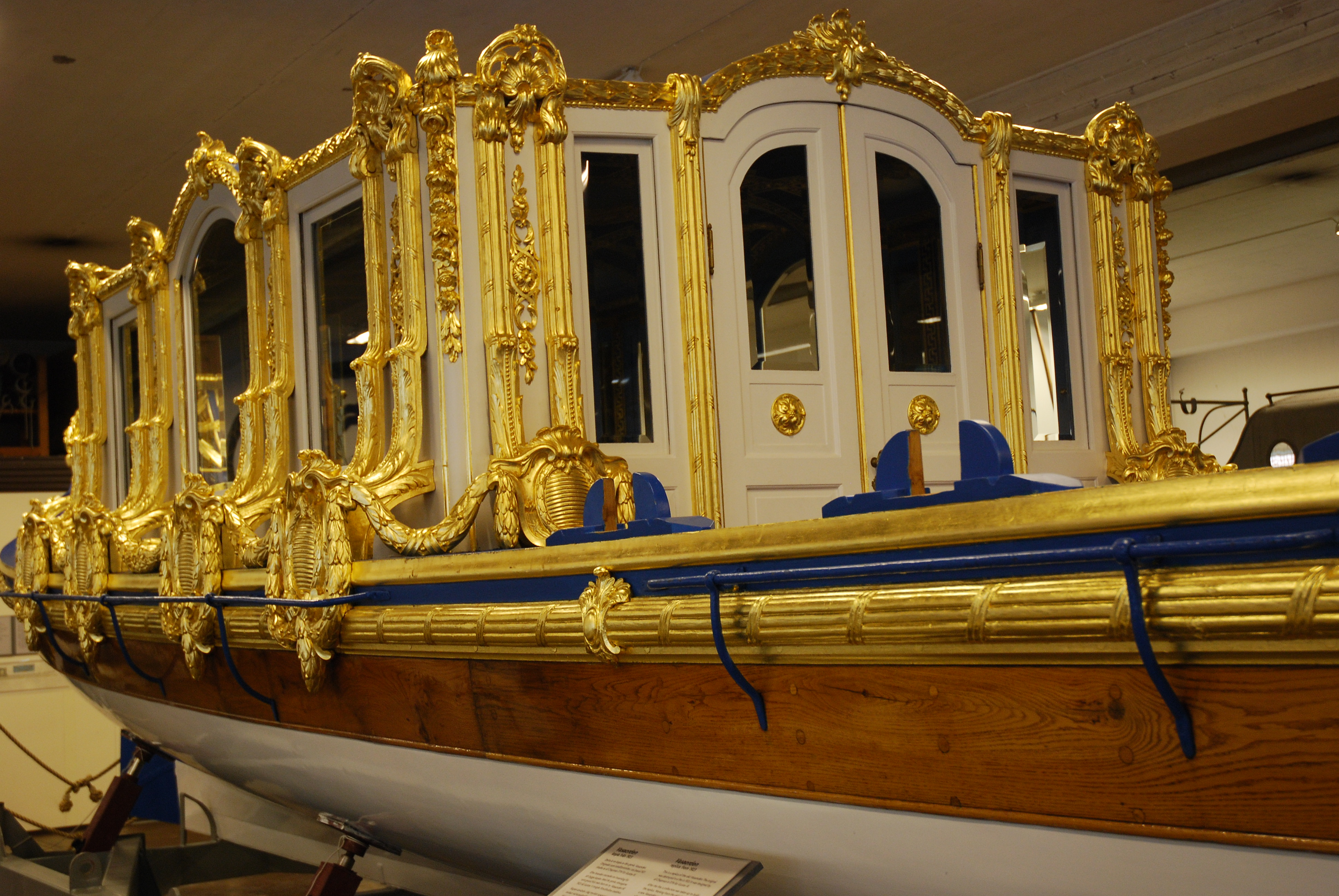
The royal barge built for Gustav III, named Vasaorden, is still used on rare ceremonial occasions

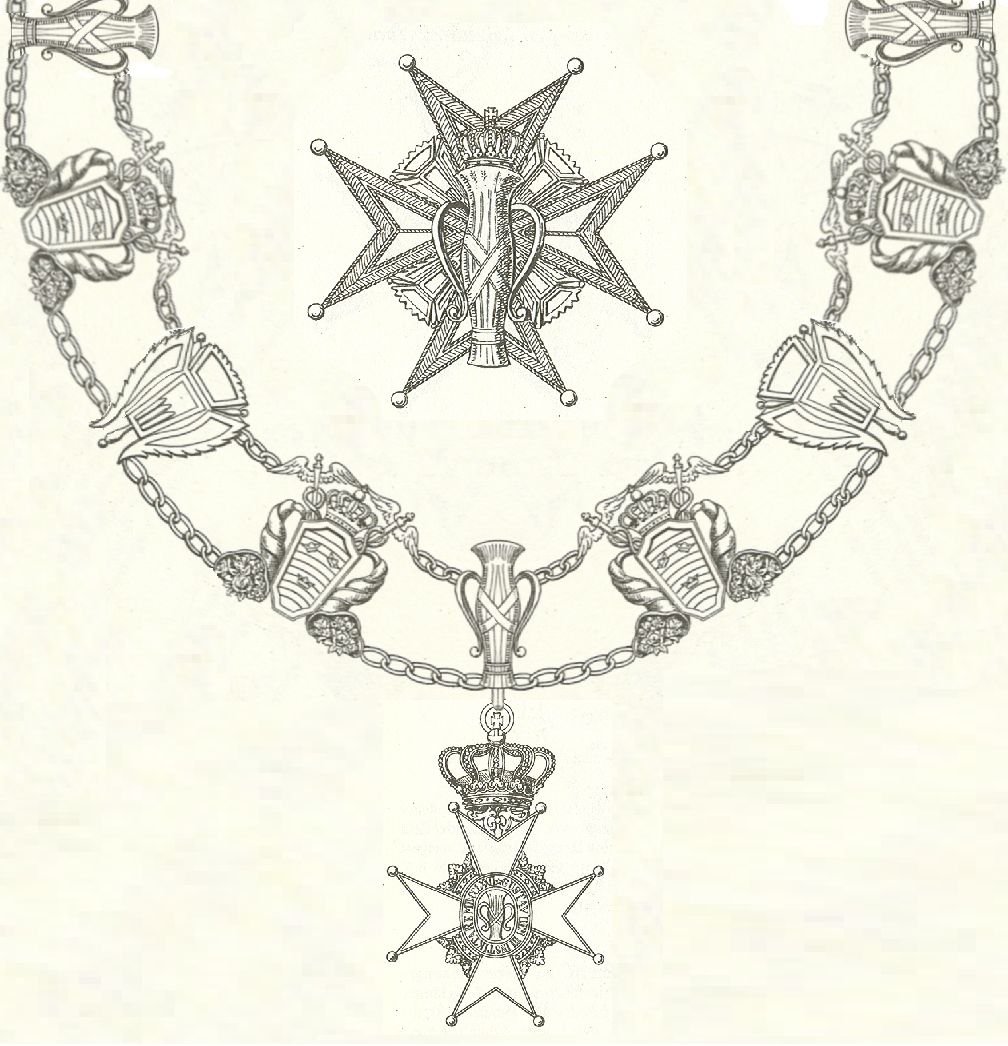
Star and collar of the order.

== See also ==
- Orders, decorations, and medals of Sweden
