= Swedish Armed Forces Reserve Officer Medal =

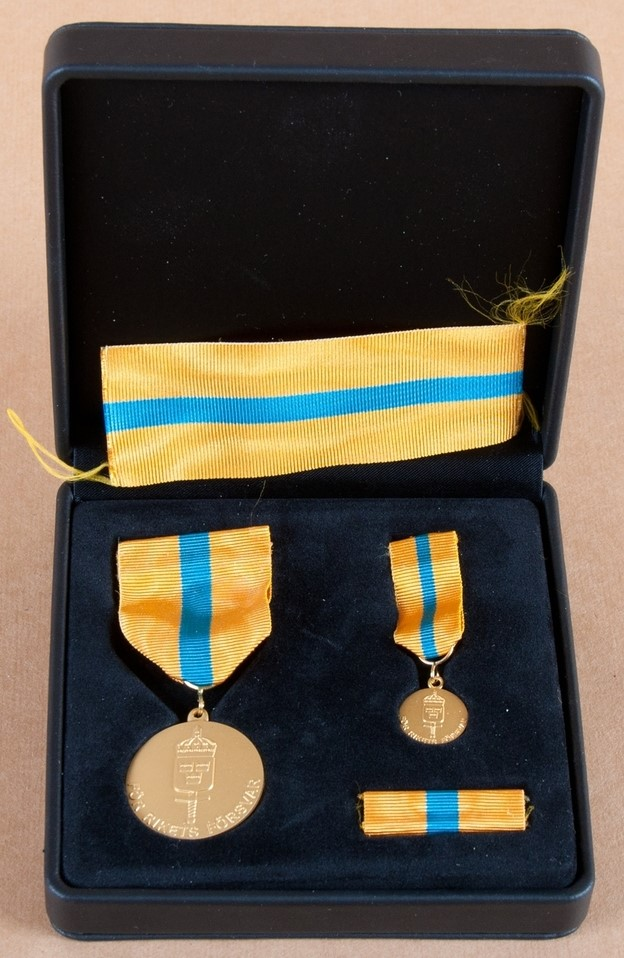
- Type: Military medal (Decoration)
- Country: Sweden
- Presented by: Sweden
- Eligibility: Swedish reserve officers
- Motto: FÖR RIKETS FÖRSVAR ("FOR NATIONAL DEFENCE")
- Status: Currently awarded
- Established: 17 January 2003
- Ribbon bar

Swedish Armed Forces Reserve Officer Medal (Swedish: Försvarsmaktens reservofficersmedalj, FMresoffGM and FMresoffSM) is a Swedish reward medal instituted by the Swedish Armed Forces and is awarded to reserve officers.

== History ==
The medal was instituted on 17 January 2003 by the Supreme Commander's letter 16991:64851.

== Appearance ==
The medal is made in two versions, silvered bronze ("silver") and gilded bronze ("gold") with 31 mm diameter. The obverse shows the Swedish Armed Forces heraldic arms and around the outer edge the text "For national defense" (För rikets försvar). The reverse is blank with a laurel wreath around the outer edge and can be by the unit be fitted with the current name or personal identity number and or year in engraving. The medal is also made in miniature. The ribbon is yellow moiré with a broad blue stripe on the middle.

== Presenting ==
The medal and a diploma is awarded to reserve officers who completed the professional officer exam or reserve officer exam and has signed and completed employment contract as a reserve officer with the Swedish Armed Forces with approved credentials. Medal in gold may be awarded upon termination of employment after at least 20 years of employment. The commanding officer (or equivalent) in the last employment decides to award the medal. The medal can be awarded only once. The medal can be awarded posthumously. The medal is awarded as soon as possible after the award decision has been taken. The medal is awarded by the commanding officer (or equivalent) at an appropriate ceremony in close connection with the termination of employment.

== Wearing ==
The medal may be worn on the uniform according to the Supreme Commander's regulations on decorations to uniforms (FFS 1990:37). The award may be worn on the left side of the chest immediately after the royal and government medals. Instead of a medal, a service ribbon may be worn.
