= United Nations Emergency Force Medal =

Service medal of the United Nations

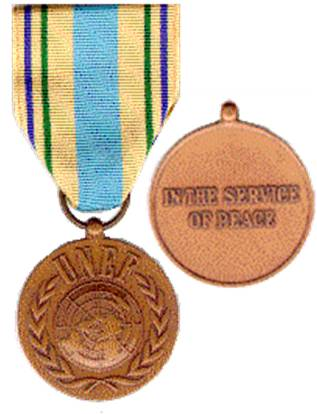
- United Nations Emergency Force medal
- Type: Service medal
- Awarded for: 90 days service between 7 November 1956 and 19 May 1967
- Presented by: the United Nations
- Eligibility: Soldiers with UNEF mission
- Ribbon bar of the medal

Precedence
- Next (higher): Varies by country
- Next (lower): Varies by country

The United Nations Emergency Force Medal was a service medal of the United Nations for service in the United Nations Emergency Force between 7 November 1956 and 19 May 1967.

== History ==
In 1956, Egypt came into conflict with the combined forces of Israel, France, and the United Kingdom resulting in the Suez Crisis. Combined political pressure from the United States, the Soviet Union and the United Nations resulted in the withdrawal of French, British and Israeli forces from Egyptian territory and the cessation of hostilities. To maintain the peace the United Nations established its first Peacekeeping force, the United Nations Emergency Force (UNEF). Brazil, Canada, Colombia, Denmark, India, Norway, Sweden and Yugoslavia provided troops to serve in the UNEF. Finland and Indonesia also provided troops for the mission but for a short time. The mission lasted from November 1956 until June 1967. Ninety days of service with the UNEF was required for award of the medal.

== Appearance ==
The medal, similar in appearance to other United Nations Medals, is a circular bronze medal 35 millimetres (1.4 in) in diameter. The obverse depicts the official emblem of the United Nations, a world map oriented from the north pole. Above the emblem are the letters UNEF. The reverse is plain except for the words "In the Service of Peace" in relief.

The medal is suspended from a sand yellow ribbon with an 8 mm central stripe of light blue. On either side of the central stripe, 3 mm from the edge, is a 1 mm stripe of dark blue 2 mm apart from a 1 mm stripe of dark green. The sand yellow color of the ribbon represents the Sinai while the wide central stripe represented the UN. Of the two thin stripes, the blue represents the Suez Canal, and the green represents the Nile River Valley.
