= Veterans Day (Sweden) =

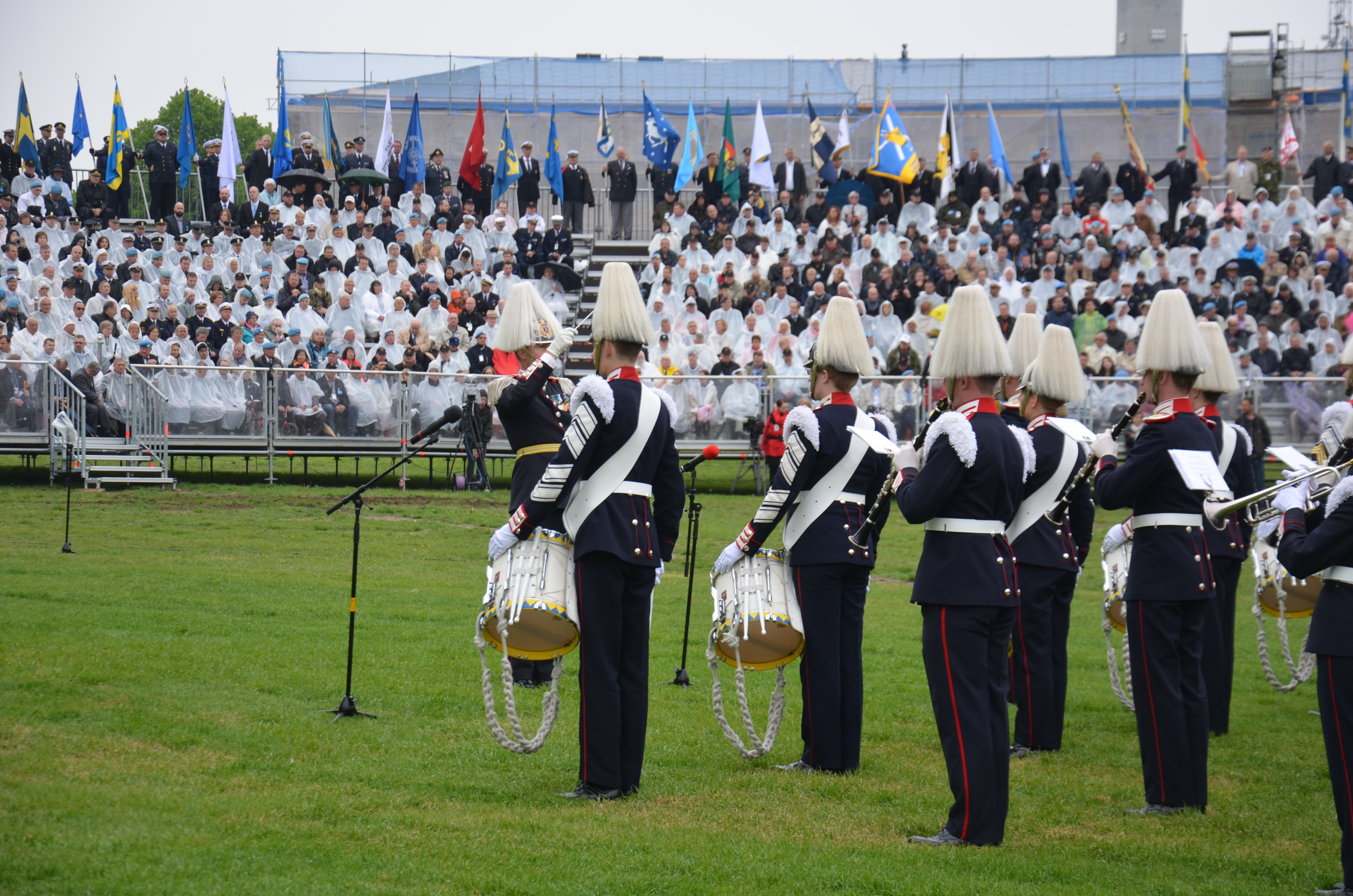
- Veterans Day 2013 at the Maritime Museum
- Official name: Veterandagen
- Observed by: Sweden
- Celebrations: Ceremony at the Maritime Museum, Stockholm
- Date: 29 May
- Next time: 29 May 2026
- Frequency: Annual

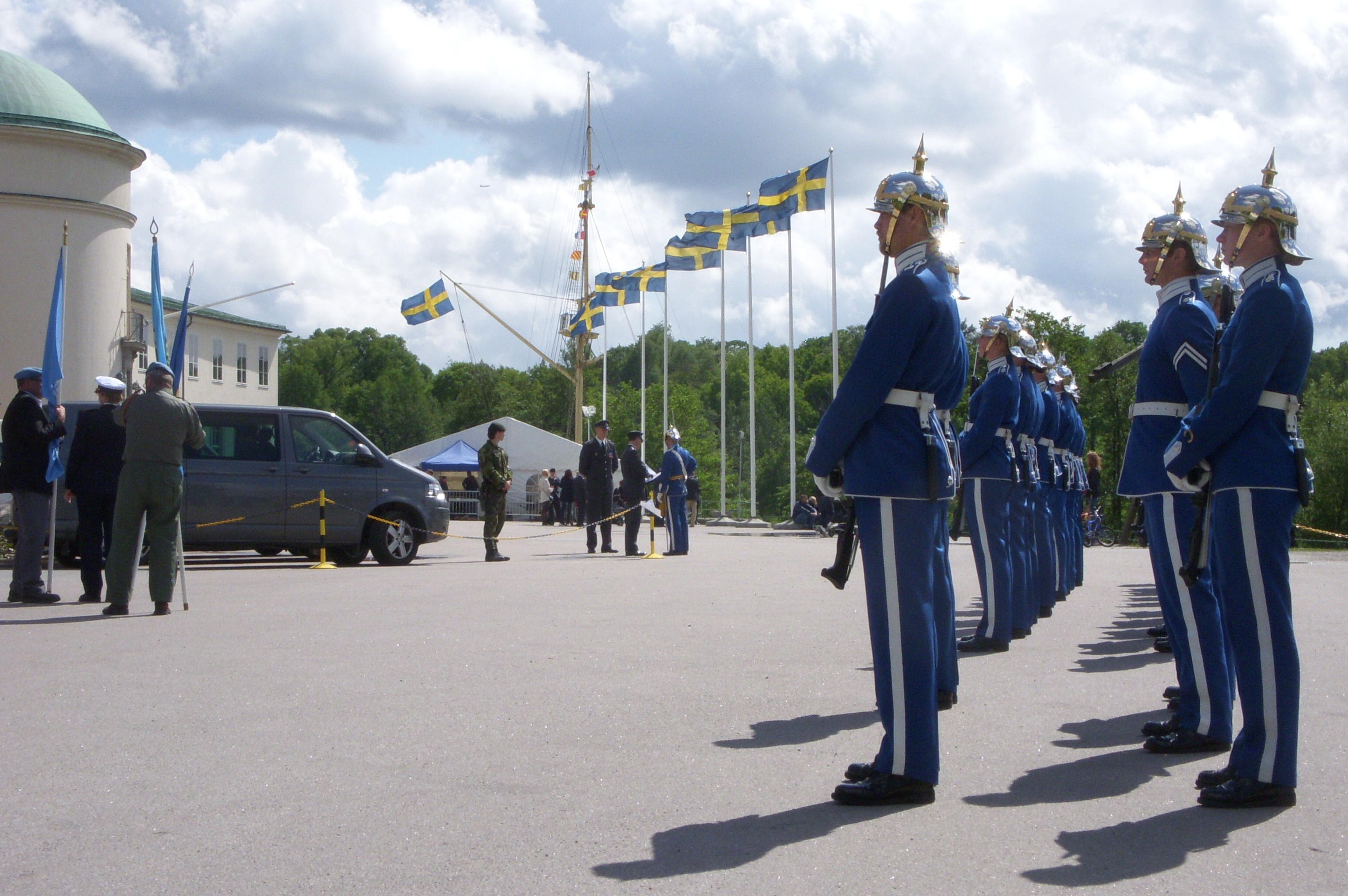
Veterans' Day 2011 at the Maritime Museum.

Veterans Day (Swedish: Veterandagen) is observed annually in Sweden on May 29 at the Maritime Museum in Stockholm in honor of people who are or have been serving with the Swedish Armed Forces in international military operations, as well as commemorating those who died during their service. It coincides with the International Day of United Nations Peacekeepers. Members of the Swedish royal family attend the ceremony.
