= List of recipients of the Order of the Sword =

This is a list of the recipients of the Royal Order of the Sword from 2023 and onward:

== Carl XVI Gustaf ==
Year	Name	Citizenship	Main occupation	Grade
29 September 2023	Ryan S. Sweeney	United States	United States Air Force Colonel	Commander (KSO)
10 November 2023	Stefano Silvestrini	Italian Air Force	Italian Air Force Colonel	Commander (KSO)
22 January 2024	Patrick Greene	United States	United States Navy Captain	Commander (KSO)
21 March 2024	Dennis Gyllensporre	Sweden	Swedish Army Lieutenant General	Commander Grand Cross (KmstkSO)
21 March 2024	Ulf Henricsson	Sweden	Swedish Army Senior Colonel	Commander 1st Class (KSO1kl)

== See also ==
- Orders, decorations, and medals of Sweden
- List of knights of the Order of the Seraphim (the whole historical list)
- List of recipients of the Order of the Polar Star
- List of recipients of the Order of Vasa
- List of knights of the Order of Charles XIII (the whole historical list)
