= Ryan Sweeney =

Ryan Sweeney may refer to:

- Ryan S. Sweeney
- Ryan Sweeney (baseball)
- Ryan Sweeney (footballer)
