= Order of the Sword =

Swedish order of chivalry and military decoration

Royal Order of the Sword Kungliga Svärdsorden
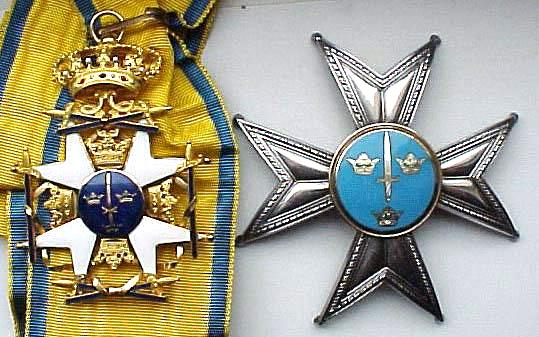
- Badge and star of the order

Awarded by the monarch of Sweden
- Type: Five grade order of merit
- Motto: Pro Patria
- Eligibility: Military personnel
- Criteria: Valour during war and service to the Armed Forces during peacetime.
- Status: Active (since 1 February 2023)
- Sovereign: King Carl XVI Gustaf
- Chancellor: Svante Lindqvist
- Grades: Commander Grand Cross (KmstkSO); Commander 1st Class (KSO1kl); Commander (KSO); Knight 1st Class (RSO1kl); Knight (RSO)

Statistics
- First induction: 1748
- Last induction: 28 May 2025

Precedence
- Next (higher): Royal Order of the Seraphim
- Next (lower): Royal Order of the Polar Star
- Ribbon bar of the Order of the Sword

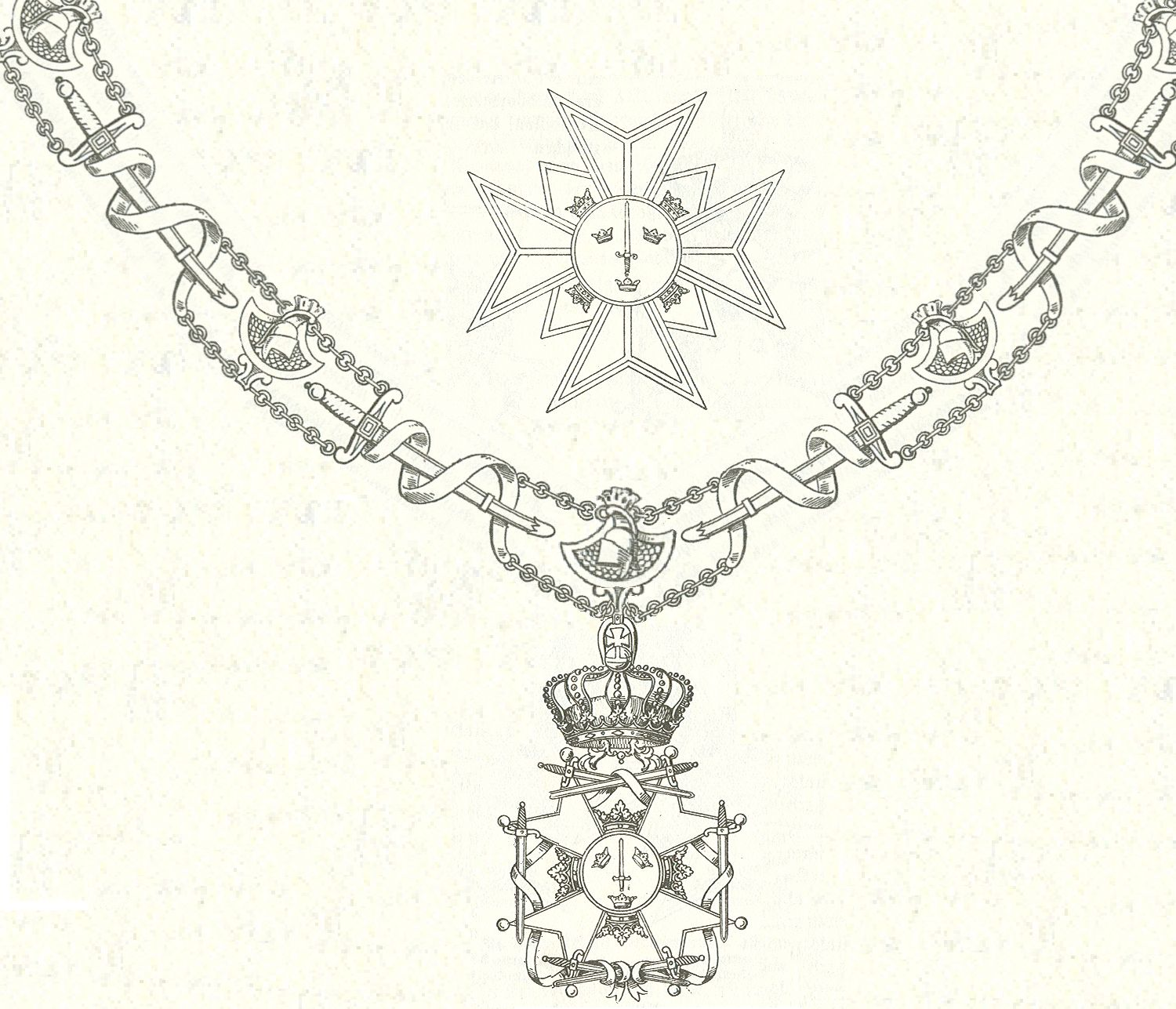
Collar and star of the order

The Royal Order of the Sword (officially: Royal Order of the Sword; Swedish: Kungliga Svärdsorden) is a Swedish order of chivalry and military decoration created by King Frederick I of Sweden on 23 February 1748, together with the Order of the Seraphim and the Order of the Polar Star. The motto of the order is in Latin: Pro Patria (which means "For [the] Fatherland").

Awarded to officers, and originally intended as an award for bravery and particularly long or useful service, it eventually became a more or less obligatory award for military officers after a certain number of years in service. There were originally three grades, Knight, Commander and Commander Grand Cross, but these were later multiplied by division into classes. On 20 December 2022, the Swedish Government published a new regulation that repealed the 1974 regulation, and once again opened the Royal Orders to Swedish citizens again and reactivated the Order of the Sword and the Order of Vasa, which came in effect from 1 February 2023.

== History ==
The order was created by King Frederick I in 1748, along with two other orders, the Order of the Seraphim and the Order of the Polar Star. In 1788, King Gustav III created two new grades of the order, which could only be bestowed in war time:

- "Knight Grand Cross First Class" – The cross is in shape similar to the Knight's cross, but as large as the Grand Cross badge and is worn on a necklet, and the star is in the shape of an upraised silver sword. It was awarded to division commanders of at least the rank of a major general for achieving a major victory in battle. Even the monarch could only wear the insignia Knight Grand Cross by the unanimous decision of his officers (e.g., Gustavus III, Charles XIII and Charles XIV John.
- "Knight Grand Cross" – The cross is in shape similar to the Knight's cross, but as large as the Grand Cross badge and is worn on a necklet, and the star is in the shape of two crossed upright silver swords.

These grades proper were only given to commissioned officers, but an affiliated decoration, the Svärdstecken ("Badge of the Sword"), introduced in 1850, was given to non-commissioned officers; one thus decorated would call himself a svärdsman ("Swordsman"). A Medal of the Sword was also introduced for enlisted men. Both the non-commissioned officers and the enlisted men had to have served for at least sixteen years to qualify for the Badge and Medal respectively.

In 1952 a special medal of distinction was added to the order. These could only be bestowed in wartime. They are the War Cross of the Order of the Sword in Gold, in Silver and in Bronze. They are worn on the same ribbon as the order and the medal consist of the cross saltire of the Order struck in gold, silver or bronze, with an upraised sword behind central medallion bearing the Swedish three crowns and in the spaces between the upper and lower arms of the cross. At the top of the points of the upper arms of the cross and of the sword is a small royal crown.

King Carl XVI Gustaf of Sweden frequently wears his Commander Grand Cross necklet and badge. In 2019, a parliamentary committee was instructed to establish guidelines on how to re-introduce the Swedish orders, including the Order of the Sword, into the Swedish honours system and how Swedish citizens again can be appointed to Swedish orders. The committee presented its findings in September 2021 and the Government has declared that a bill on the subject will be presented to the Riksdag on 19 April 2022. The Bill was passed on 15 June 2022, and the Order of the Sword was re-introduced into the Swedish honours system on 1 February 2023. On 29 September 2023, Colonel Ryan S. Sweeney, defense attaché at the American embassy in Stockholm, became the first person since 1974 to receive the order.

== Investiture ==
Formerly the reception of new Commanders Grand Cross took place without religious ceremonies in the royal apartments, but in the presence of the other Commanders Grand Cross of the Order, of the Knights of the Seraphim, and the Commanders Grand Cross of all the other orders. By the oath the Commander elect bound himself “to defend with life and property the Evangelical-Lutheran religion, to serve faithfully the King and the country, and to combat courageously against the foes of the country.” When a foreigner was elected a Commander of the Grand Cross, the insignia were sent to him abroad, while he, in his turn, transmitted to the archives of the Order a statement of the services rendered by him.

When the royal orders were reinstated, however, the old ceremony was not restored. Instead a new state ceremony was created in which all recipients of all orders are awarded. The new ceremony is held in the White Sea Hall of the Stockholm Palace, decorated with the banners and insignia of the royal orders. After the King and Queen are announced by the Herald of the Royal Orders, tapping his staff on the floor twice, and make their entrance to the Seraphim March, the Chancellor of the Royal Orders makes an introduction speech and the King himself delivers a speech each recipient of all orders are, one by one, one order at a time from highest to lowest in rank, announced and called upon by the Deputy Chancellor of the Royal Orders to receive their insignia from the King and shake his hand. After all recipients of a certain order have received their award, the fanfare of that order is performed before the investiture of members of the next order begins. This ceremony was first held on 31 May 2024.

== Grades ==
The Order of the Sword in peacetime had five classes:

- Commander Grand Cross – wears the badge on a collar (chain) or on a sash on the right shoulder, plus the star on the left chest;
- Commander 1st Class – wears the badge on a necklet, plus the star on the left chest;
- Commander – wears the badge on a necklet;
- Knight 1st Class – wears the badge on a ribbon on the left chest;
- Knight – wears the badge on a ribbon on the left chest;

== Knight of the Grand Cross ==
In 1788 King Gustaf III, during the Russo-Swedish War, instituted another class of the order that could only be bestowed in wartime and only to senior officers whose conduct had had a significant effect on the war. Not even the King of Sweden can wear the decoration until a "Swedish army under His command has been victorious, either through combat or conquest". The special class is called Knight of the Grand Cross. The breast star is in the shape of an upright sword, and is worn on the left pocket and the badge is worn around the neck.

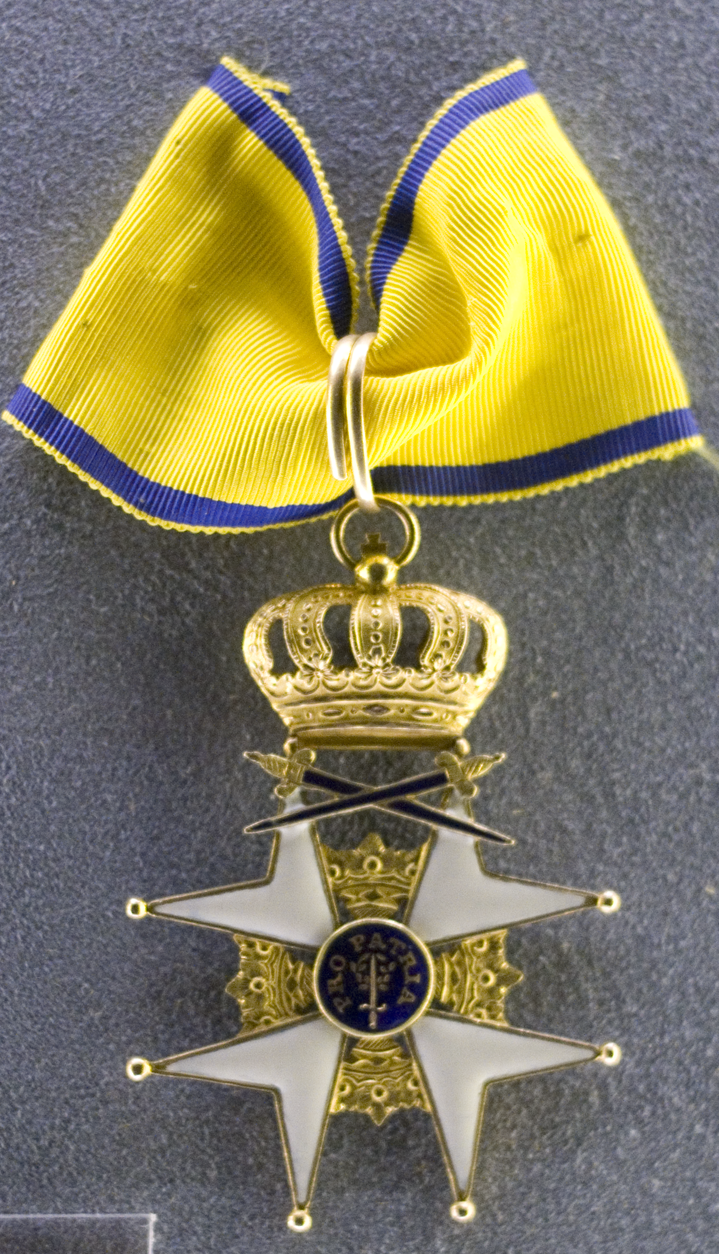
Badge

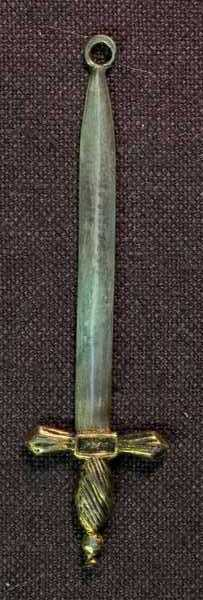
Breast star

Ribbon

== Medals and badges ==
The order also encompasses two medals;

- Badge of the Sword (Svärdstecknet) – reserved for Non-commissioned officers
- Medal of the Sword (Svärdsmedaljen) – reserved for enlisted men

Both medals are worn on a ribbon on the left chest.

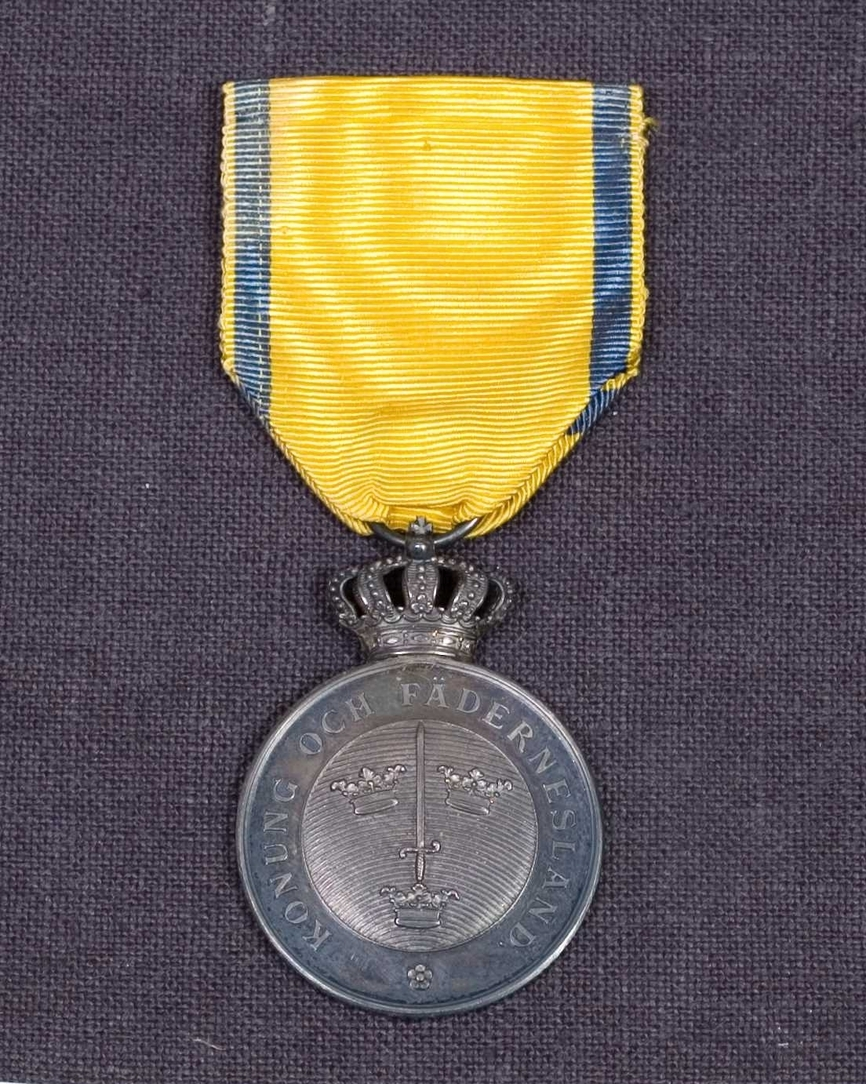
Medal of the Sword, with the inscription Konung och Fädernesland (King and Fatherland)

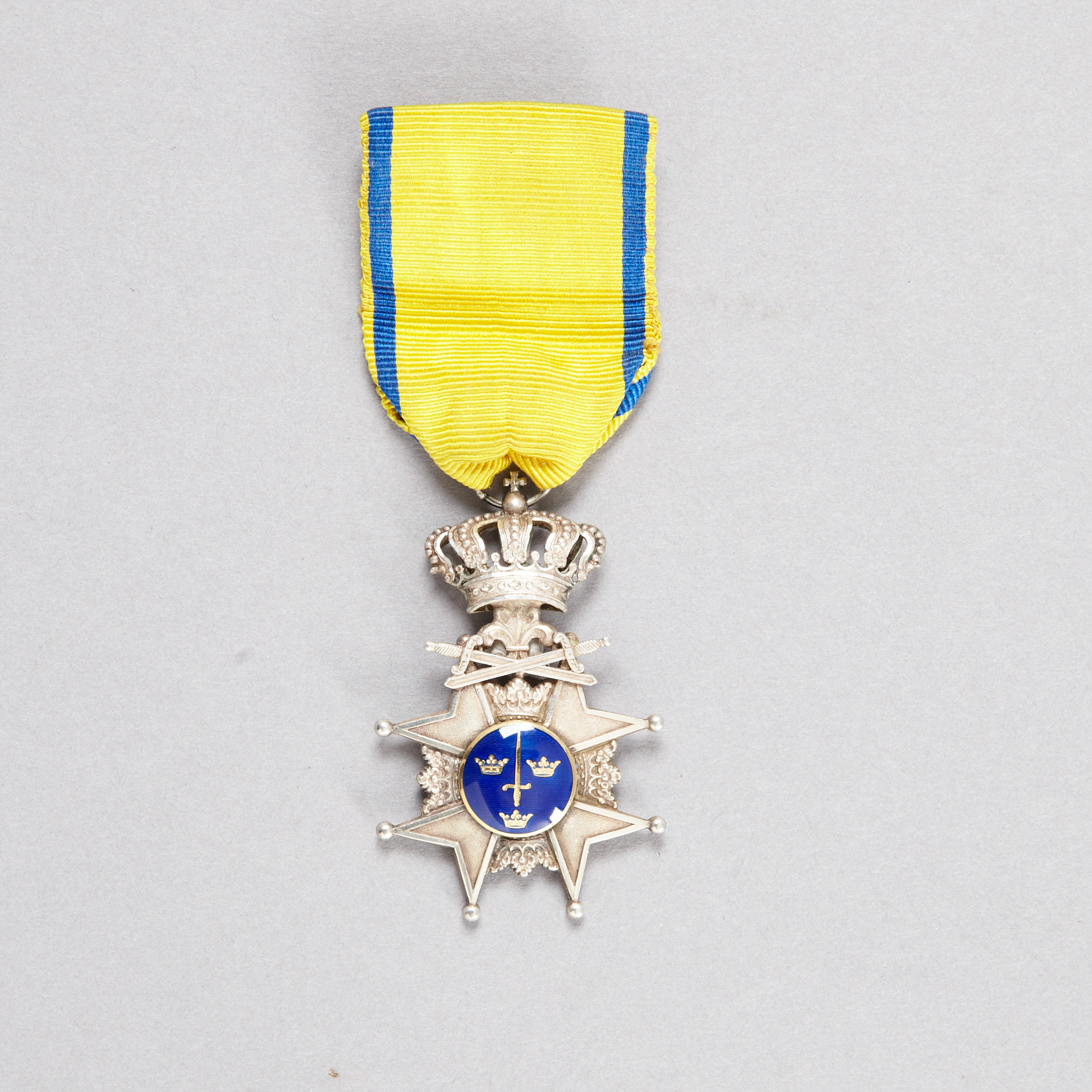
Badge of the Sword.

== Insignia and habit ==
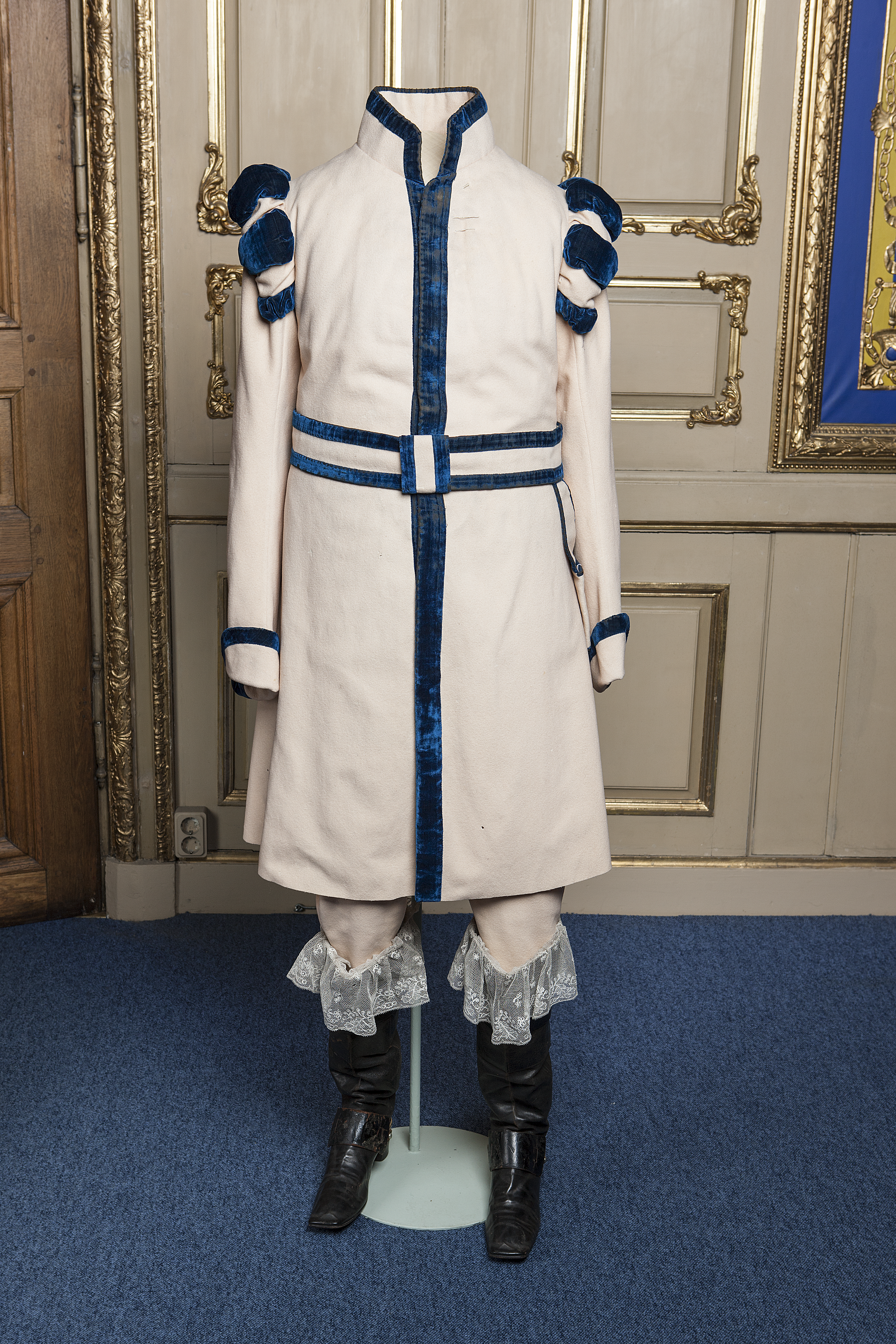
Habit of a Commander Grand Cross of the Order of the Sword, from the 1820s

The badge of the Order is a white enamelled Maltese Cross in saltire (i.e. X-shaped), in silver for Knight class and in gold for the Knight 1st Class and above; gold open crowns appeared between the arms of the cross. The obverse central medallion bears an upright gold sword between three gold crowns on a blue enamelled background; the reverse central medallion has an upright gold sword intersecting a gold laurel wreath, and the Latin legend "Pro Patria" (For Fatherland) on a blue enamelled background. A pair of crossed gold swords in blue enamelled scabbards with downward turned blades lie across the opening between the upper arms of the cross at the top of the badge. In addition the badges of the two highest classes also have an upright similar gold and blue sword across the openings at the sides of the cross and an identical pair of crossed gold and blue swords with downwards turned blades across the opening between the lower arms of the cross at the bottom of the badge, the pairs of crossed swords are each tied together and the side swords are bound to the cross by a single gold ribbon which crosses the arms of the cross from behind. The badge hanged from a gold and enamelled royal crown.

- The collar of the Order is of gold in the form of eleven gold swords in blue enamelled scabbards with gold belts connected by gold chains and alternating with eleven gold pelte shields each bearing a blue enamelled helmet (trophy of arms).
- The star of the Order is a silver Maltese Cross, the central medallion bearing the same upright sword between three gold crowns on a blue enamelled background as the badge. The star of the Grand Cross also has golden crowns over short silver triangular rays between the arms of the cross.
- The ribbon of the Order is yellow with blue stripes near its borders (i. e., the Swedish national colours).

Formerly the Order also had a distinctive blue and yellow habit worn on formal occasions such as at chapters of the Order. The habit included yellow trousers, a yellow knee length coat with blue shoulder tabs and a yellow girdle, each bordered in blue, blue mantle lined with blue satin and a blue shoulder sash with a gold fringe. The star of the Order was embroidered over the left breast of both the coat and the mantle. A black top hat with gold hat band and a plume of white ostrich and black egret feathers and a pair of black boots with gilded spurs completed the habit. The collar of the Order was worn over the shoulders of the coat.

=== Insignia of the medals ===
- The Badge of the Sword is similar to the knight's silver badge of the Order. The front central medallion is enamelled but the arms of the cross have no white enamel nor is the back of this badge enamelled.
- The Medal of the Sword is of also of silver and round with a royal crown on it upper side. The Medal bears the sword and three crown of the badge of the Order surrounded by a band with the Swedish words, "Konung och Fädernesland" (King and Fatherland).

== Gallery ==
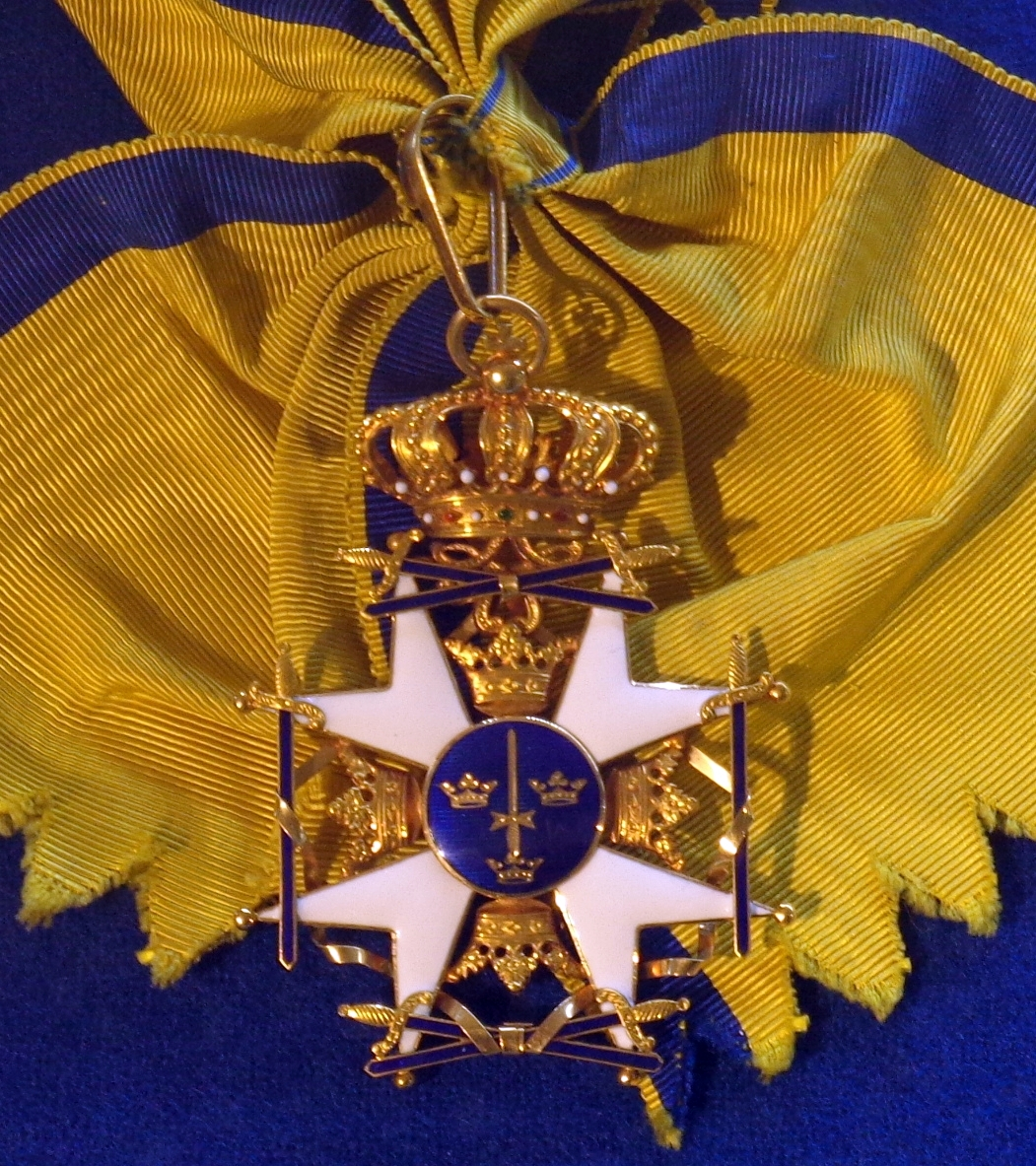
Grand Cross badge and sash.

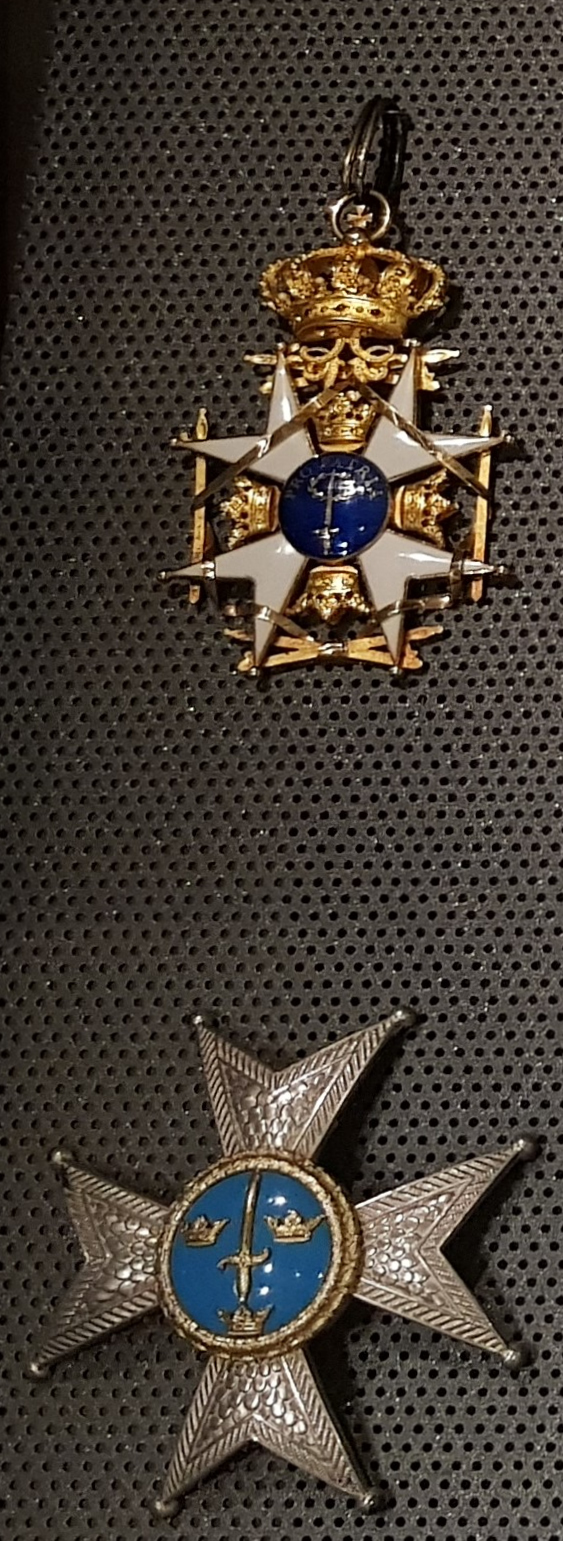
Commander 1st Class set of insignia.

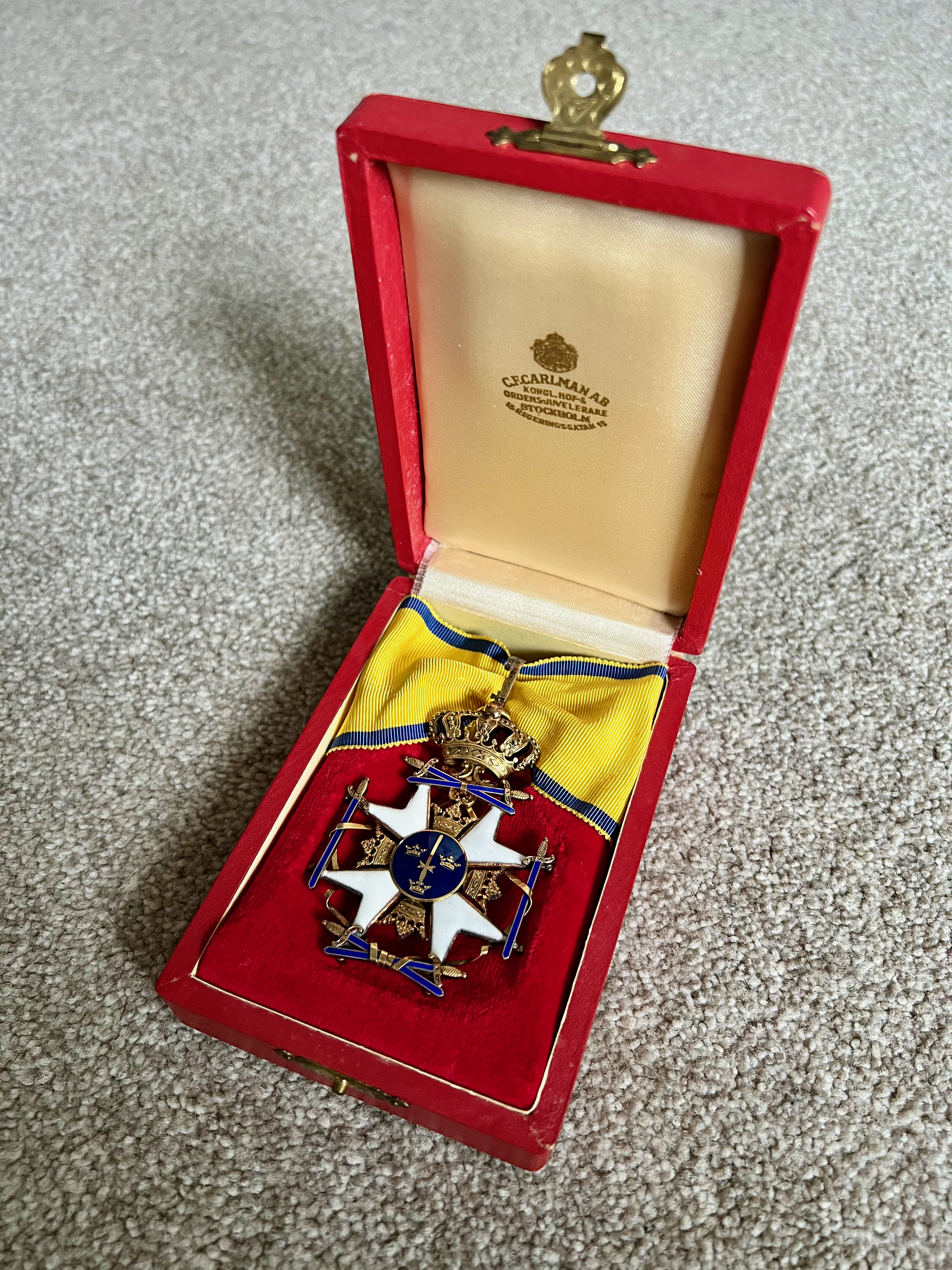
Commander grade.

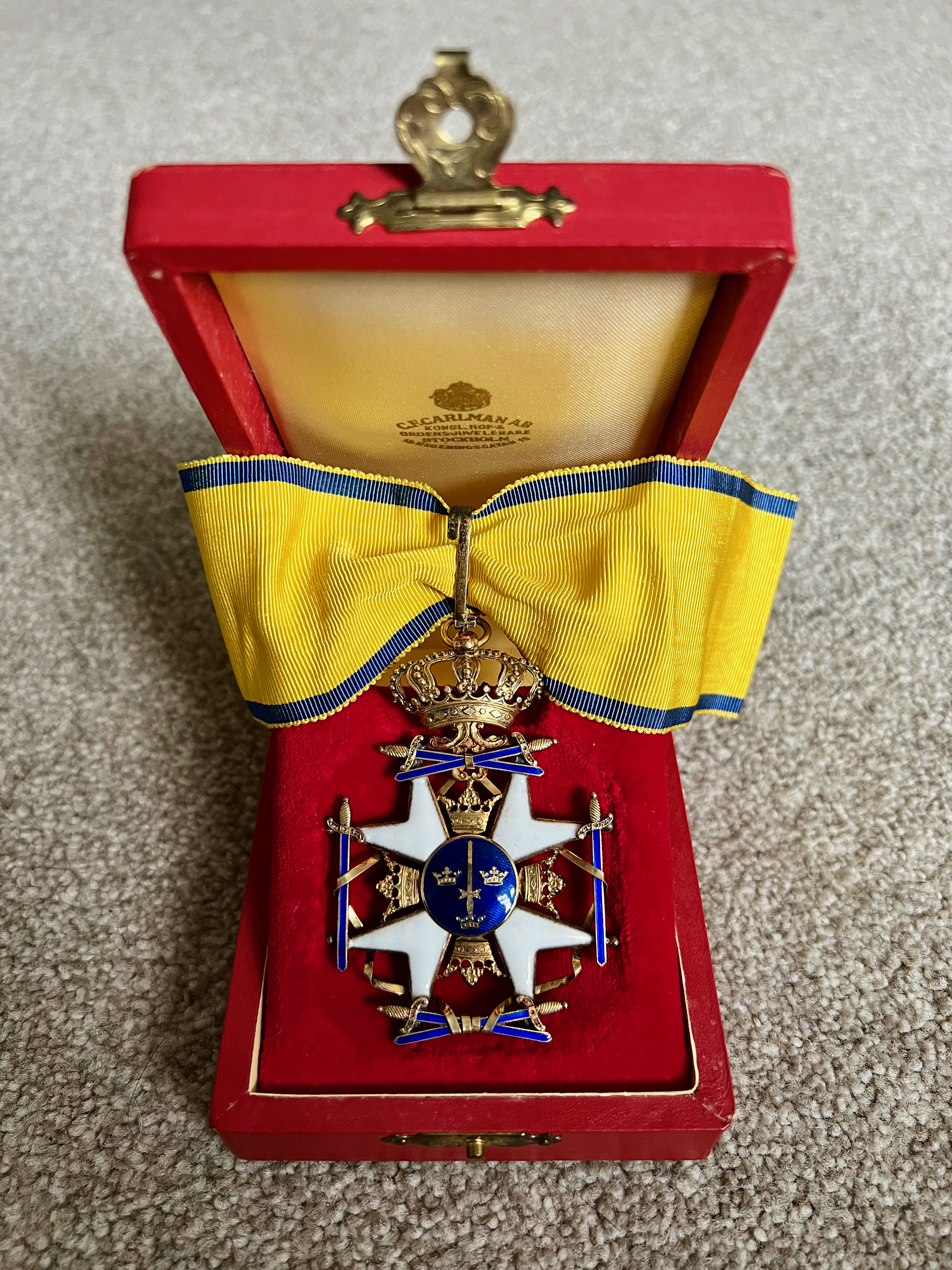
Commander grade set of insignia.

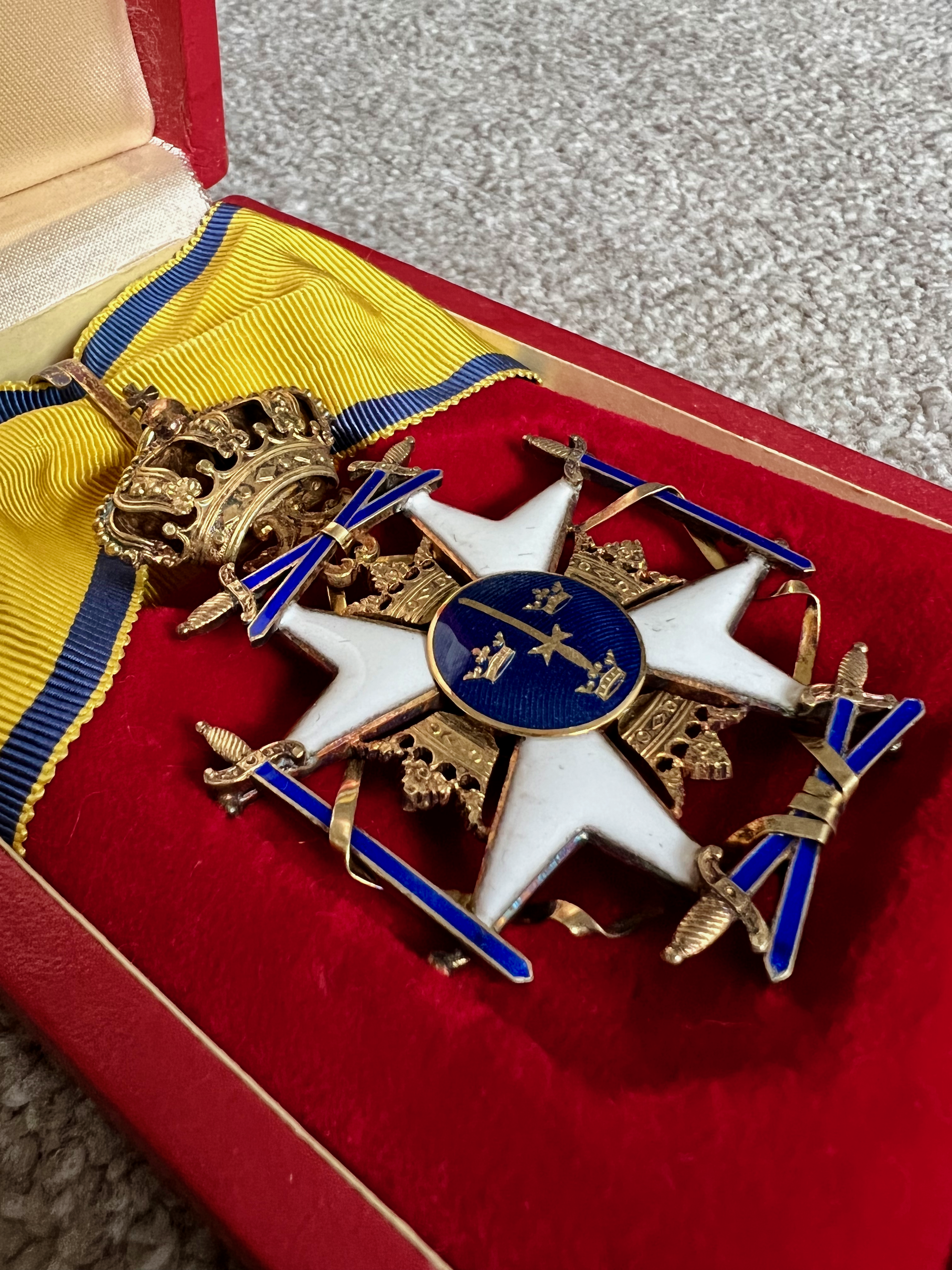
Badge of a Commanders class.

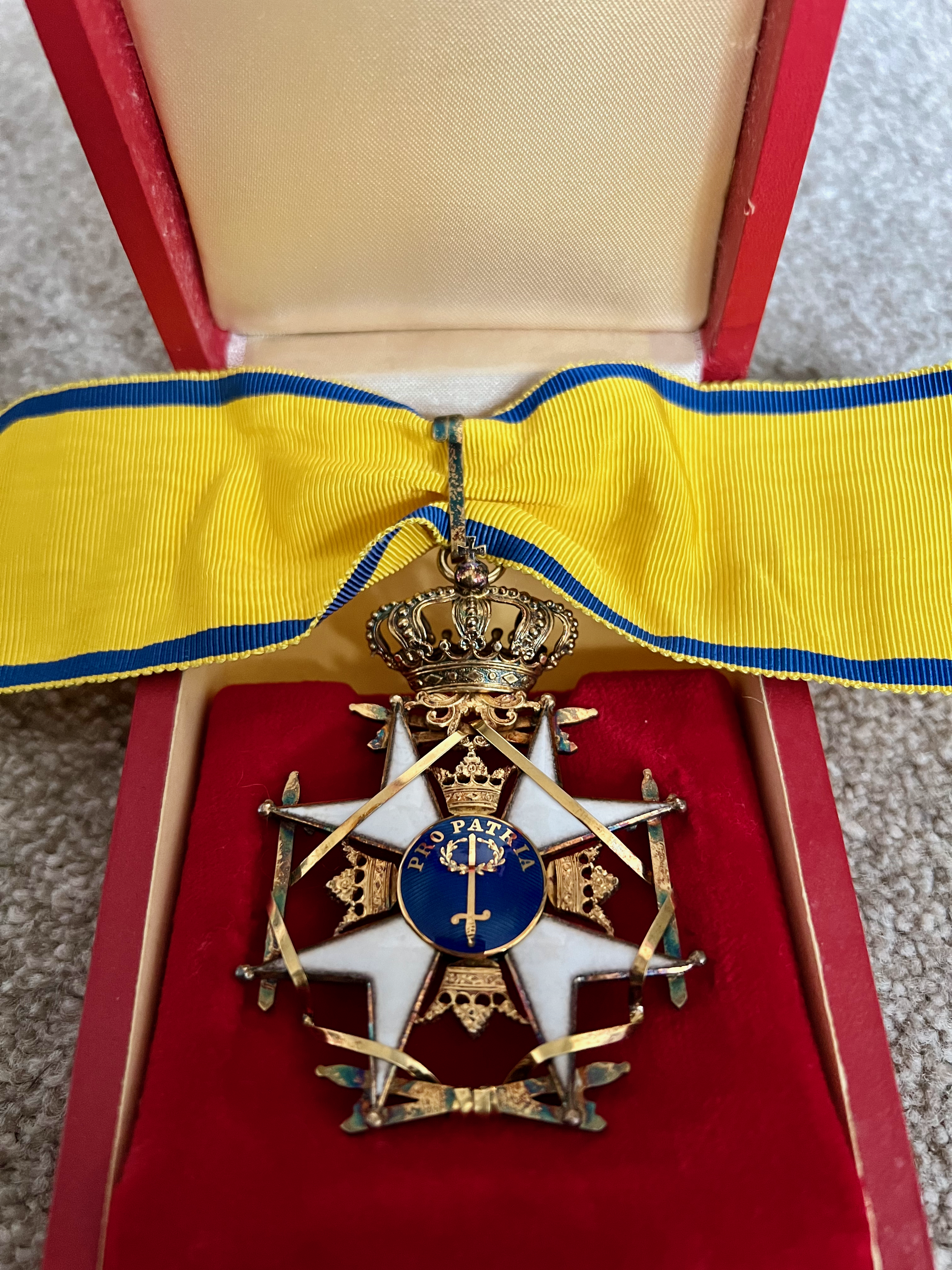
Reverse of Commanders class.

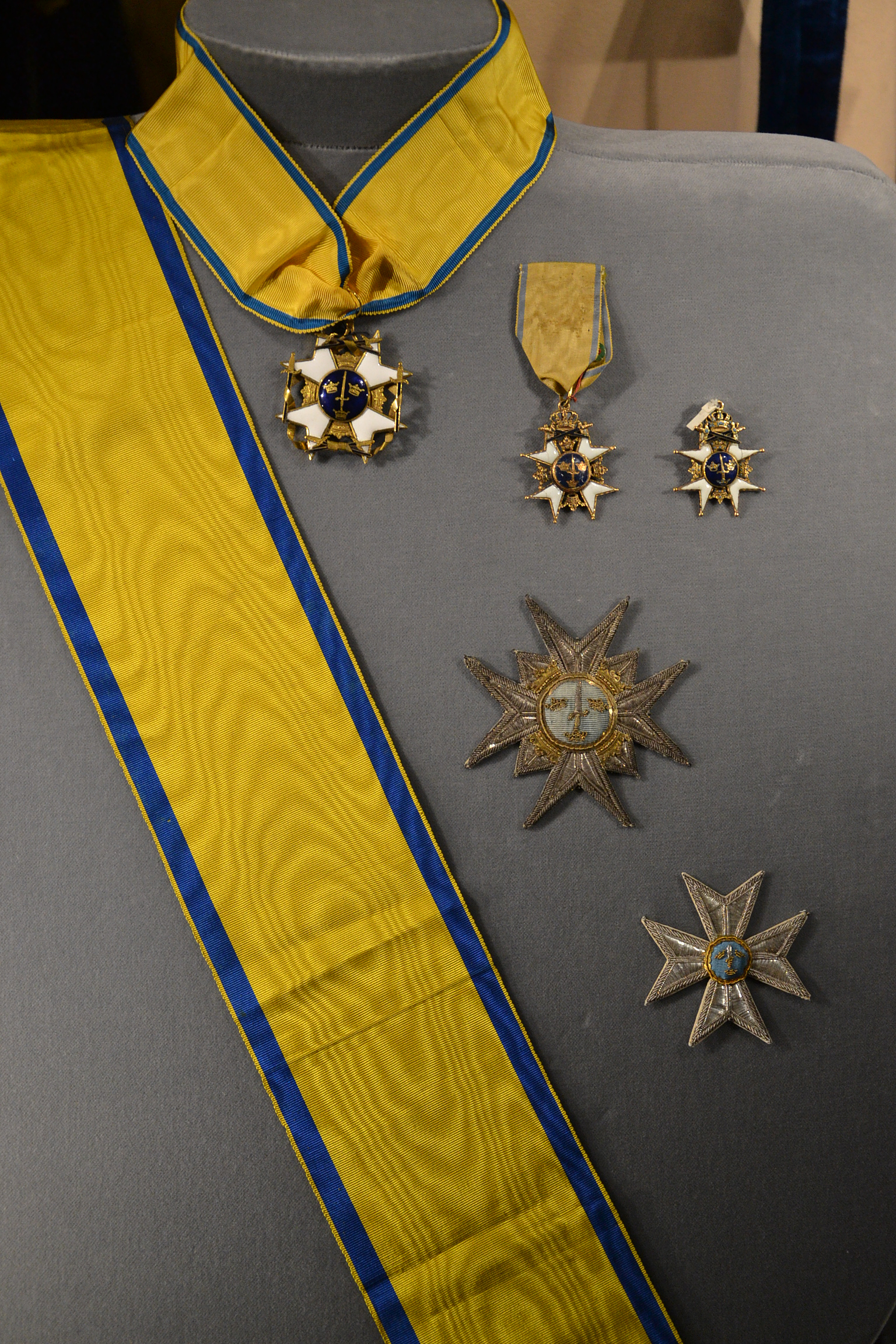
Various grades of the order, on display in the Royal Palace of Stockholm.

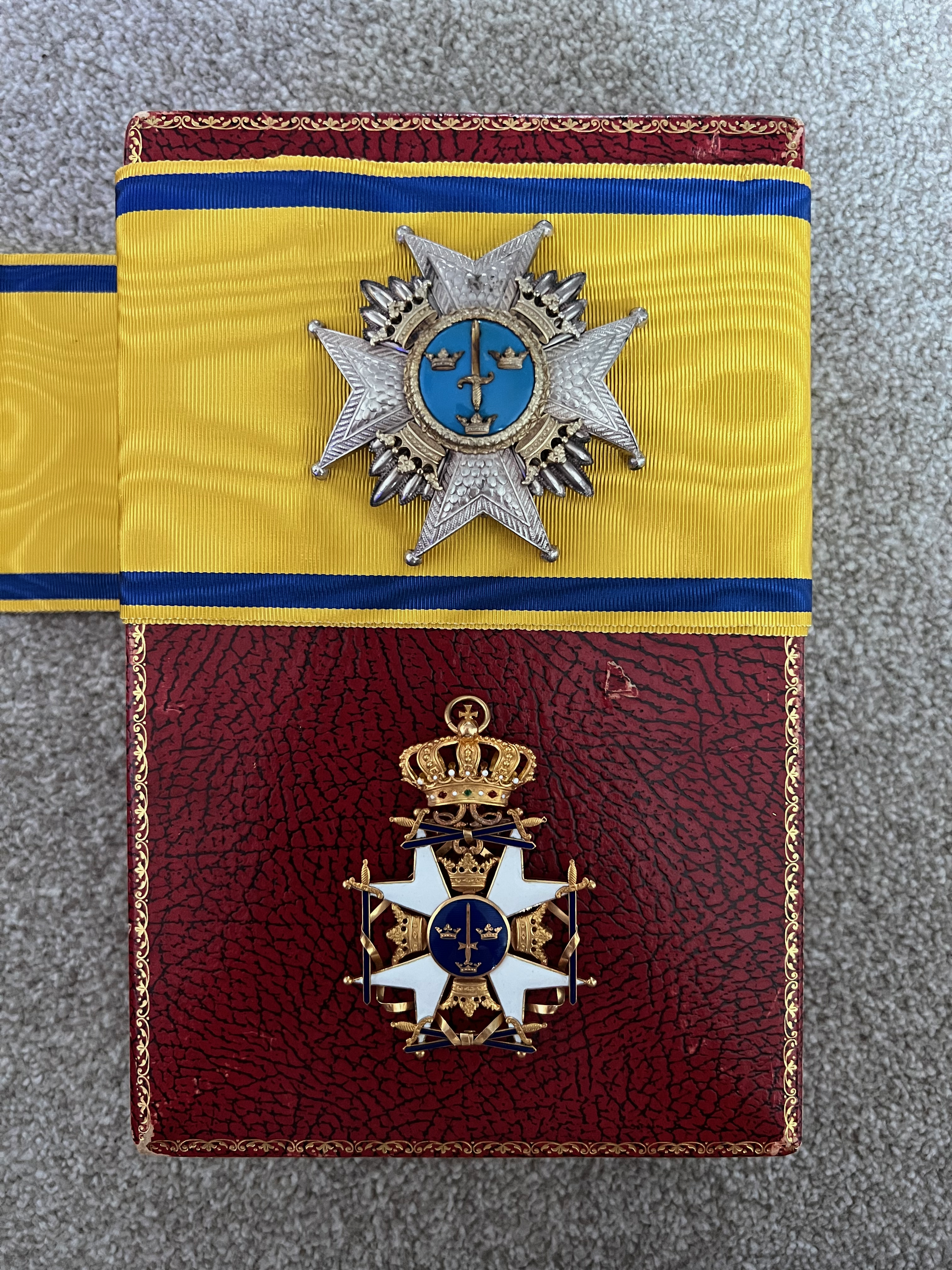
Commander Grand Cross of the order in a case by C.F. Carlman.

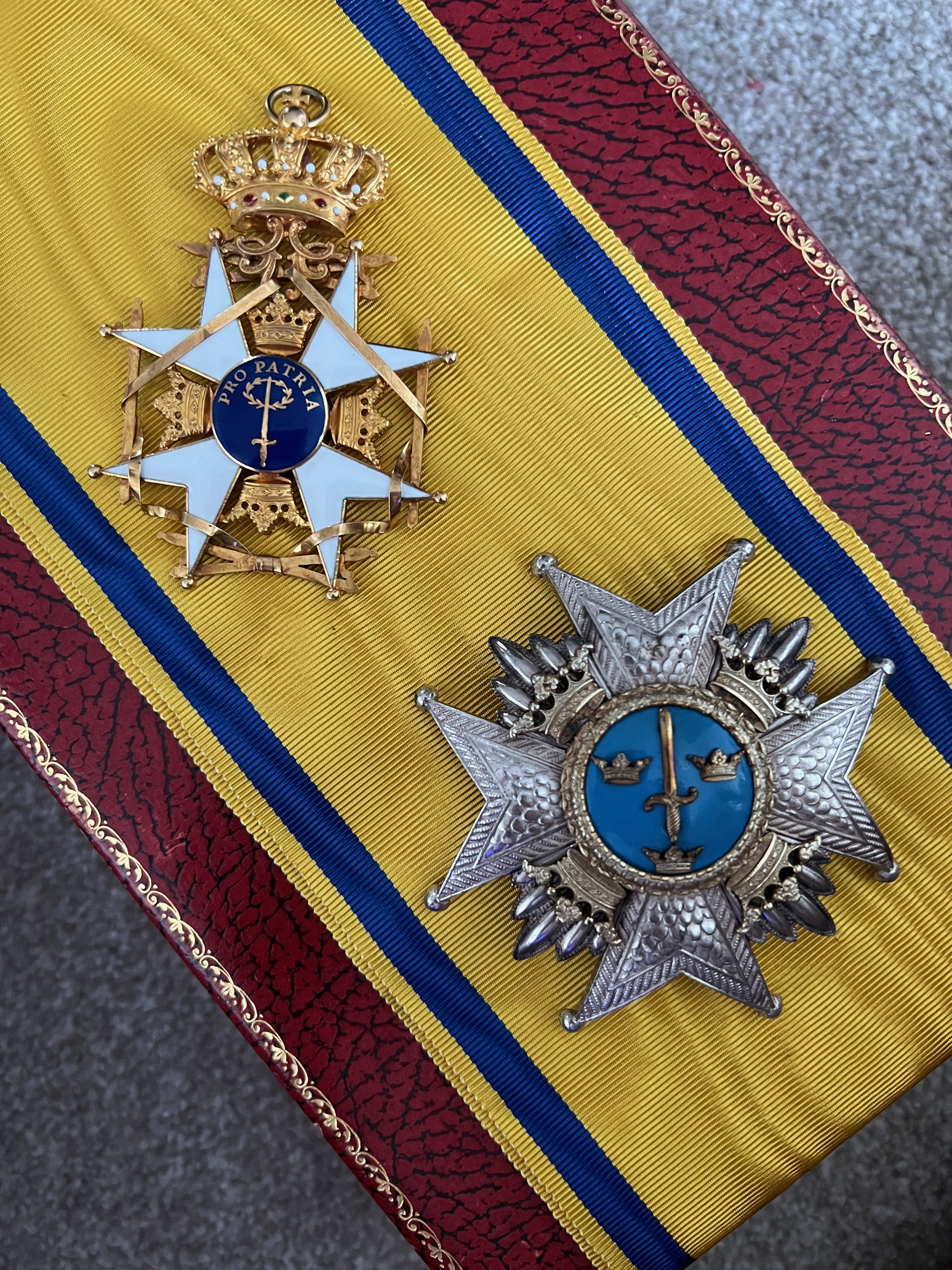
Commander Grand Cross of the order in a case by C.F. Carlman.

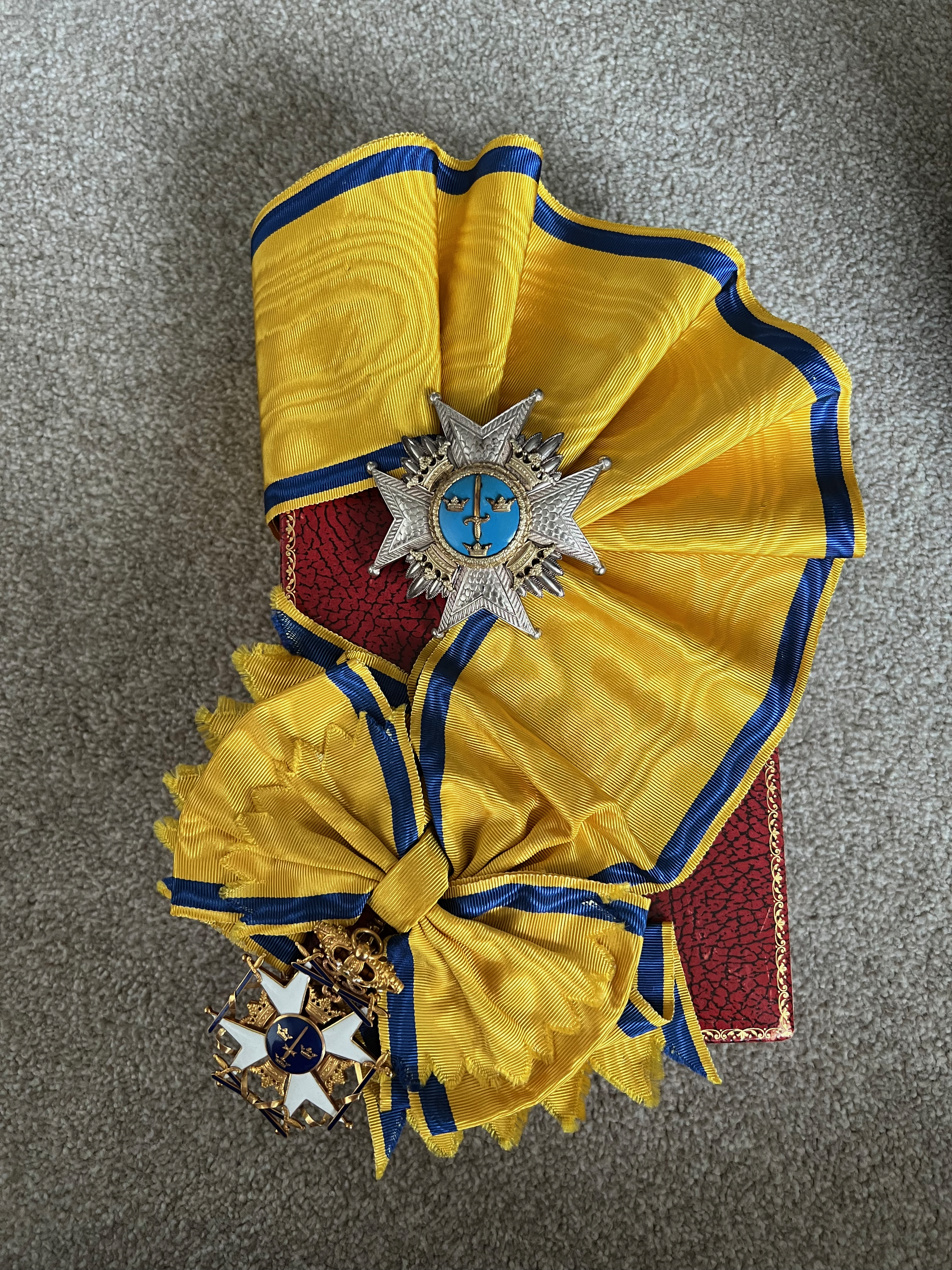
Commander Grand Cross of the order in a case by C.F. Carlman.

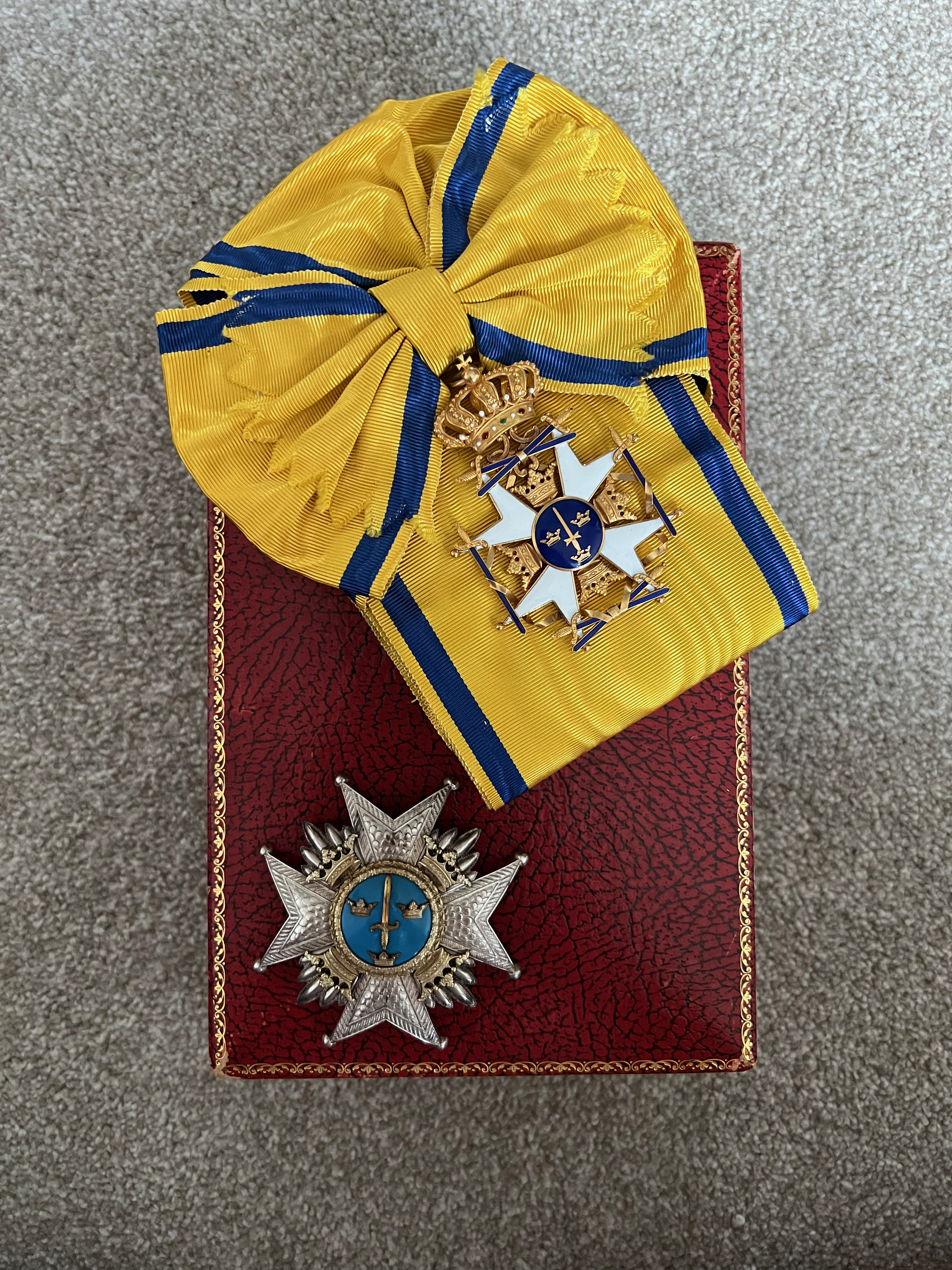
Commander Grand Cross of the order in a case by C.F. Carlman.

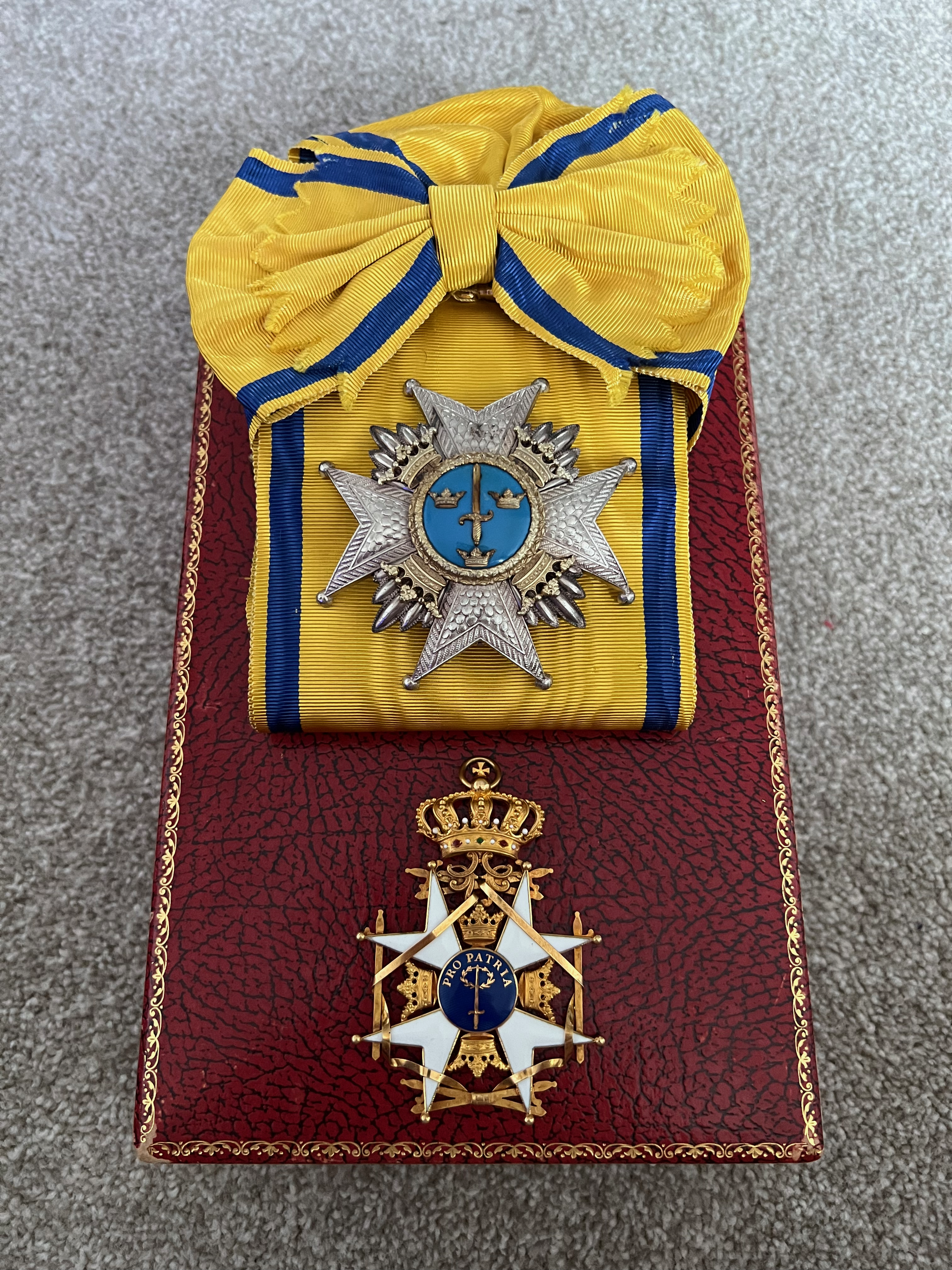
Commander Grand Cross of the order in a case by C.F. Carlman.

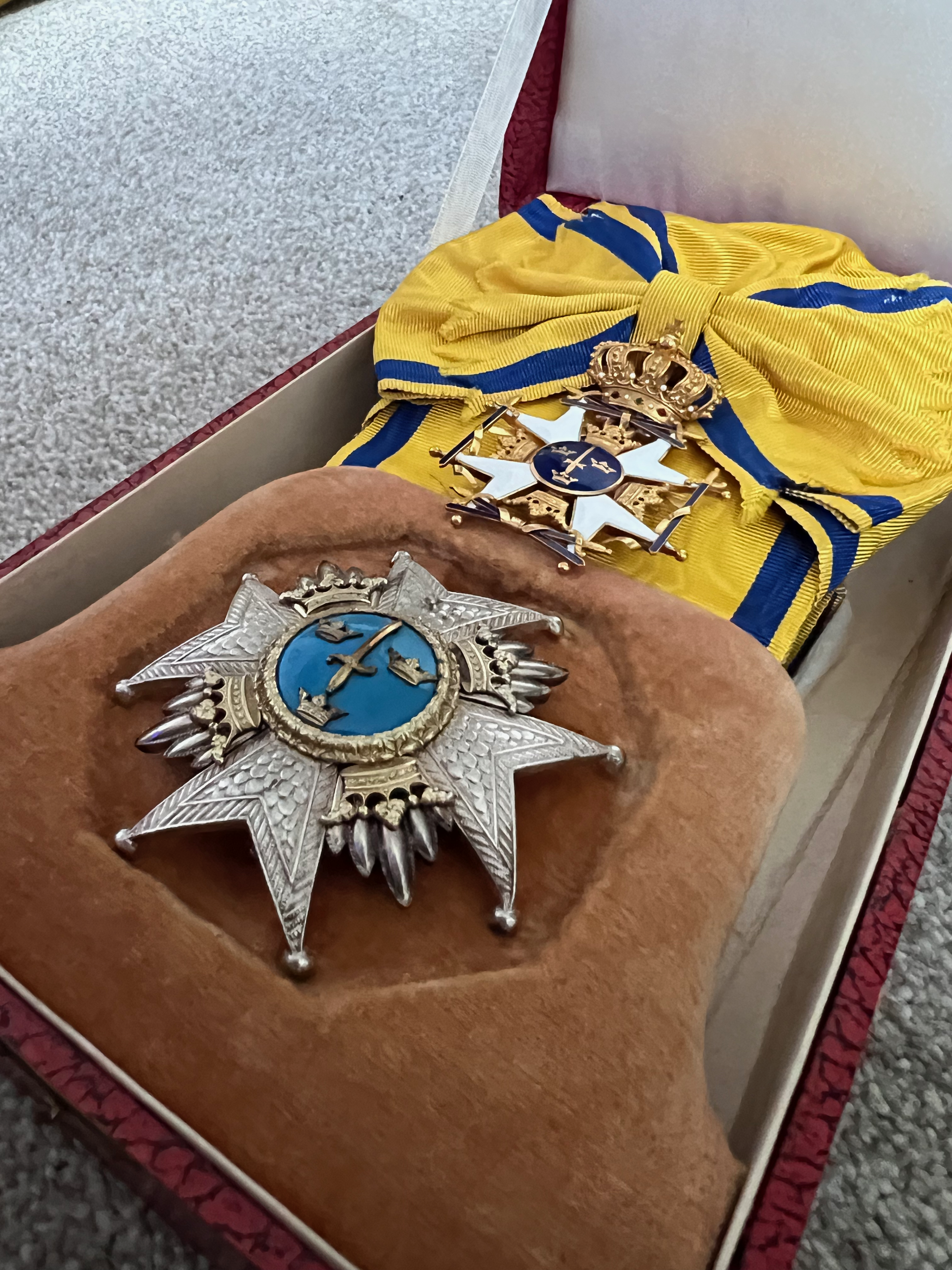
Star of the Commander Grand Cross grade of the order in a case by C.F. Carlman, c.1921

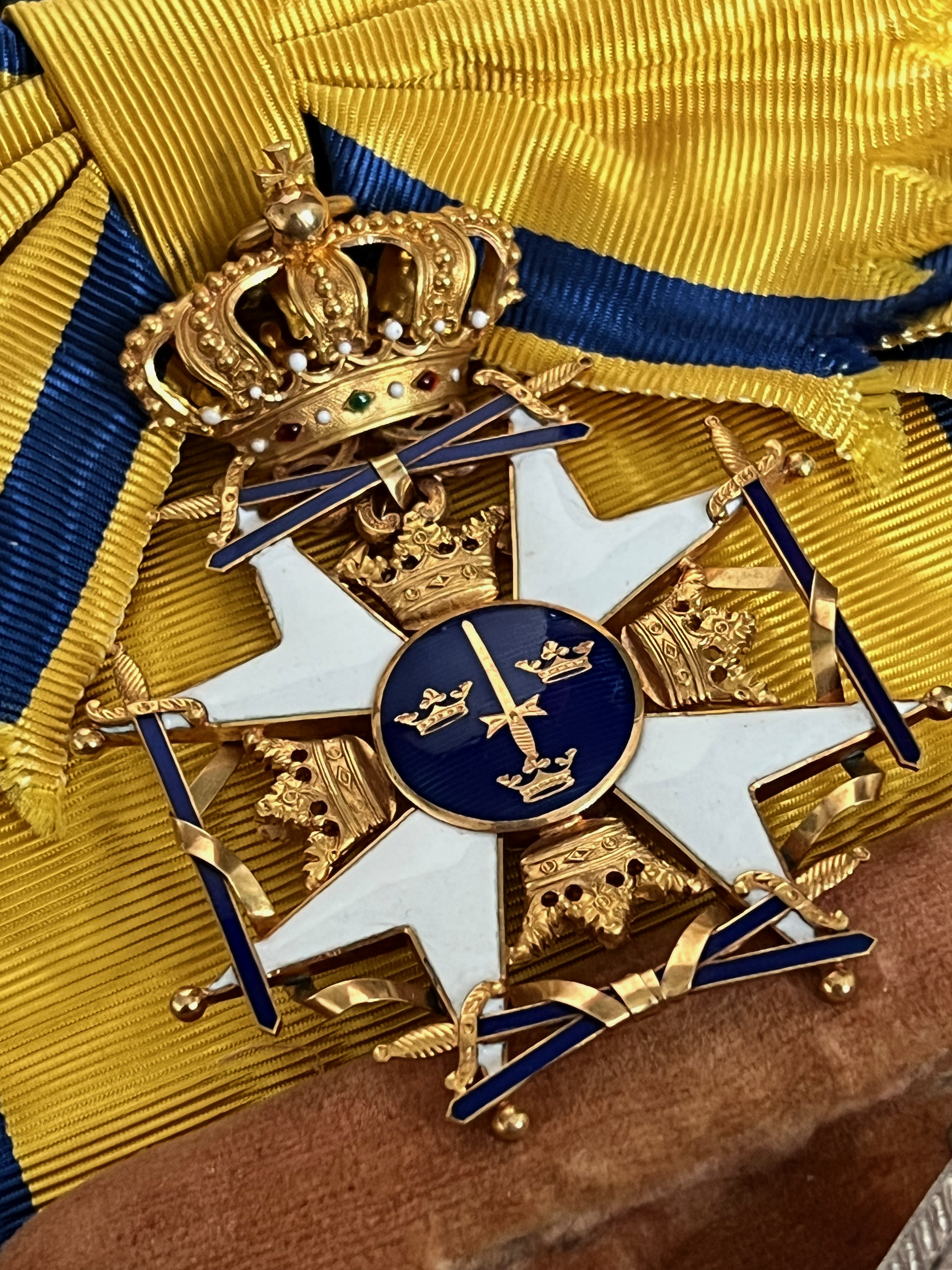
Badge of the Commander Grand Cross of the order in a case by C.F. Carlman, c.1921

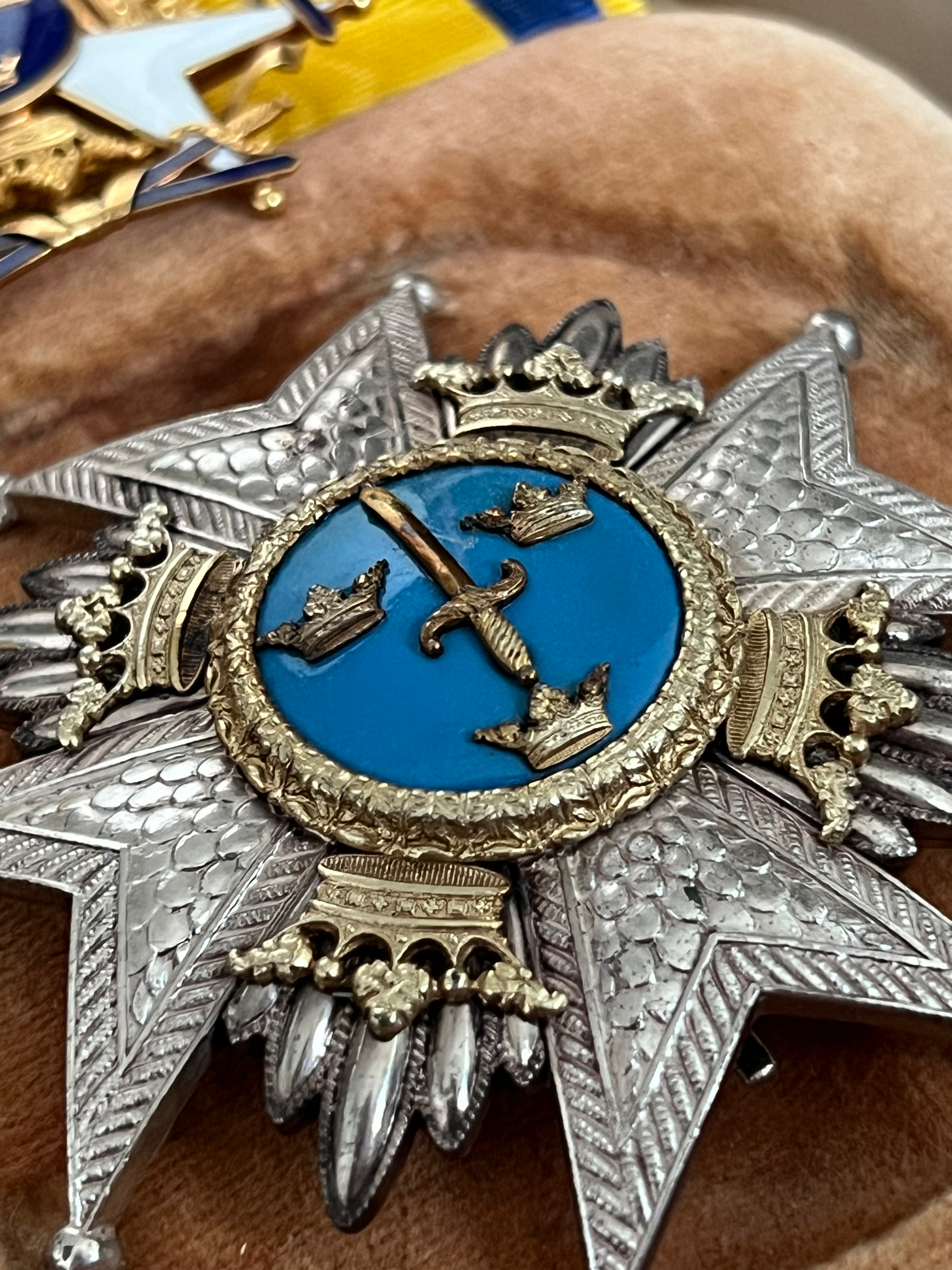
Star of the Commander Grand Cross of the order in a case by C.F. Carlman.

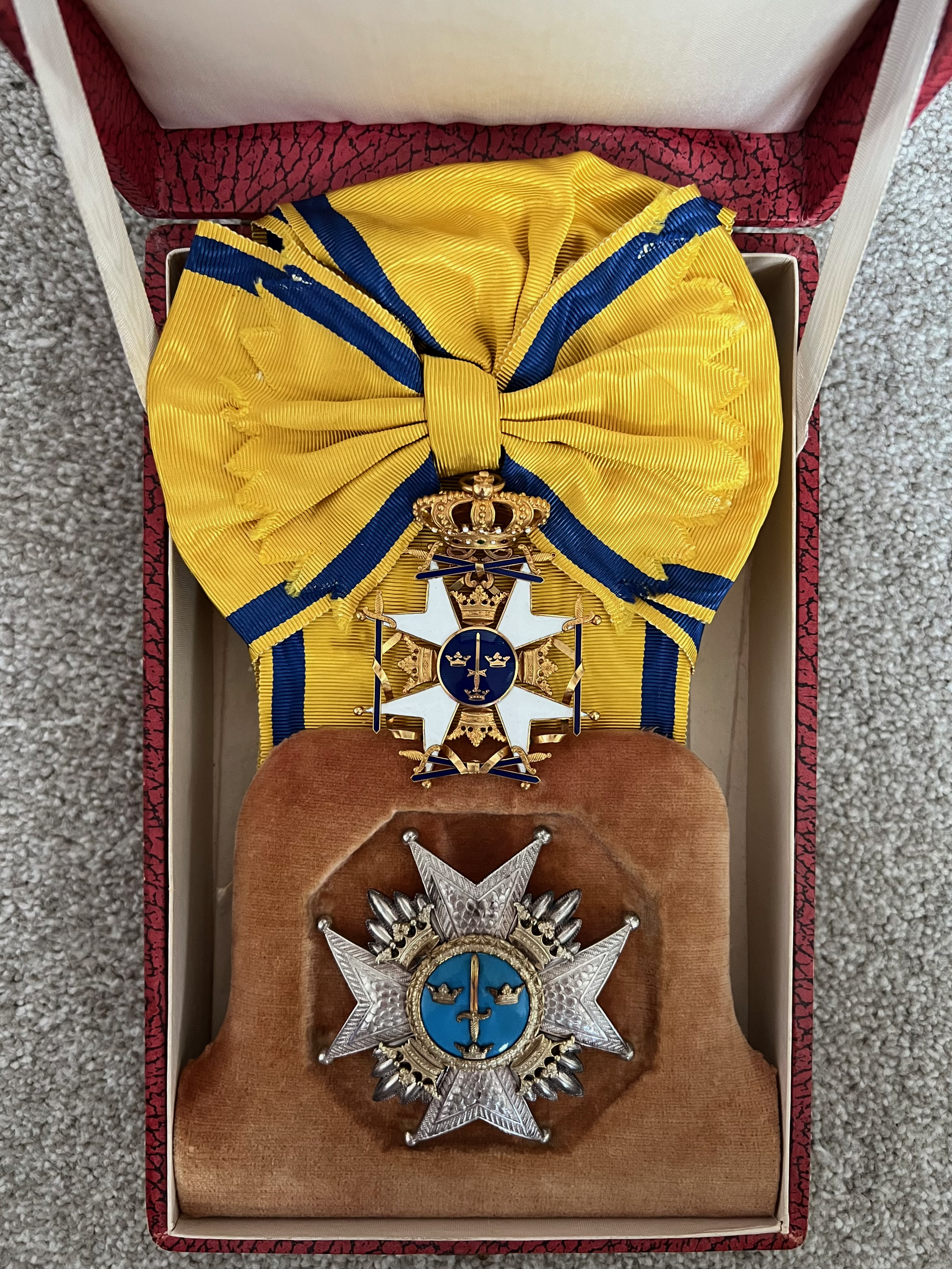
Commander Grand Cross of the order in a case by C.F. Carlman.

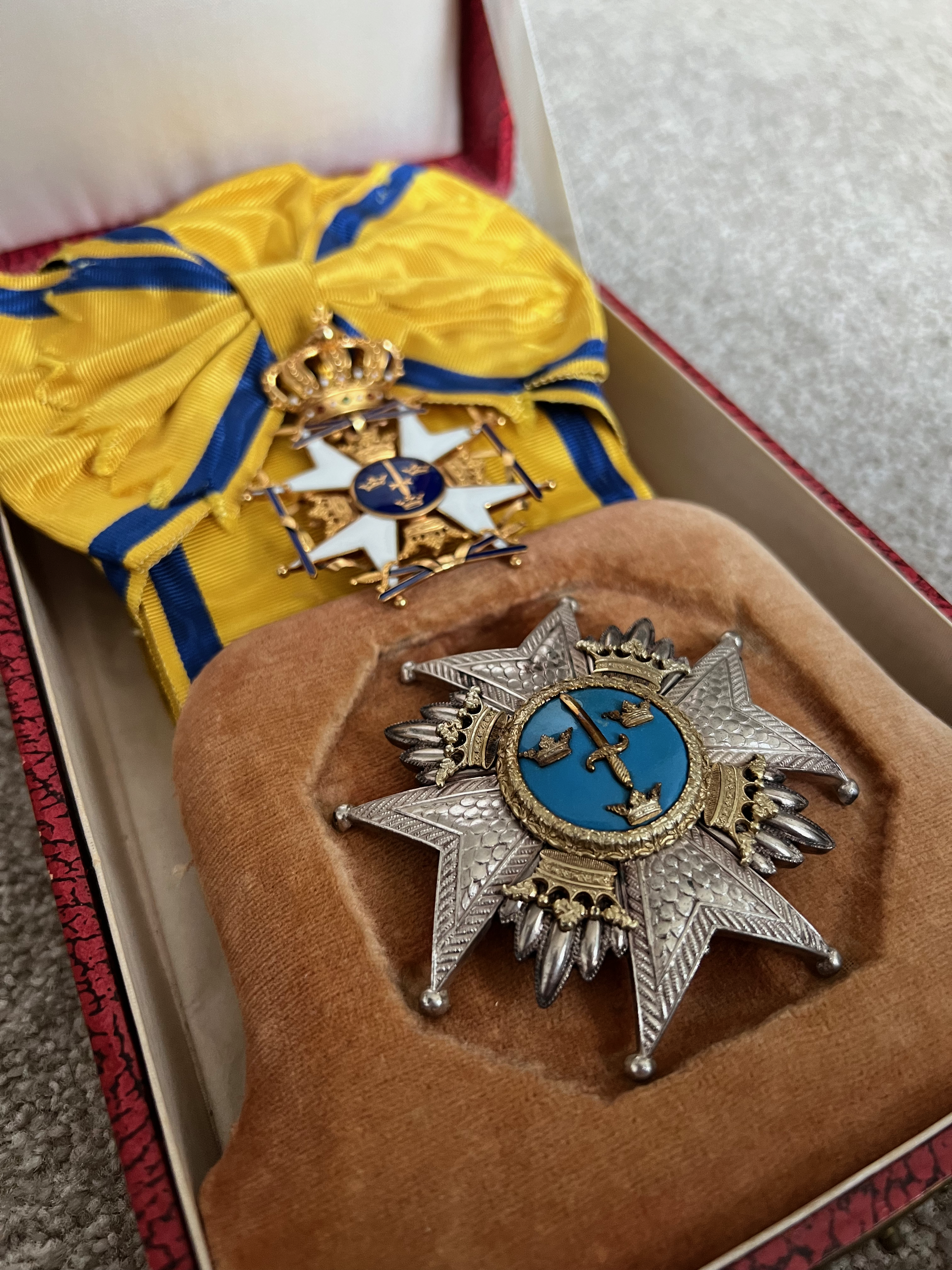
Commander Grand Cross of the order in a case by C.F. Carlman.

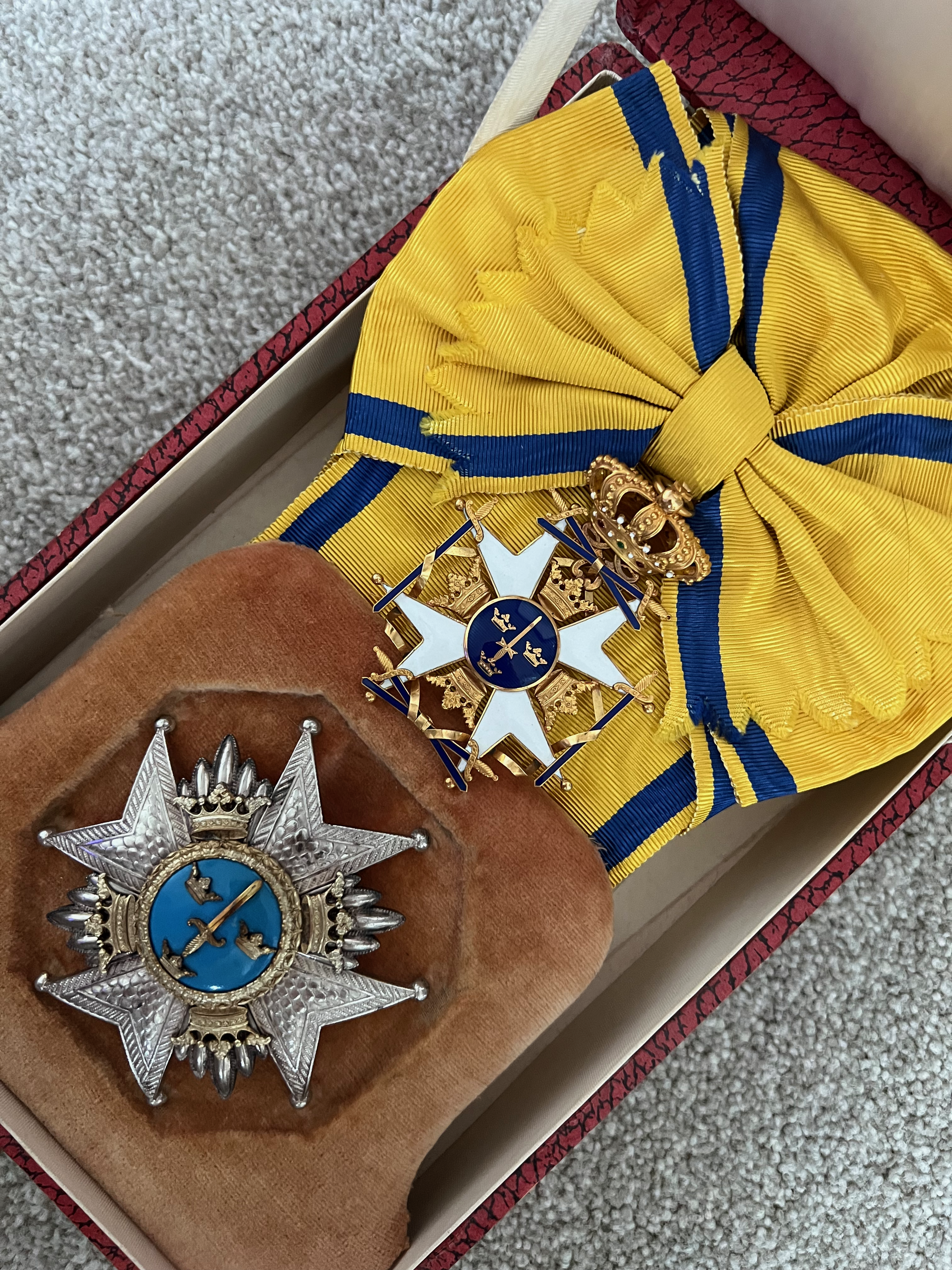
Commander Grand Cross of the order in a case by C.F. Carlman.

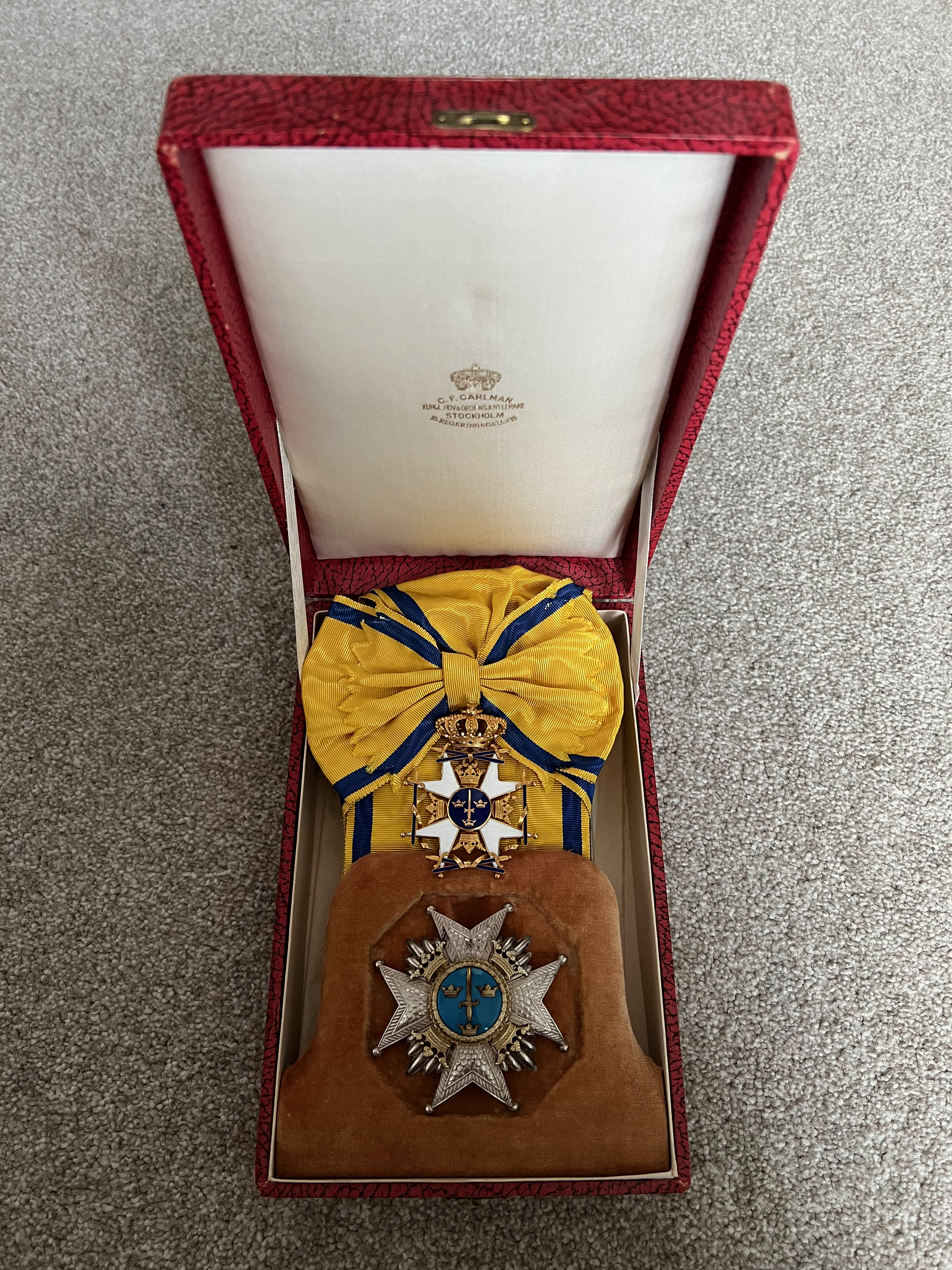
Commander Grand Cross of the order in a case by C.F. Carlman.

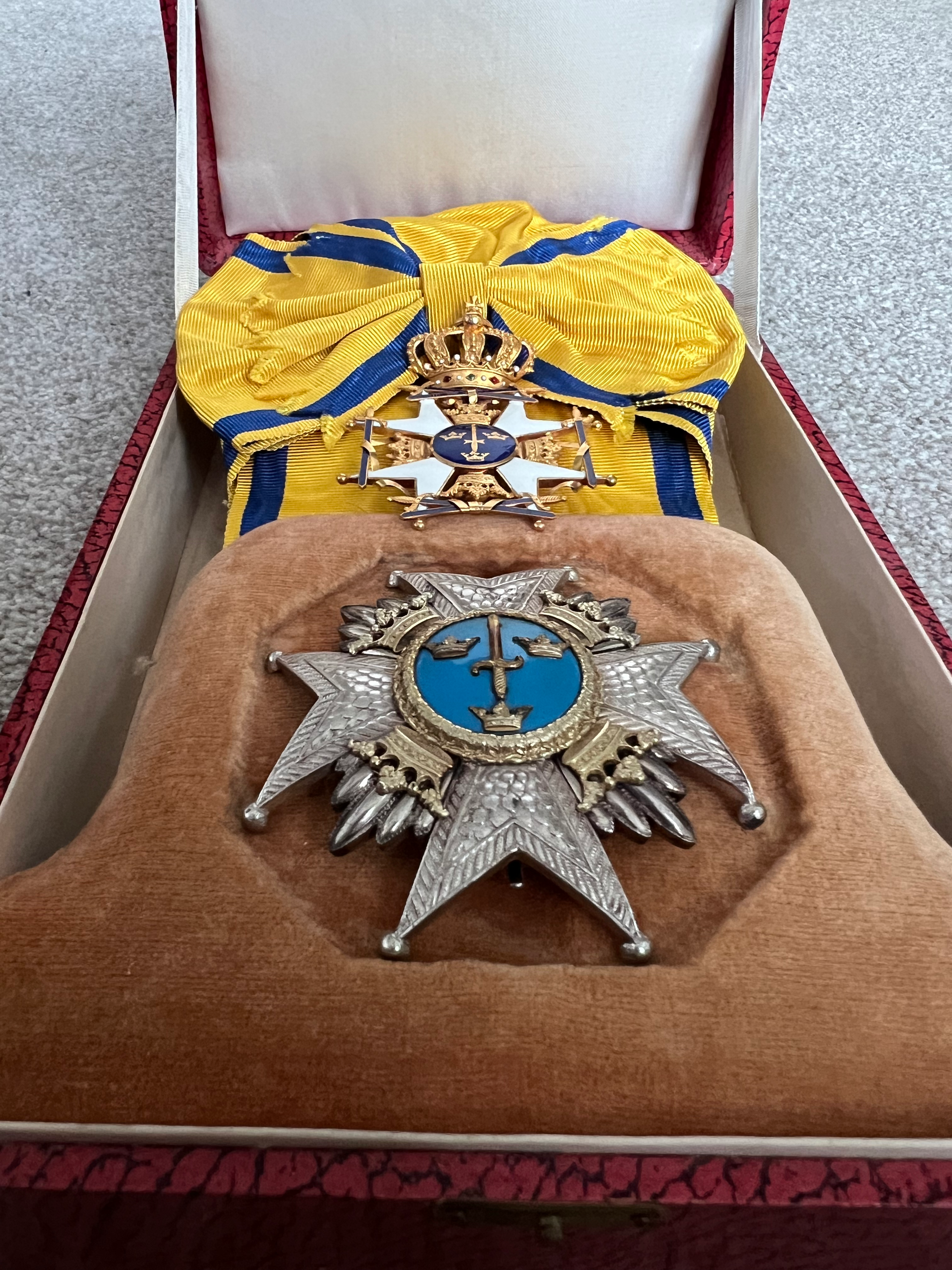
Commander Grand Cross of the order in a case by C.F. Carlman.

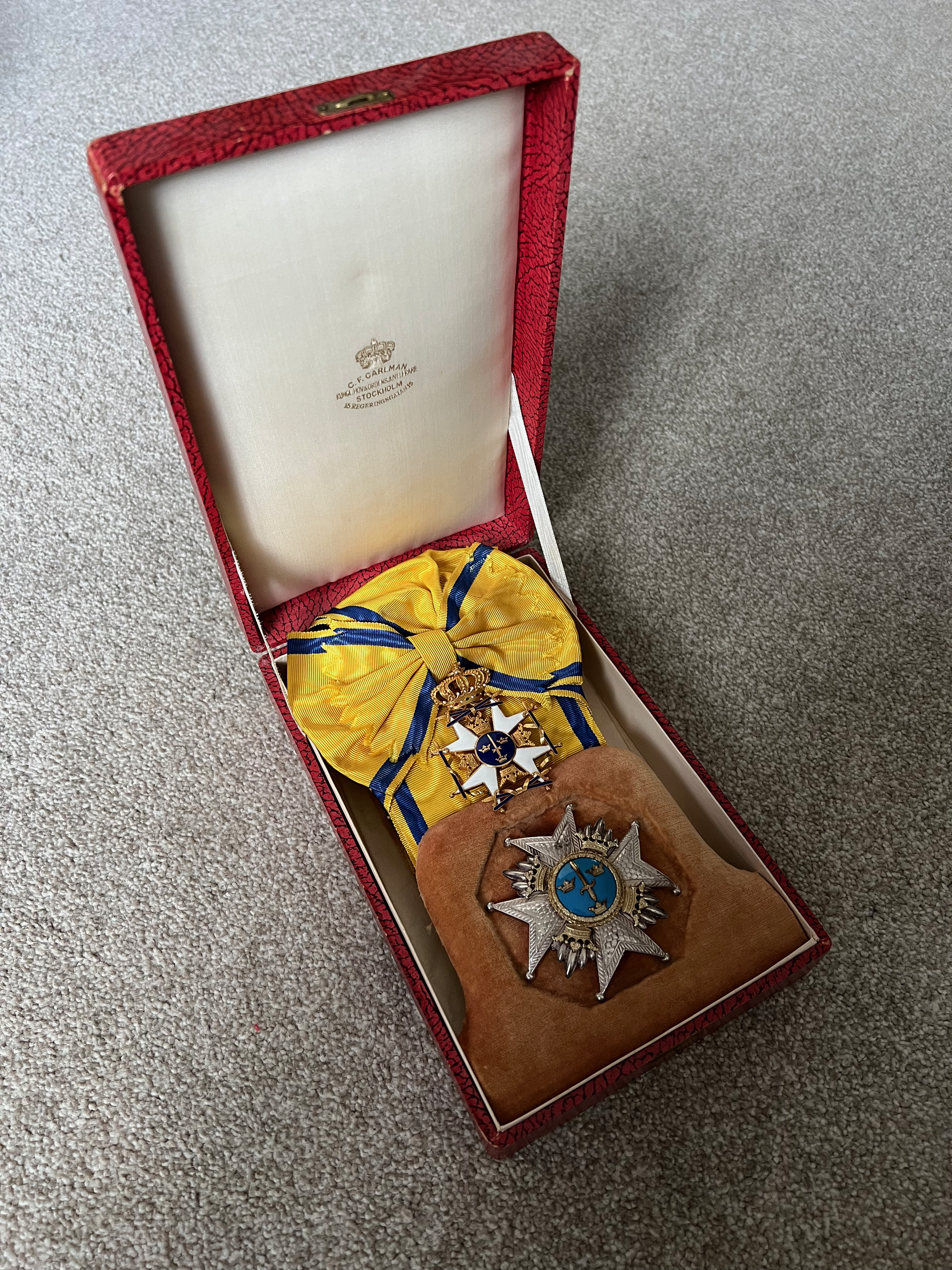
Commander Grand Cross of the order in a case by C.F. Carlman.

== See also ==
- List of recipients of the Order of the Sword (from 2023)
- För tapperhet i fält
- Orders, decorations, and medals of Sweden
