= Ryan S. Sweeney =

United States Air Force Colonel and defence attaché to Sweden

Ryan S. Sweeney KSO
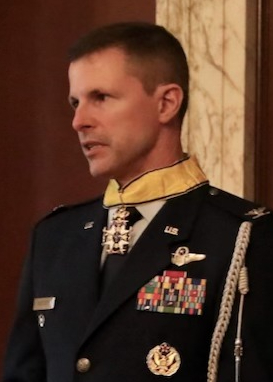
- Colonel Ryan S. Sweeney at his award ceremony, after having received the Swedish Royal Order of the Sword in 2023.
- Born: May 24, 1974 (age 52)
- Military career
- Allegiance: United States of America
- Branch: United States Air Force
- Rank: Colonel
- Awards: Commander of the Swedish Order of the Sword

Ryan Scott Sweeney (born May 24, 1974) is a United States Air Force Colonel and was the defence attaché serving at the United States Embassy in Stockholm from July 2020 - July 2023. He is notable for being the first recipient of the Swedish Royal Order of the Sword since 1974. (Note: Colonel Ryan S. Sweeney is notable as the first recipient of the Swedish Royal Order of the Sword since 1974, when the Swedish Royal Orders of Knighthood were made dormant via a Swedish constitutional reform. However in 2022 the reform was repealed and the Swedish Royal Orders of Knighthood are active once more since January 1, 2023.)

== Honours ==
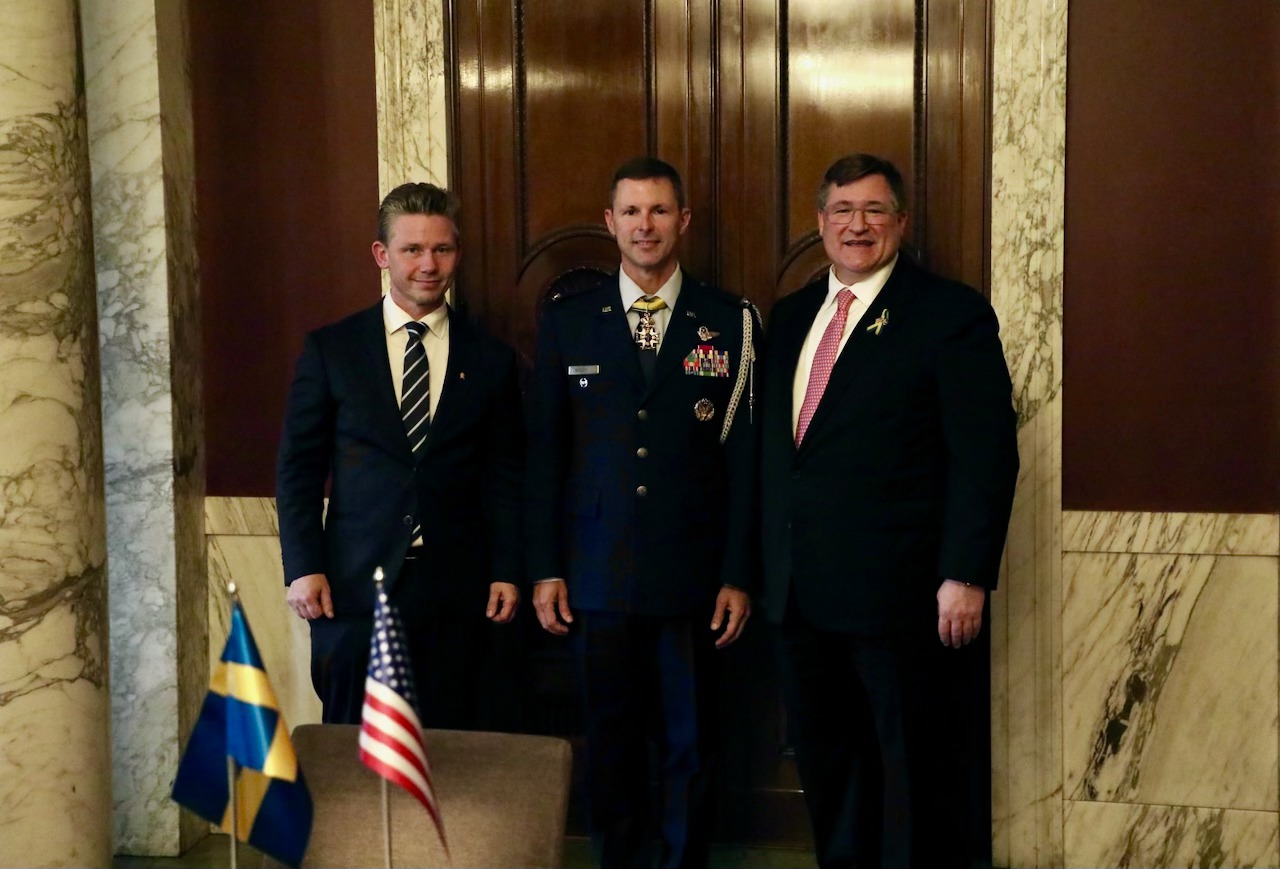
Sweeney (in the middle) together with Sweden's Minister of Defence Pål Jonson and United States Ambassador Erik Ramanathan, 2023.

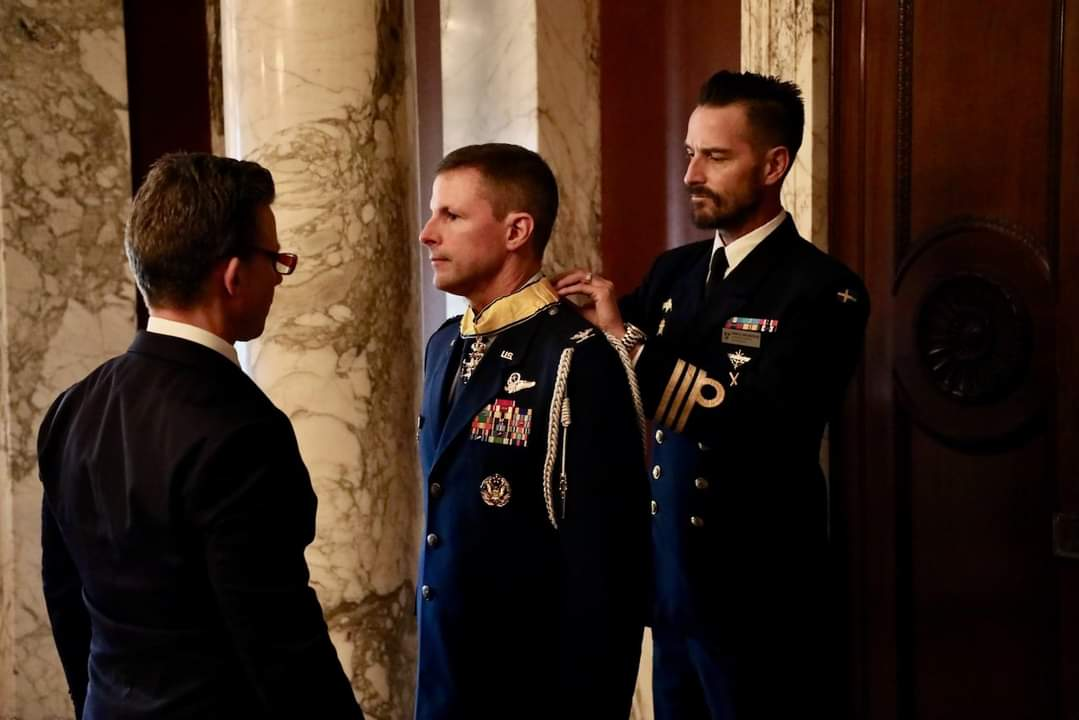
Colonel Ryan S. Sweeney being awarded the Order of the Sword during a ceremony.

Ryan S. Sweeney's personal decorations include:

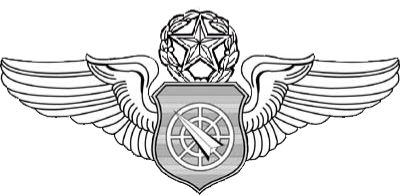

Left breast
Air Battle Managers Wings w/ command skill badge
Legion of Merit
| Defense Meritorious Service Medal | Meritorious Service Medal w/ two bronze oak leaf clusters | Air Medal |
| Aerial Achievement Medal w/ one bronze oak leaf cluster | Air Force Commendation Medal | Air Force Achievement Medal |
| Achievement Medal | Outstanding Unit Award w/ one bronze oak leaf cluster | Combat Readiness Medal w/ one bronze oak leaf cluster |
| National Defense Service Medal | Armed Forces Expeditionary Medal | Global War on Terrorism Expeditionary Medal |
| Global War on Terrorism Service Medal | Nuclear Deterrence Operations Service Medal w/ one bronze oak leaf cluster | Air Force Expeditionary Service Ribbon |
| Air and Space Longevity Service Award w/ one silver oak leaf cluster | Marksmanship Ribbon | Air and Space Training Ribbon |
Headquarters Air Force Badge

=== Foreign honours ===
- (Sweden) Commander of the Royal Order of the Sword, 29 September 2023.
