= Helsingborg =

Second largest city in Scania, Sweden

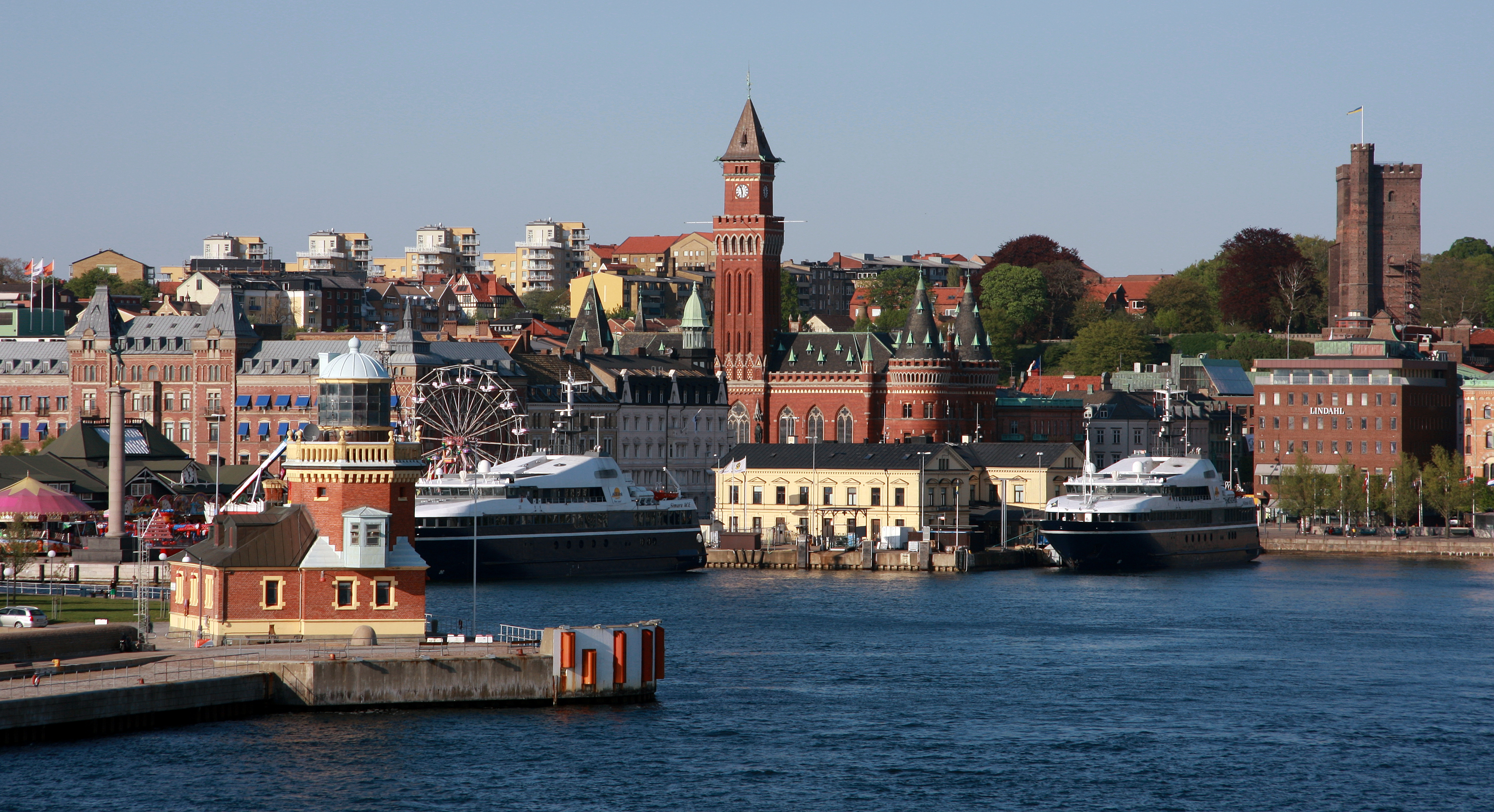
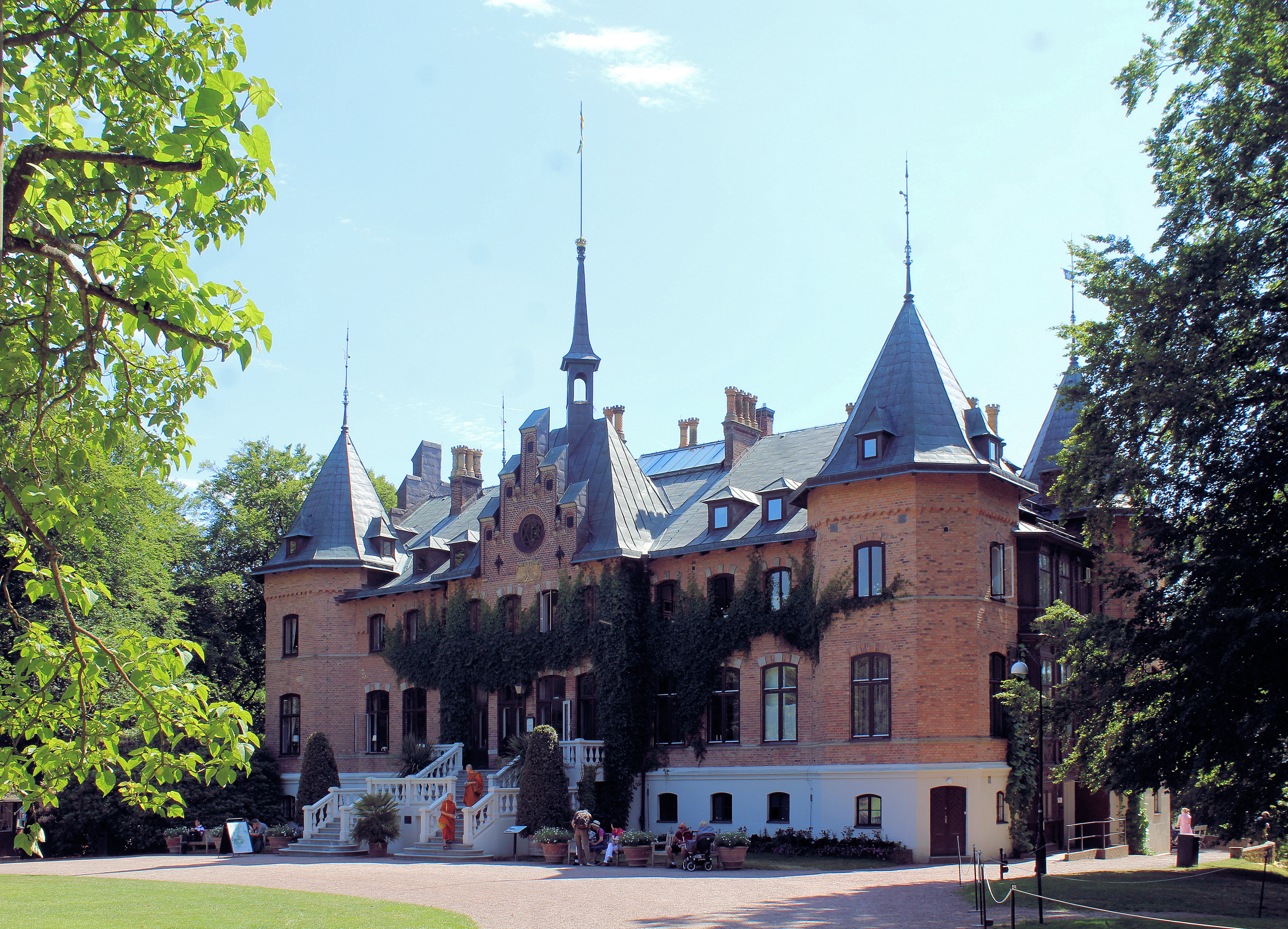
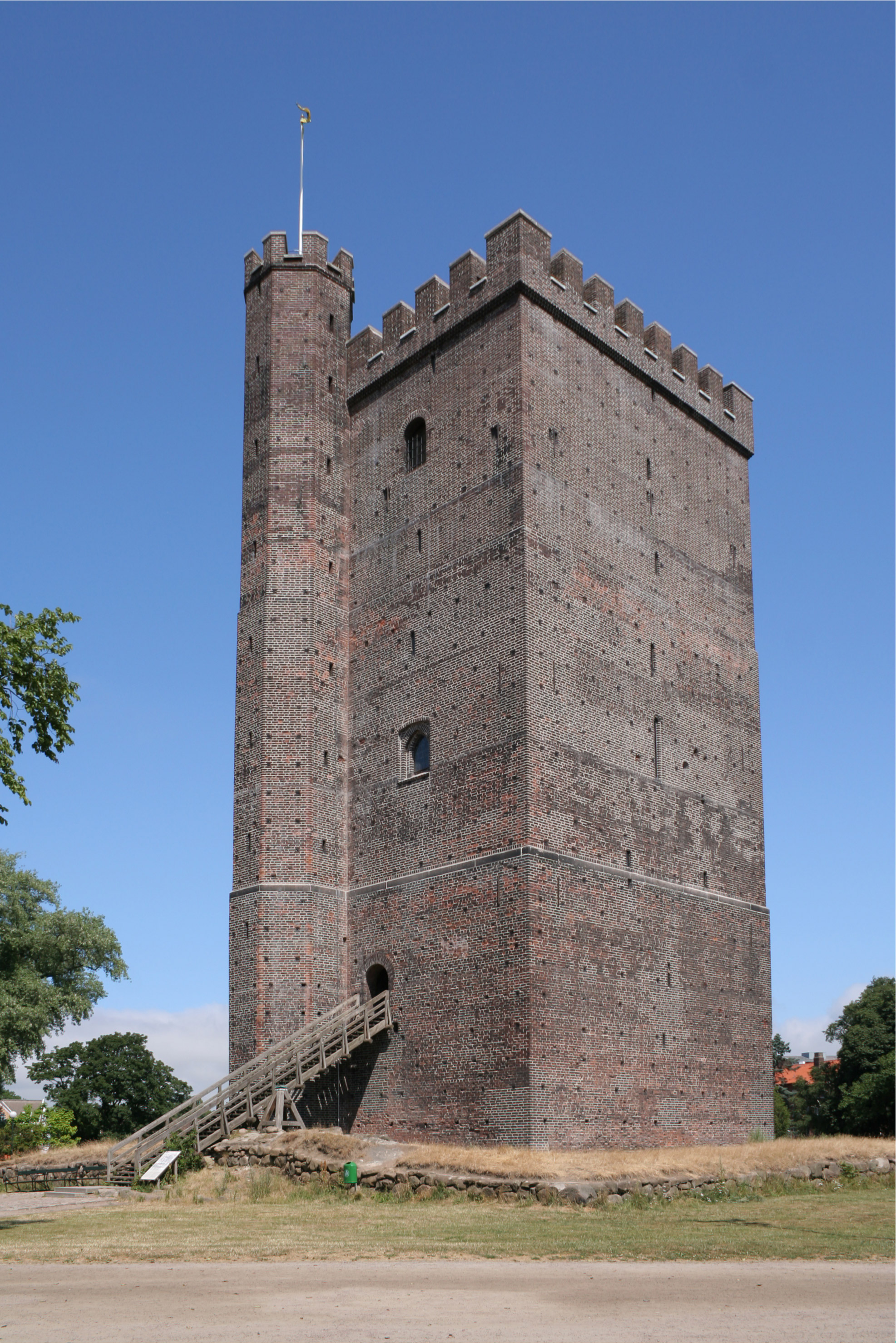
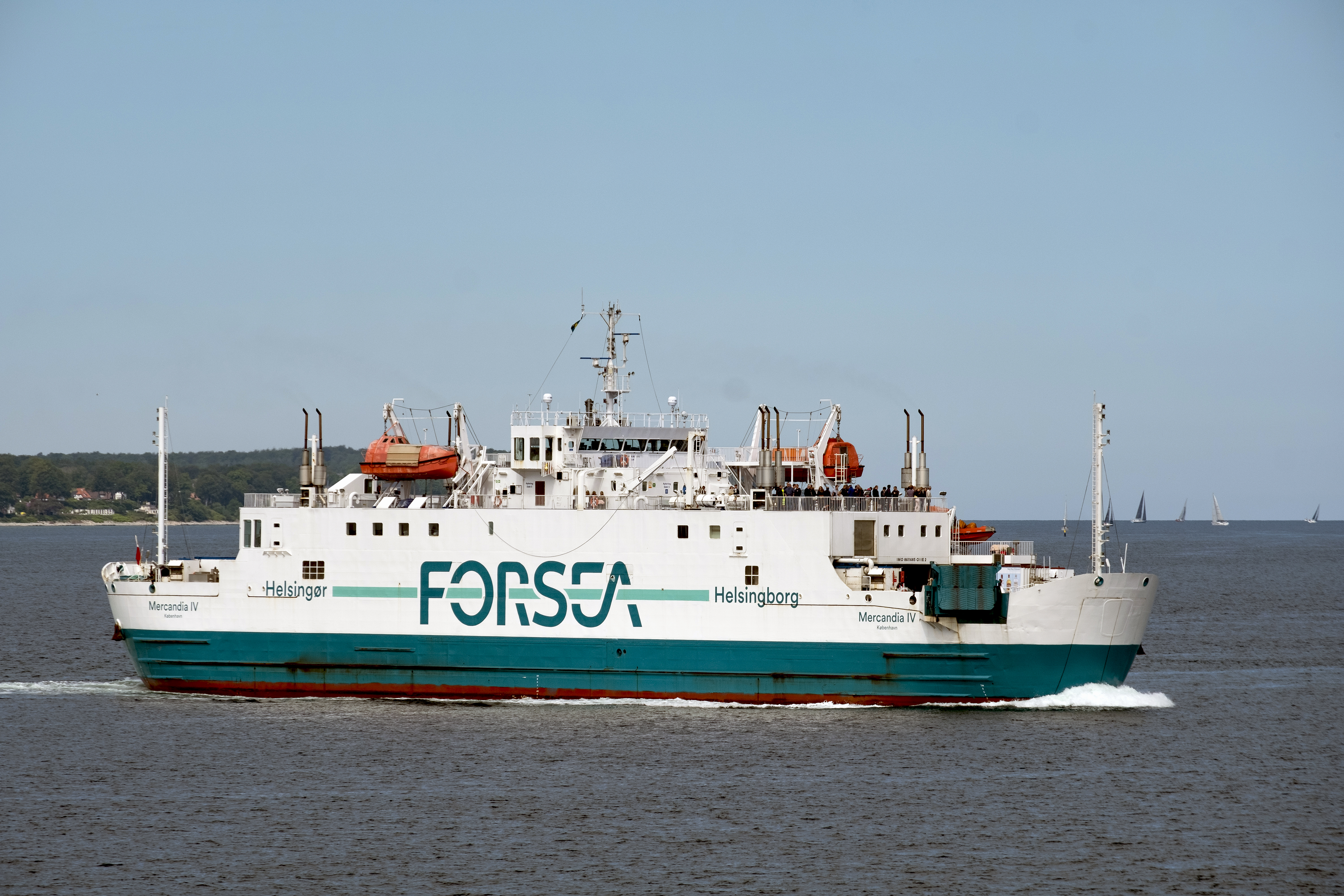
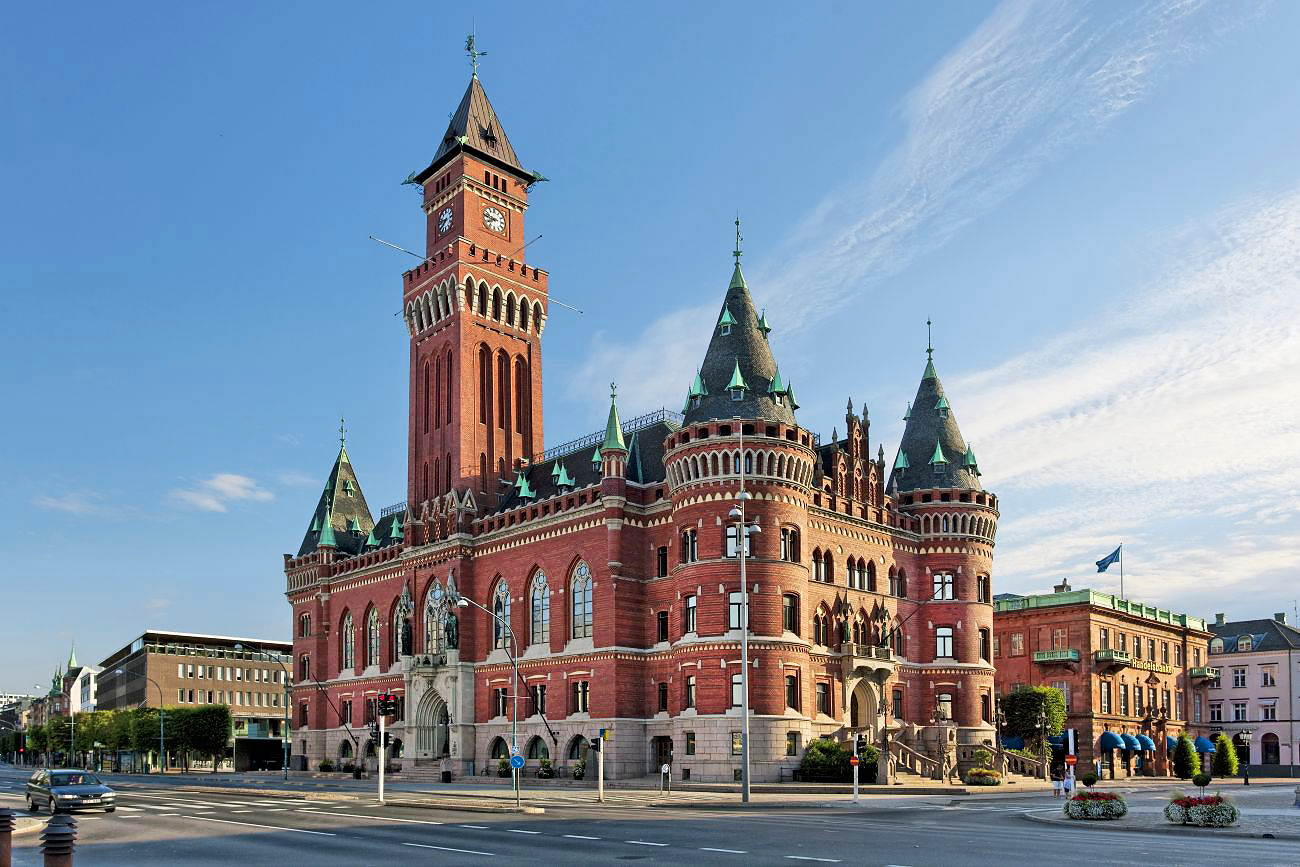
- Helsingborg Harbour Sofiero Kärnan Øresundslinjen Helsingborg City Hall
- Nickname: Pearl of the strait
- Location within Skåne Location within Sweden
- Coordinates: 56°03′N 12°43′E
- Country: Sweden
- Province: Scania
- County: Skåne County
- Municipality: Helsingborg Municipality
- Charter: 1085

Area
  - Total: 38.41 km^{2} (14.83 sq mi)

Population (2020-12-31)
  - Total: 151,404
  - Density: 2,529/km^{2} (6,550/sq mi)
- Time zone: UTC+1 (CET)
  - Summer (DST): UTC+2 (CEST)
- Postal code: 25x xxx
- Area code: (+46) 42
- Website: www.helsingborg.se

Helsingborg (/ˈhɛlsɪŋbɔːrɡ/, US also /-bɔːr(jə), -bɔːri, ˌhɛlsɪŋˈbɔːri/; Swedish: [hɛlsɪŋˈbɔrj]) is a city and the seat of Helsingborg Municipality, Scania (Skåne), Sweden. It is the second-largest city in Scania (after Malmö) and ninth-largest in Sweden, with a population of 151,404 (2024). Helsingborg is the central urban area of northwestern Scania and Sweden's closest point to Denmark: the Danish city Helsingør is clearly visible about 4 km (2.5 mi) to the west on the other side of the Öresund.

Historic Helsingborg, with its many old buildings, is a scenic coastal city. The buildings are a blend of old-style stone-built churches and a 600-year-old medieval fortress (Kärnan) in the city centre, and more modern commercial buildings. The streets vary from wide avenues to small alley-ways. Kullagatan, the main pedestrian shopping street in the city, was the first pedestrian shopping street in Sweden.

== History ==
Helsingborg is one of the oldest cities of what is now Sweden. It has been the site of permanent settlement officially since 21 May 1085. Helsingborg's geographical position at the narrowest part of Øresund made it very important for Denmark, at that time controlling both sides of that strait. From 1429 Eric of Pomerania introduced the Sound Dues, a levy on all trading vessels passing through the sound between Helsingør and Helsingborg. This was one of the main sources of income for the Danish Crown. Crossing traffic, like fishermen, were not subject to the tax, which was initially directed against the Hanseatic League.

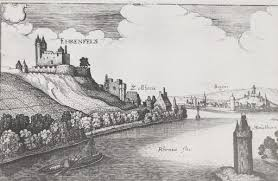

Following the Dano-Swedish War (1657–1658) and the Treaty of Roskilde Denmark had to give up all territory on the southern Scandinavian Peninsula, and Helsingborg became part of Sweden. King Charles X Gustav of Sweden landed here on 5 March 1658 to take personal possession of the Scanian lands and was met by a delegation led by the bishop of the Diocese of Lund, Peder Winstrup. At that time the town had a population of barely 1,000 people.

Its situation on a conflict-ridden border caused problems for Helsingborg. Denmark recaptured Scania twice, but could not hold it. The last Danish attempt to regain Scania was in 1710, when 14,000 men landed on the shores near Helsingborg. The Battle of Helsingborg was fought on 10 March just outside the city, which was badly affected. It took a long time to recover; even in 1770 the city had only 1,321 inhabitants and was still growing slowly.

On 20 October 1811, Jean-Baptiste Bernadotte, Marshal of France and crown prince-elect of Sweden (later King Charles XIV John) took his first step on Swedish soil in Helsingborg on his journey from Paris to Stockholm.

From the middle of the 19th century onwards, Helsingborg was one of the fastest-growing cities of Sweden, increasing its population from 4,000 in 1850 to 20,000 in 1890 and 56,000 in 1930 due to industrialization. From 1892, a train ferry was put in service, connecting Helsingborg with its Danish sister city Helsingør. A tramway network was inaugurated in 1903 and closed down in 1967.

Following the Swedish orthography reform of 1906, the spelling of many place names in Sweden was modernized. In 1912, it was decided to use the form Hälsingborg. In preparation for the local government reform in 1971, Hälsingborg city council proposed that the new, enlarged municipality should be spelled Helsingborg; this form was adopted by the government of Sweden from 1 January 1971.

In World War II, Helsingborg was among the most important drop-off points for the rescue of Denmark's Jewish population during the Holocaust. Adolf Hitler had ordered that all Danish Jews were to be arrested and deported to the concentration camps on Rosh HaShanah, the Jewish New Year which fell on 2 October 1943. When Georg Ferdinand Duckwitz, a German maritime attaché received word of the order on 28 September 1943, he shared it with political and Jewish community leaders. Using the name Elsinore Sewing Club (Danish: Helsingør Syklub) as a cover for messages, the Danish population formed an Underground Railroad of sorts, moving Jews away from the closely watched Copenhagen docks to spots farther away, especially Helsingør, just two miles across the Øresund from Helsingborg. Hundreds of civilians hid their fellow Danish citizens—Jews—in their houses, farm lofts and churches until they could board them onto Danish fishing boats, personal pleasure boats and ferry boats. In the span of three nights, Danes had smuggled over 7200 Jews and 680 non-Jews (gentile family members of Jews or political activists) across the Øresund, to safety in Sweden, with one of the main destinations at Helsingborg.

== Climate ==
Helsingborg has an oceanic climate (Cfb) typical of southern Sweden, and its winters are mild for a location at such a high latitude. Although the temperature differences between seasons are significant, Helsingborg rarely experience very cold winters, with both January and February averaging just above the freezing point in terms of mean temperatures. Summers can be warm and comparatively long by Swedish standards, with summer arriving earlier and fall later than virtually all areas of Sweden, aside from other parts of Skåne. Helsingborg and nearby surroundings also have a history with being hit by tornadoes. On 8 August 1947, a High-end F1/T3 Tornado hit the Ramlösa district of Helsingborg, causing moderate damage to a farm. Greenhouses were damaged or destroyed, a stall sustained deroofing, a shed was blown away and a tree was snapped. On 16 August 2007, downtown Helsingborg was impacted by an F1 Tornado, damaging a school and snapping trees. On 22 June 2014, a Waterspout was observed outside Helsingborg. On 27 August 2018, the Eskilsminne district of Helsingborg was hit by an F0 Tornado. Some roofs sustained minor damage.

Climate data for Helsingborg (2002–2022 averages), extremes since 1948
Month	Jan	Feb	Mar	Apr	May	Jun	Jul	Aug	Sep	Oct	Nov	Dec	Year
Record high °C (°F)	11.0 (51.8)	15.3 (59.5)	18.0 (64.4)	26.0 (78.8)	28.1 (82.6)	33.4 (92.1)	33.2 (91.8)	32.4 (90.3)	31.1 (88.0)	22.5 (72.5)	16.6 (61.9)	12.0 (53.6)	33.2 (91.8)
Mean maximum °C (°F)	8.0 (46.4)	8.6 (47.5)	14.0 (57.2)	19.3 (66.7)	24.7 (76.5)	27.5 (81.5)	29.4 (84.9)	28.4 (83.1)	23.7 (74.7)	17.5 (63.5)	12.5 (54.5)	9.0 (48.2)	30.1 (86.2)
Mean daily maximum °C (°F)	3.0 (37.4)	3.3 (37.9)	6.9 (44.4)	12.5 (54.5)	17.1 (62.8)	20.7 (69.3)	22.8 (73.0)	22.3 (72.1)	18.3 (64.9)	12.6 (54.7)	7.9 (46.2)	4.4 (39.9)	12.7 (54.8)
Daily mean °C (°F)	0.8 (33.4)	0.5 (32.9)	3.4 (38.1)	7.9 (46.2)	13.3 (55.9)	16.0 (60.8)	18.1 (64.6)	17.7 (63.9)	14.4 (57.9)	9.6 (49.3)	5.8 (42.4)	2.4 (36.3)	9.2 (48.5)
Mean daily minimum °C (°F)	−1.4 (29.5)	−1.3 (29.7)	−0.1 (31.8)	3.2 (37.8)	7.5 (45.5)	11.2 (52.2)	13.4 (56.1)	13.4 (56.1)	10.5 (50.9)	6.5 (43.7)	3.6 (38.5)	0.4 (32.7)	5.6 (42.0)
Mean minimum °C (°F)	−10.3 (13.5)	−8.9 (16.0)	−6.9 (19.6)	−2.8 (27.0)	1.1 (34.0)	6.1 (43.0)	9.0 (48.2)	8.1 (46.6)	4.2 (39.6)	−1.2 (29.8)	−4.6 (23.7)	−7.6 (18.3)	−12.8 (9.0)
Record low °C (°F)	−21.7 (−7.1)	−20.5 (−4.9)	−18.8 (−1.8)	−8.7 (16.3)	−1.5 (29.3)	3.0 (37.4)	4.4 (39.9)	5.4 (41.7)	−0.1 (31.8)	−7.3 (18.9)	−10.3 (13.5)	−22.0 (−7.6)	−22.0 (−7.6)
Average precipitation mm (inches)	52.1 (2.05)	43.8 (1.72)	37.0 (1.46)	27.5 (1.08)	49.5 (1.95)	67.2 (2.65)	72.0 (2.83)	87.0 (3.43)	51.2 (2.02)	69.8 (2.75)	55.3 (2.18)	60.5 (2.38)	672.9 (26.5)
Source 1: SMHI Open Data
Source 2: SMHI Monthly Data 2002–2022

== Demographics ==
113,816 live in the city of Helsingborg as of 2020, up from 104,250 inhabitants in 2015. 149,280 live in the municipality, with the city being by far the most populated one. Helsingborg is the second-largest city in Scania (after Malmö) and ninth-largest in Sweden.

== Subdivisions ==
The City of Helsingborg is subdivided into 31 districts.

The districts of Helsingborg (Classification and census from 9 January 2006)
1	Norr (3600)	12	Centrum (3347)	22	Närlunda (1125)	Map of the districts of Helsingborg
2	Mariastaden (2302)	13	Eneborg (3816)	23	Eskilsminne (1835)	Map of the districts of Helsingborg
3	Ringstorp (2802)	14	Wilson Park (1988)	24	Gustavslund (2772)	Map of the districts of Helsingborg
4	Berga (1720)	15	Rosengården (4388)	25	Planteringen (2663)	Map of the districts of Helsingborg
5	Drottninghög (2708)	16	Husensjö (1564)	26	Elineberg (2115)	Map of the districts of Helsingborg
6	Dalhem (4530)	17	Sofieberg (1606)	27	Ramlösa (4593)	Map of the districts of Helsingborg
7*	Tågaborg (7113)	18	Adolfsberg (4319)	28	Miatorp (2406)	Map of the districts of Helsingborg
8	Stattena (2549)	19	Söder (3665)	29	Högasten (1034)	Map of the districts of Helsingborg
9	Fredriksdal (4202)	20	Högaborg (4017)	30	Ättekulla (3274)	Map of the districts of Helsingborg
10	Slottshöjden (3621)	21	Fältabacken (930)	31	Råå (3021)	Map of the districts of Helsingborg
11	Olympia (1843)					Map of the districts of Helsingborg

== Economy ==
=== Industry ===
Helsingborg is a major regional centre of trade, transport and business. In 2001 Campus Helsingborg, a branch of University of Lund, opened in the former Tretorn rubber factory buildings, founded by Henry Dunker. Three ferry companies take people and cargo to and from Denmark around the clock. The route is popular with day-trippers going to Helsingør or Copenhagen, or simply enjoying the views from the ferries. IKEA, the retailer of furniture and home interiors, has its international corporate headquarters in Helsingborg. Nicorette, the nicotine chewing gum, has a manufacturing plant there. Ramlösa is a mineral water from Ramlösa Brunn, a southern suburb of the city. Mobile phone developer Spectronic is also situated in Helsingborg. The online custom clothing retailer Tailor Store Sweden AB has its offices in Helsingborg. Zoégas, a major coffee company, has been located here since the 1800s.

Helsingborg is served by Ängelholm–Helsingborg Airport which is located about 34 km north of the city. The airport provides daily direct flights to Stockholm which is operated by Scandinavian Airlines. Other nearest airports are Malmö Airport, located 90 km to the south east and Copenhagen Airport, located 106 km away to the south west of the city.

== Cuisine ==
The beverage espresso and tonic first appeared on a menu in the city, at the coffeehouse Koppi Roasters in 2007.

== Sports ==
The following sports clubs are located in Helsingborg:

- Stattena IF
- Helsingborgs IF
- FC Helsingborg
- Helsingborgs HC
- Hittarps IK
- Högaborgs BK
- Ramlösa Södra FF
- HRC Gripen
- Helsingborg MCK
- FC Drottninghög
- Eskilsminne IF
- Helsingborgs FRK
- Kullavägens BK
- Helsingborg BBK

The Professional Bowlers Association (PBA) and World Bowling Tour (WBT) have jointly hosted a ten-pin bowling event in Sweden since 2017 called the Lucky Larsen Masters. Olympia Bowling in Helsingborg hosted the event in 2019, and is scheduled to host again in September 2023.

== Notable people ==
- Bernt Olsson, Chef
- Louise Hansson, World champion swimmer
- Marianne Bernadotte, former fashion model and actress
- Boel Berner, sociologist, historian, and editor
- Nick Bostrom, philosopher
- Kalle Brink, professional golfer
- Fabian Brunnström, ice hockey player
- Dieterich Buxtehude, composer and organist
- Elsa Collin, actress
- Covenant, synth band
- Darkane, metal band
- Elegant Machinery, synth band
- Pontus Farnerud, football player
- Louise Friberg, professional golfer
- Linn Grant, professional golfer
- Humanity's Last Breath, metal band
- Maja Ivarsson, lead singer of rock band The Sounds
- Joseph B. Johnson, Governor of the U.S. State of Vermont
- Alexander Kačaniklić, football player
- Karl Kruszelnicki, scientist (Dr Karl)
- Henrik Larsson, football player
- Ann Linde, former Swedish foreign minister
- Hampus Lindholm, ice hockey player
- Johan Liiva, musician
- Andreas Lilja, ice hockey player
- Anna Lundberg, actress
- Mikael Lundberg, golfer
- Mats Magnusson, football player
- Gunnar Nilsson, formula one driver
- Roland Nilsson, football player
- Tina Nordström, chef
- Thomas Öberg, lead singer of bob hund
- Oscar Olsson, educationalist
- Anette Olzon, singer
- Lina Perned, actress
- Peps Persson, musician
- Nils Poppe, comedian
- Ruben Rausing, founder of Tetra Pak
- Eva Rydberg, comedian
- Eric Saade, musician, presenter
- Marcus Schossow, electronic DJ
- Caroline Seger, football player
- Jay Smith, singer
- Soilwork, metal band
- Kalle Svensson, football player
- Terror 2000, metal band
- Tobias Törnkvist, ice hockey player
- Tove Lo, singer-songwriter
- Velvet, singer
- Östen Warnerbring, musician
- The Wasted Penguinz, DJ duo
- Johan Wissman, athlete

== Sights ==
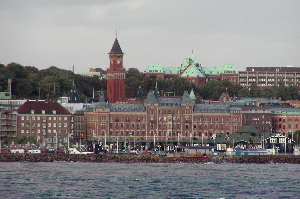
Helsingborg waterfront

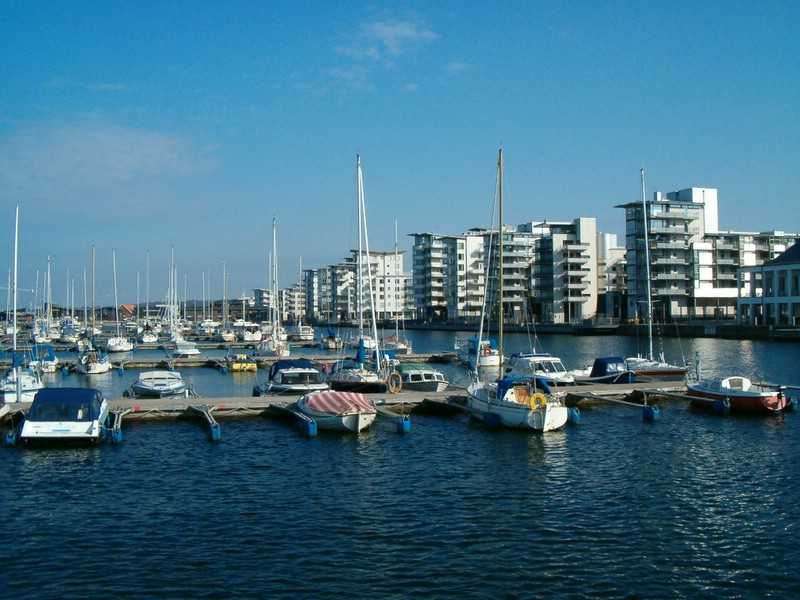
The northern harbour for yachts in Helsingborg

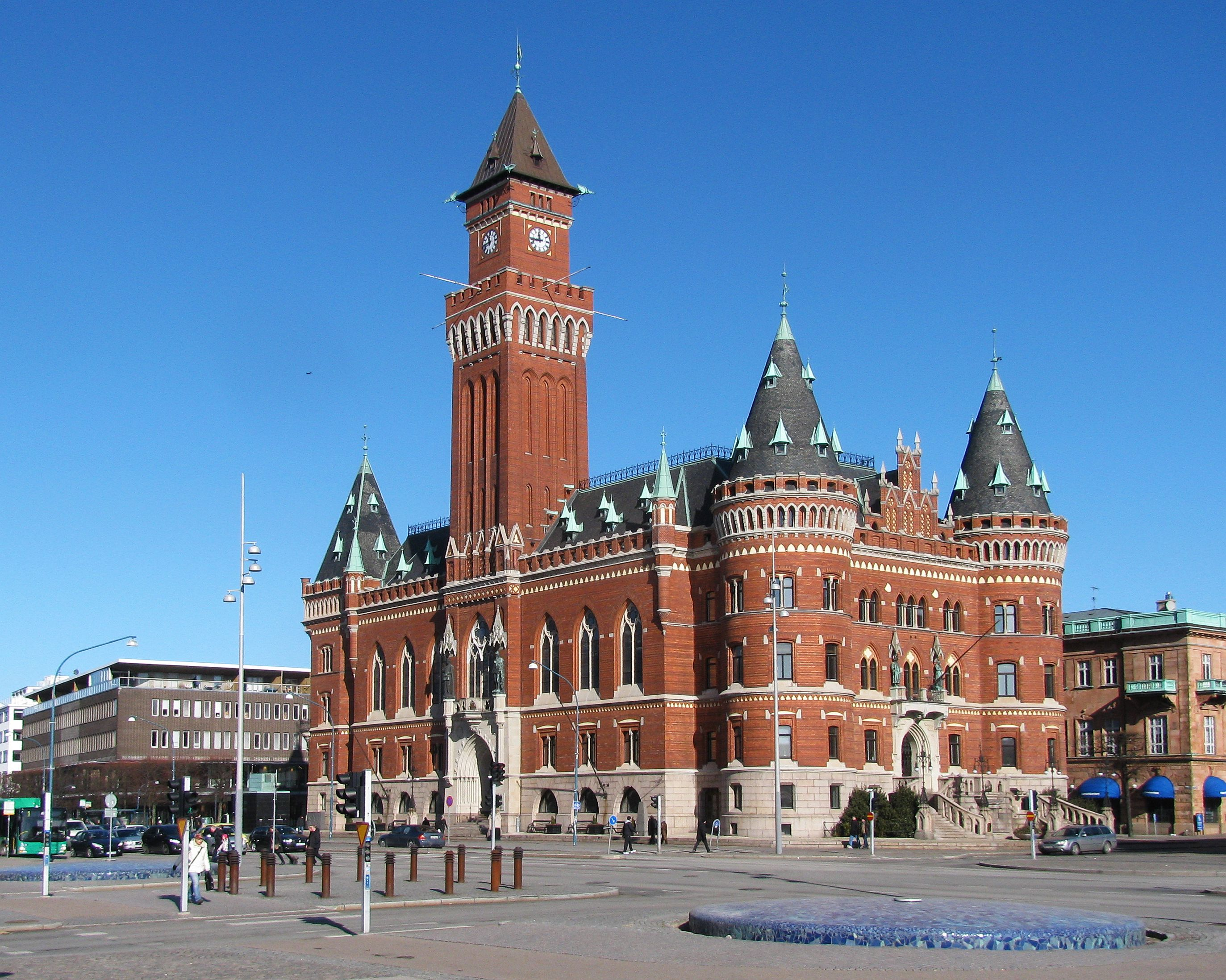
The Helsingborg city hall

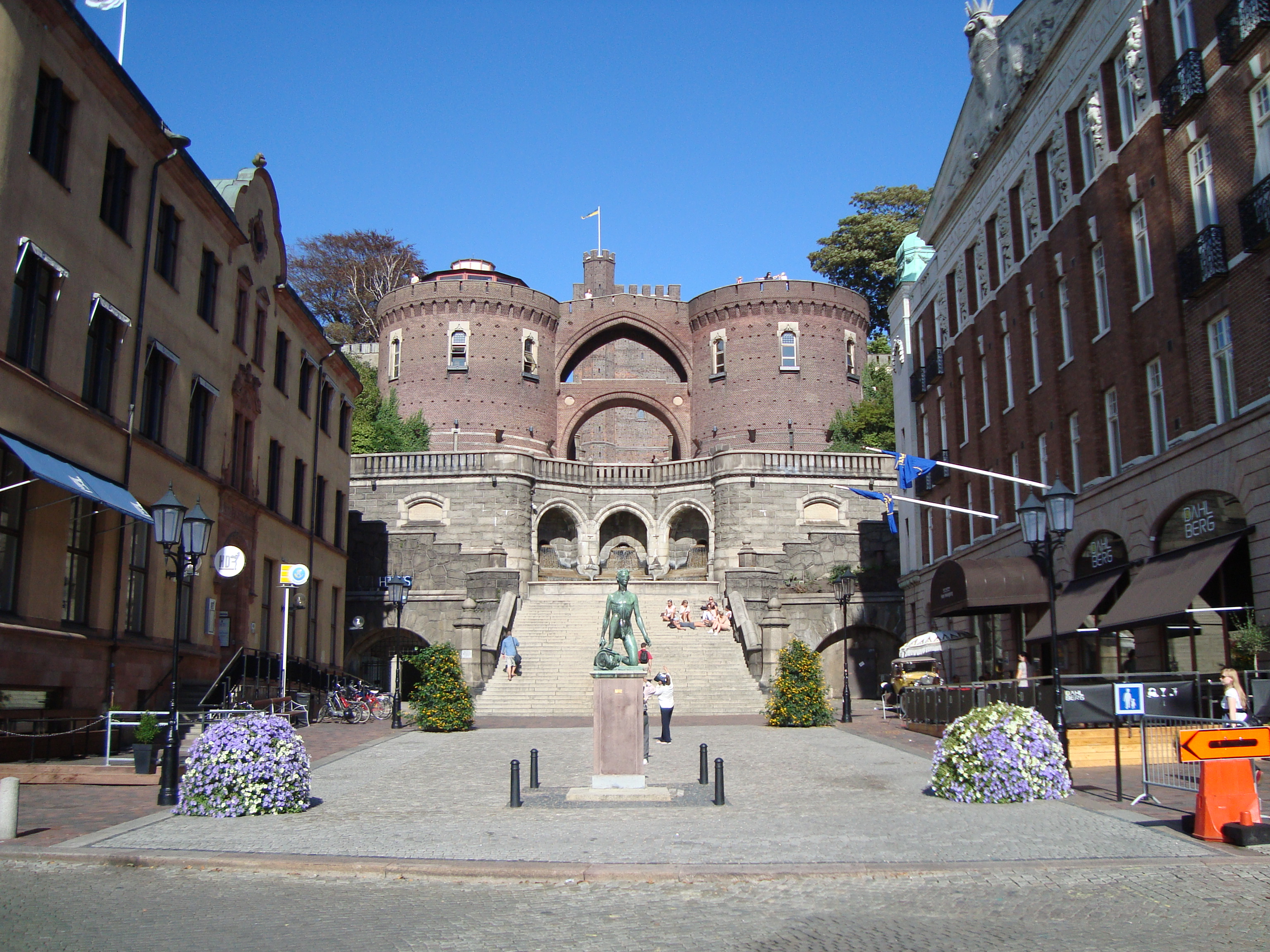
Steps leading to Kärnan, central Helsingborg, close by the water front.

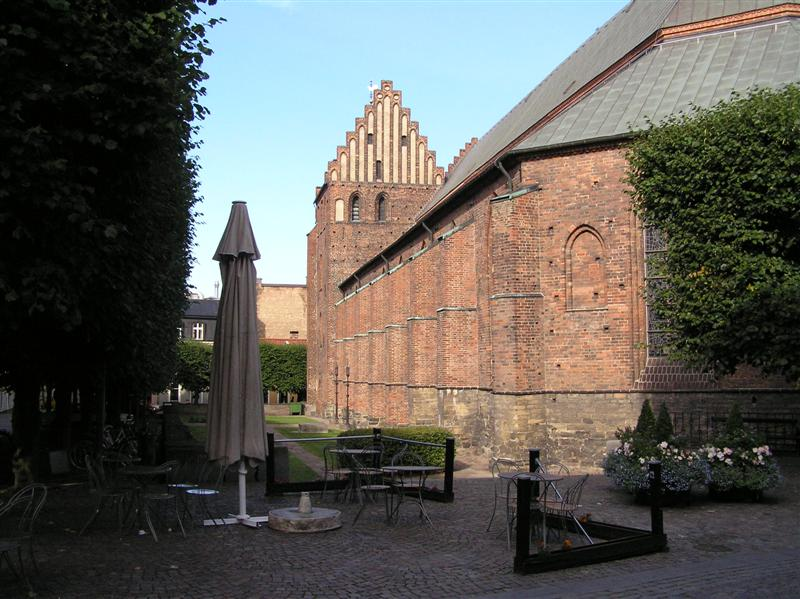
The Church of Saint Mary, central Helsingborg

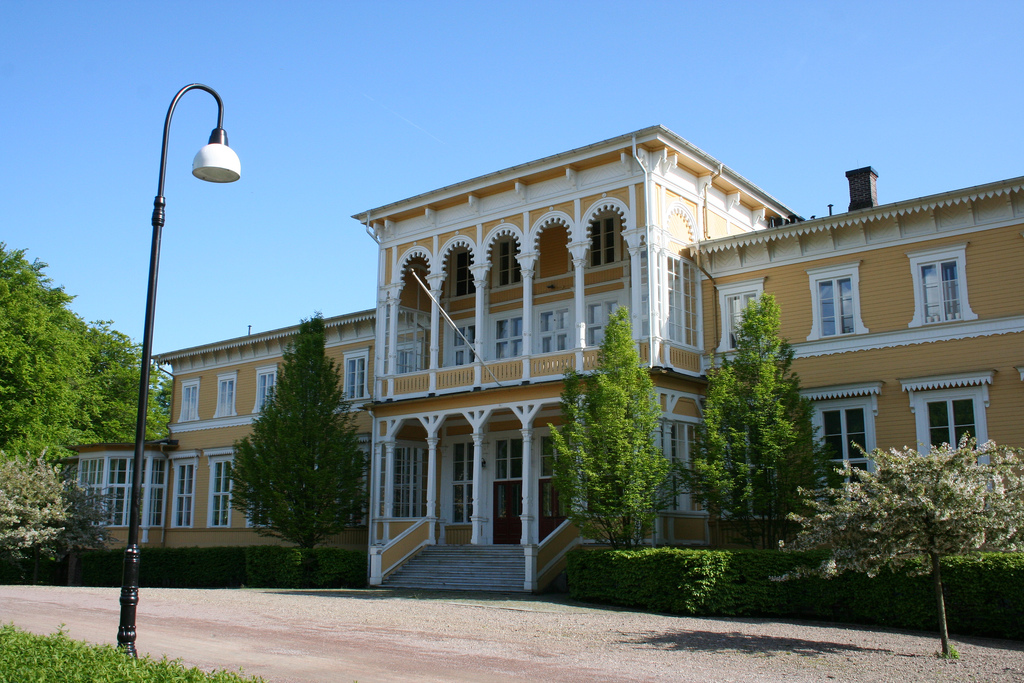
Brunnsparkshotellet, Ramlösa

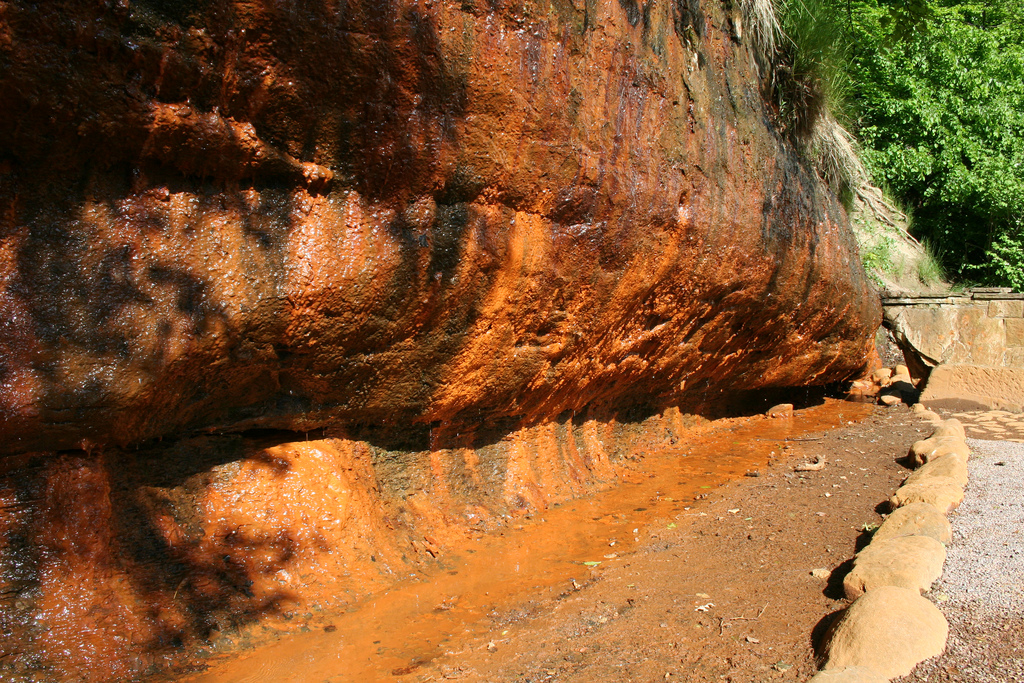
Ramlösa mineral water, old spring from 1707

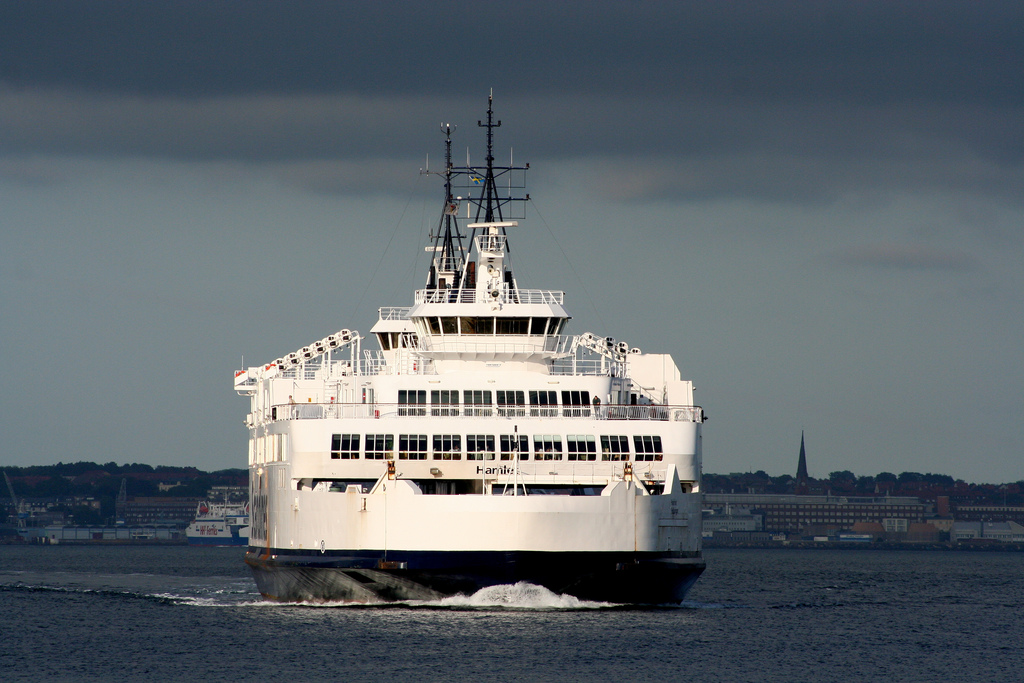
The ferry Hamlet on the Öresund between Helsingborg and Helsingør

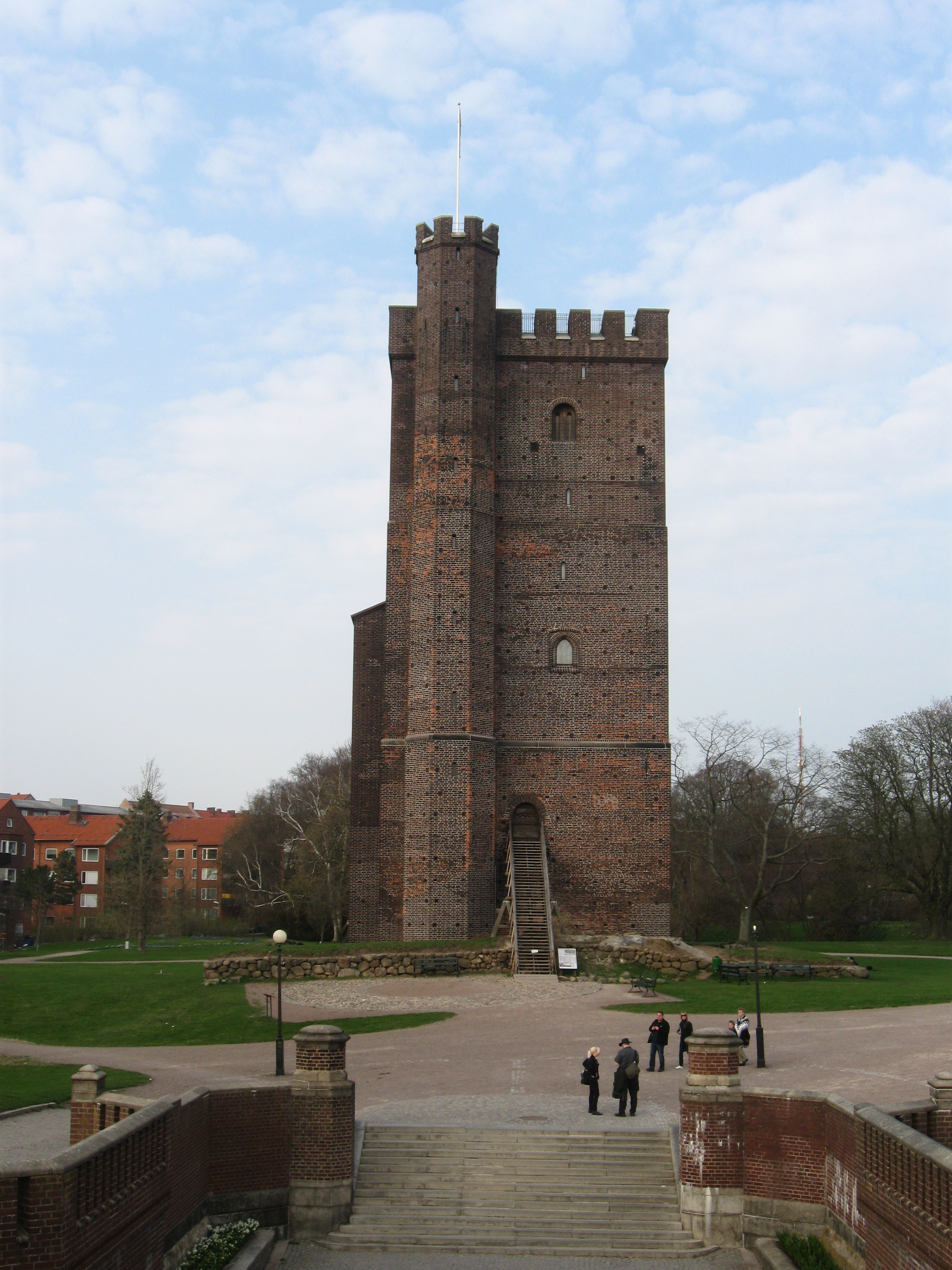
Kärnan, the medieval tower

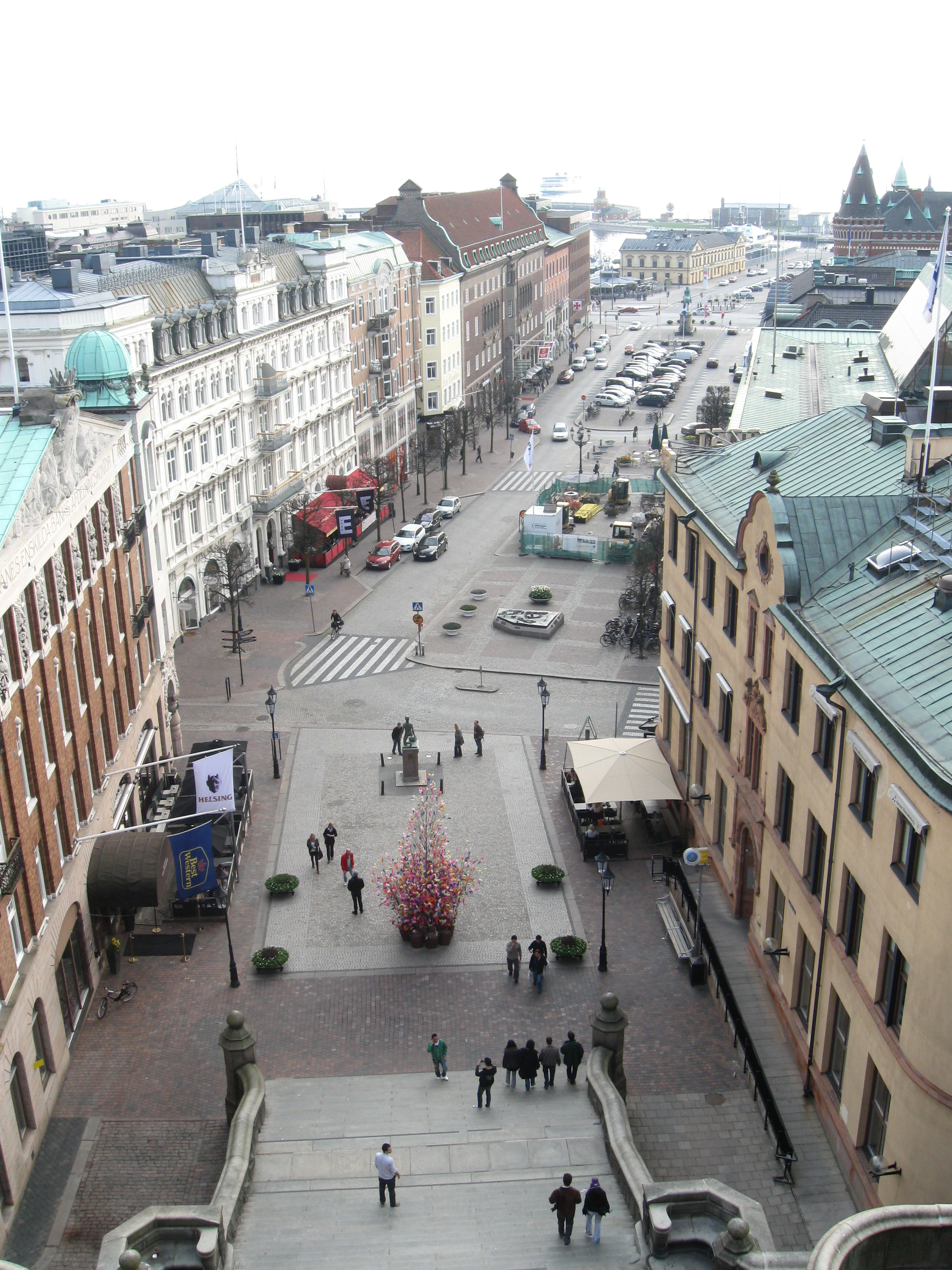
View over Helsingborg from Kärnan

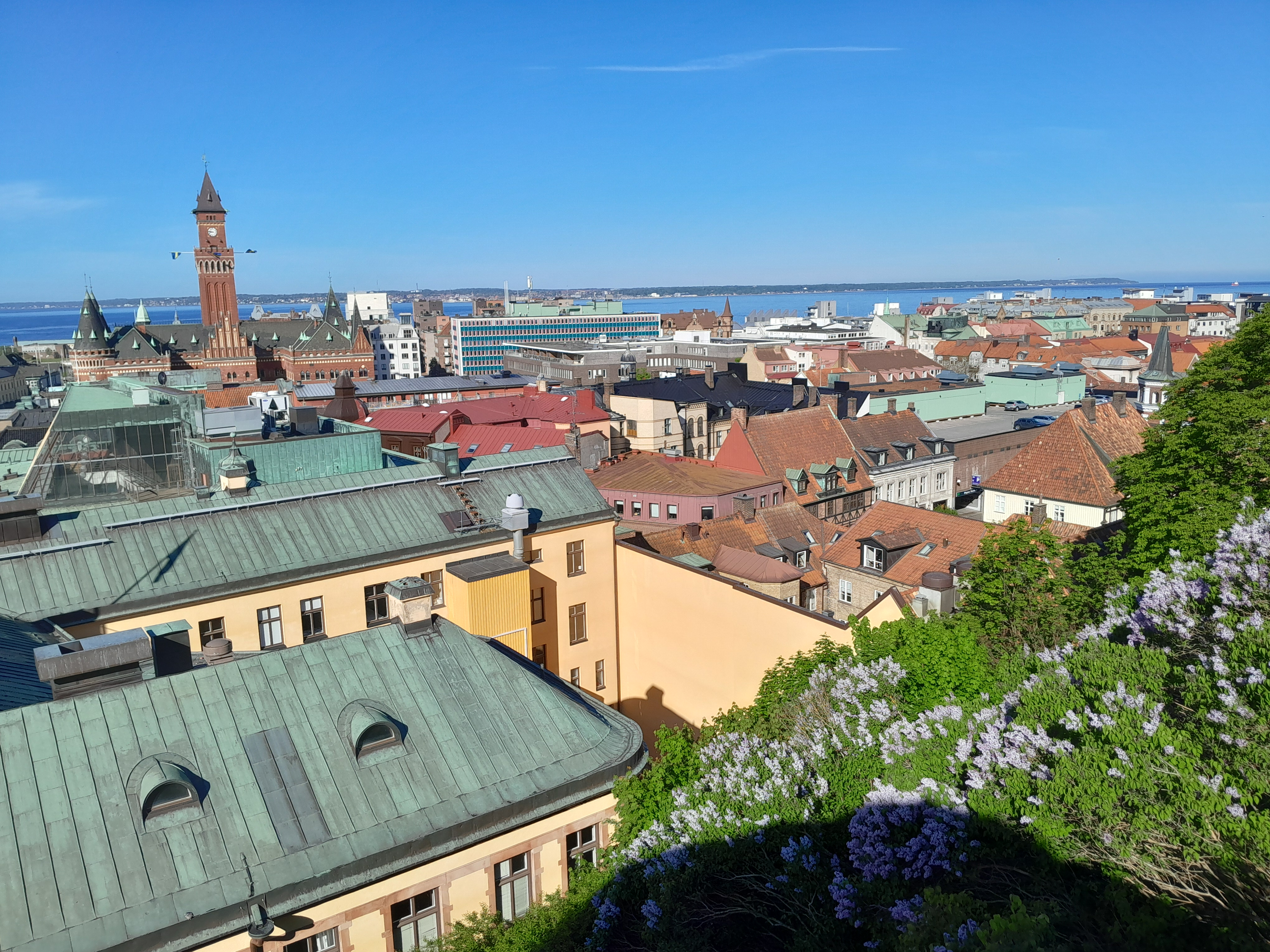
View over Helsingborg from Kärnan

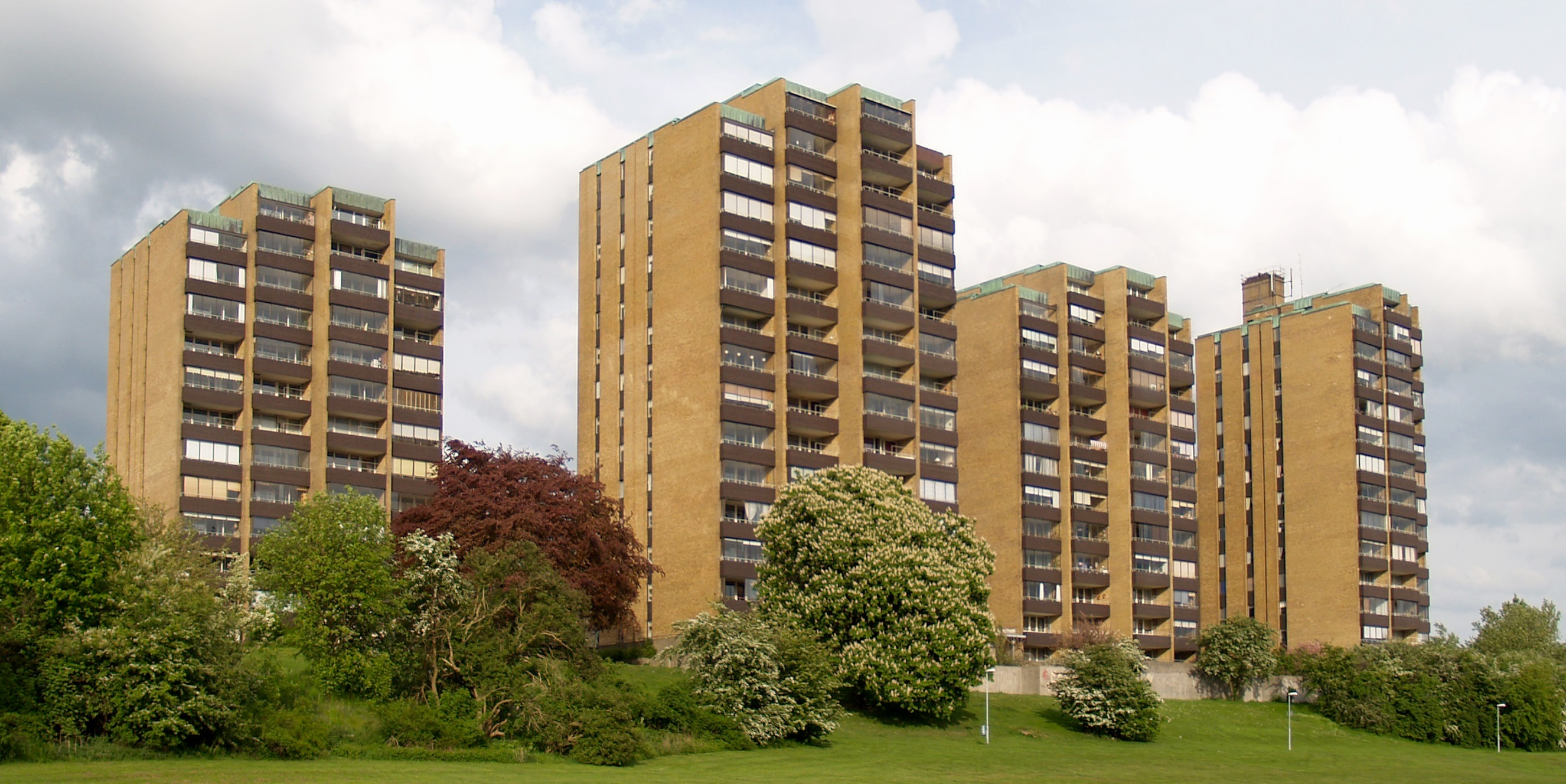
Jørn Utzon's Elineberg Housing development

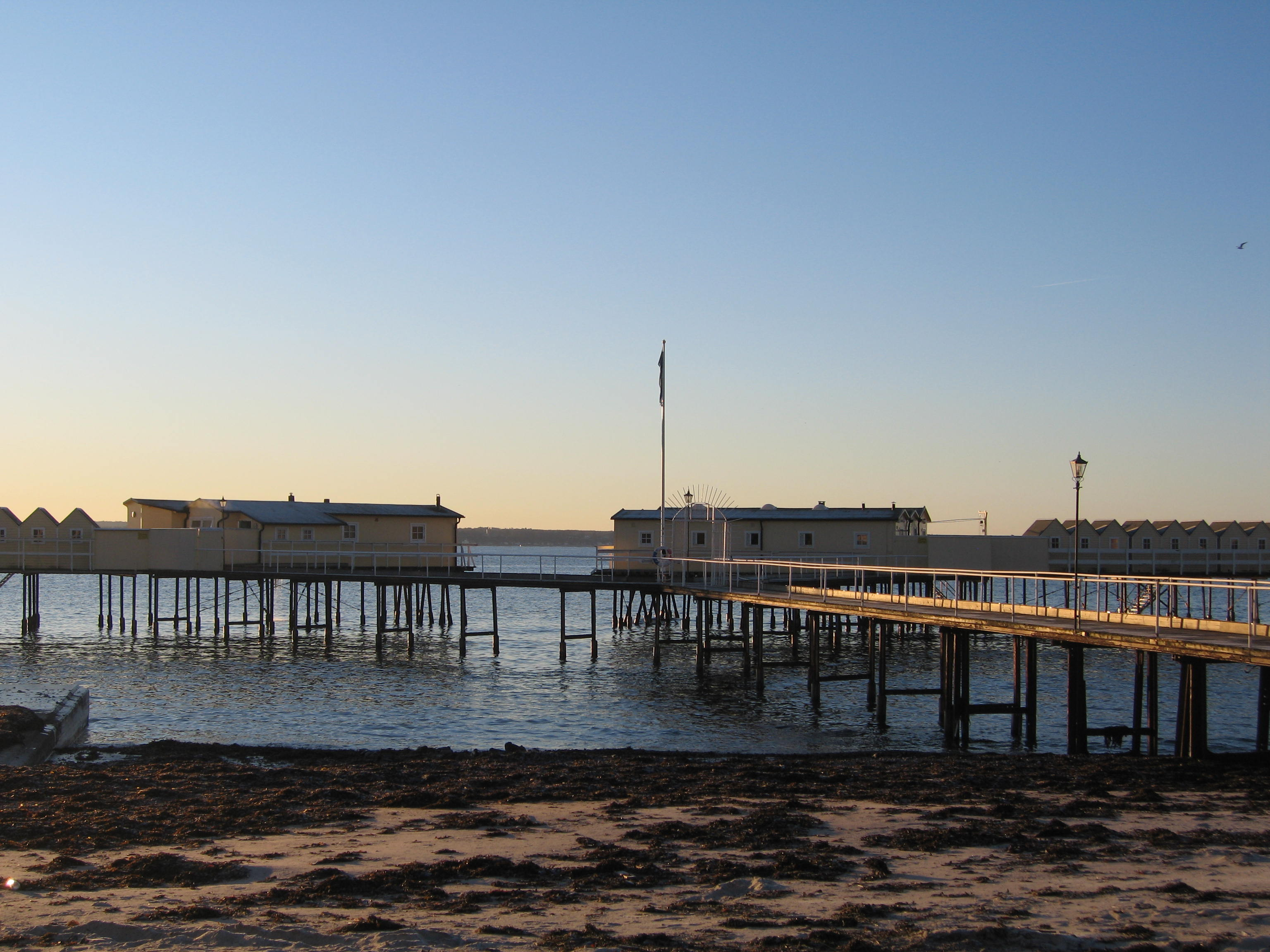
Swimming baths and sauna, Pålsjöbaden

== See also ==
- Port of Helsingborg
- European route E4
- Helsingborgs Dagblad
- Sofiero Palace, a nearby castle
