= Elsa Collin =

Swedish theatre critic, poet and actress

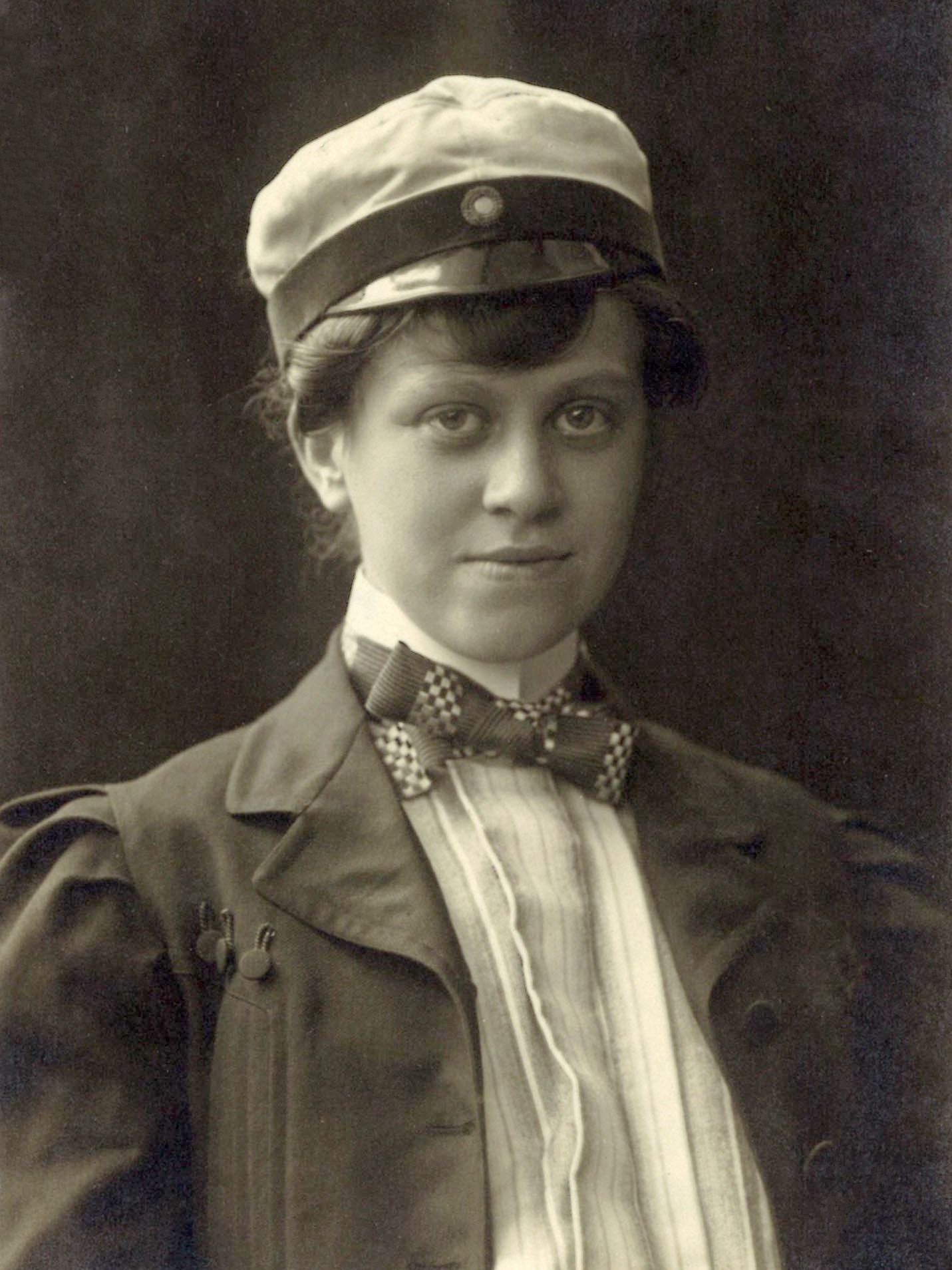
- Elsa Collin in a photo from 1907 during her first year as a student in Lund.
- Born: Elsa Sigrid Collin; 3 October 1887; Helsingborg, Sweden
- Died: 29 June 1941 (aged 53); Stockholm, Sweden

Elsa Sigrid Collin (3 October 1887 – 29 June 1941) was a Swedish theatre critic, poet and actress.

== Early life ==
Collin was the daughter of Knut Johan August Collin, a doctor in Helsingborg, and Sigrid Elvira Eskilsson. Elsa's mother died when she was just two years old; her father later remarried.

== Career ==
After finishing school in 1906, Collin completed her studentexamen in Gothenburg, and entered Lund University in 1907. Collin became the first woman at any Swedish university to be part of a student spex show playing the part of Susanna, the chambermaid, in a spex called Gerda; the spex also went on a tour to Malmö and Helsingborg. Collin was also active in the left-wing fraternity Den yngre gubben and wrote for the student paper with, among others, Vilhelm Ekelund, with whom she had a close relationship at the time.

After completing her bachelor's degree in 1909, Collin moved to Stockholm and entered Stockholm University, but mostly worked, initially as an actress in the theatre ensemble Lilla Teatern as well as Uppsala Teatern. Over time she came to work more for newspapers, first as a secretary at the Stockholm weekly Figaro and then as the Stockholm theatre critic for the Malmö newspaper Arbetet.

Collin published poetry in the Social Democratic women's magazine Morgonbris, including two overtly political poems, "Det dagas" (Day is dawning) and "Giv ditt namn!" (Give your name!) written in association with the women's suffrage assemblies of 1912 and 1913. The title of the second refers to a petition effort; the poem became an anthem of the movement in Sweden.

During her years in Stockholm, Collin became a close friend of writer and theatre leader Brita von Horn; the two women shared a residence in Skagen. Together they created the theatre group the Dramatist Studio (Dramatikerstudion) and wrote a play for the group based on von Horn's book Aschebergskan på Wittskövle. However, the piece did not receive its first performance until 1944, after Collin's death, when it was also Ingmar Bergman's inaugural production at the Helsingborg City Theatre.

== Death ==
Collin died in 1941. Her funeral took place in Stockholm, but she was buried in the Nya kyrkogården (New Cemetery) in her birthplace Helsingborg.
