= Orthopaedic Studio =

- Developer: Spectronic
- Stable release: 1.2.1 / November 22, 2011
- Operating system: Mac OS X
- Type: Medical
- License: Proprietary software
- Website: http://orthostudio.spectronic.se

Orthopaedic Studio is an application designed to help orthopaedic specialists perform several common quantitative hip examinations that are based on standard x-ray images.

The application is implemented as a plugin for the medical image viewer OsiriX and thereby only runs on Mac OS X.

Orthopaedic Studio evaluates four different types of hip radiographs (standing anteroposterior, Von Rosen, false profile and frog). On such images a number of standardized angles, offsets and ratios can be measured, including:

- Lateral collateral ligament angle
- Tönnis angle
- Joint space width
- Pelvic tilt and rotation
- Anterior centre edge angle
- Femoral head-neck offset ratio
- Frog Alpha angle
- Frog modified Alpha angle for slipped capital femoral epiphysis (SCFE)
- Epiphysis-metaphyseal offset for SCFE
- Southwick angle for SCFE

The following visual scores can also be registered:

- Break in Shenton's line
- Cross-over sign
- Posterior wall sign
- Tönnis classification
- Joint congruity
