= Carl von Horn (1903–1989) =

Swedish Army officer (1903–1989)

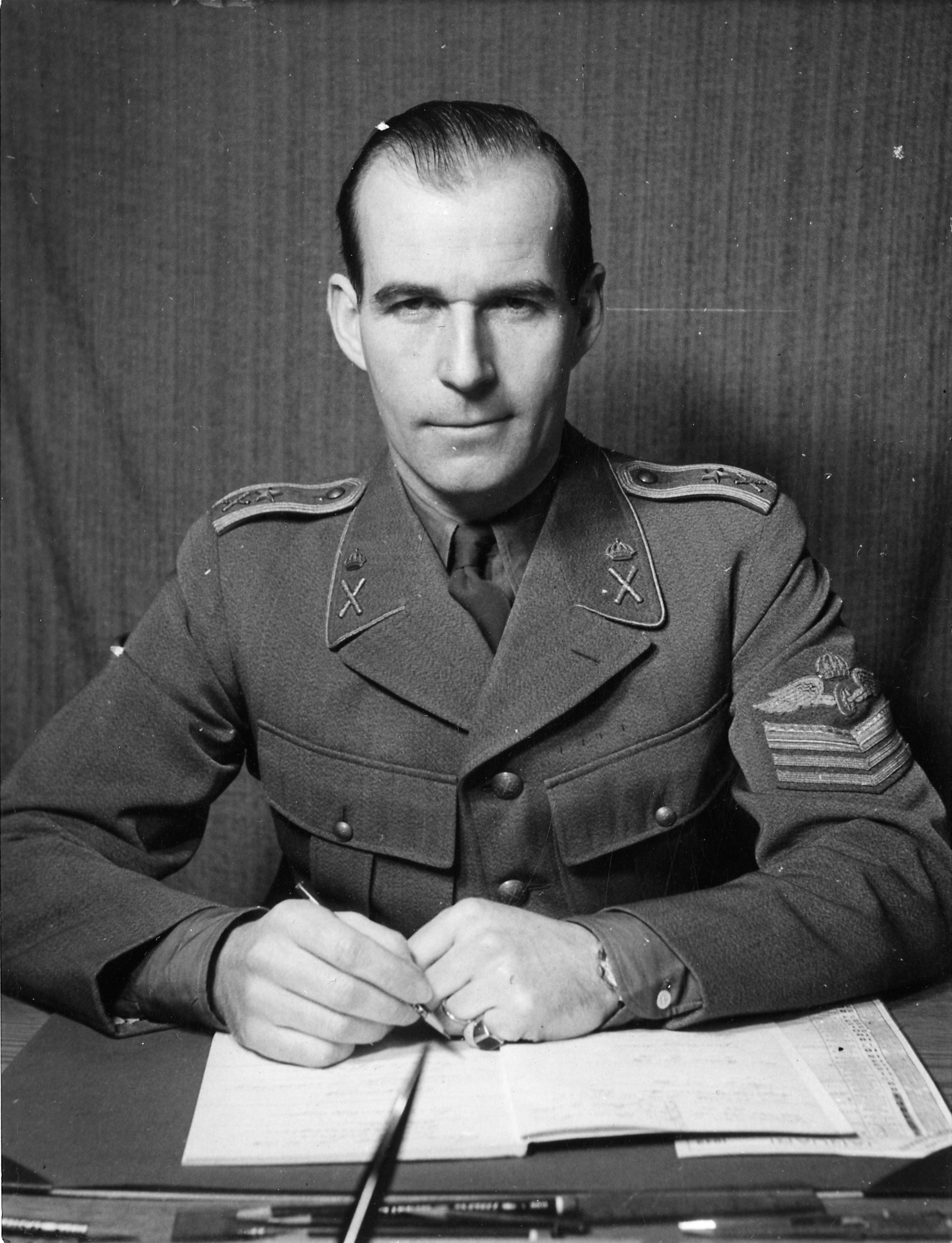
- Major von Horn in 1943
- Born: Carl C:son von Horn; 15 July 1903; Vittskövle, Sweden
- Died: 13 March 1989 (aged 85); Klagstorp, Sweden
- Burial place: Källstorp Cemetery, Trelleborg Municipality
- Relatives: Brita von Horn (aunt)
- Military career
- Branch: Swedish Army
- Service years: 1923–1963
- Rank: Major general
- Commands: Kronoberg Regiment; Malmö Defence District; United Nations Truce Supervision Organization; United Nations Operation in the Congo; United Nations Truce Supervision Organization; United Nations Yemen Observation Mission
- Conflicts: Congo Crisis

Major General Carl C:son von Horn (15 July 1903 – 13 March 1989) was a Swedish Army officer known for his service in various UN missions. He was the chief of United Nations Truce Supervision Organization in Palestine, the Force Commander of the United Nations Operation in the Congo during the Congo Crisis, and commander of United Nations Yemen Observation Mission in Yemen.

== Early life ==
Von Horn was born on 15 July 1903 in Vittskövle, Sweden, the son of Ryttmästare Carl von Horn (1876–1944) and his wife Martha (née Stjernswärd). His younger brother, Jan von Horn (1907–1987), also chose a military career and eventually became a colonel and military attaché in London and The Hague. His paternal uncle was the landowner and politician Hans von Horn (1871–1924), and his aunt was the novelist, dramatist, director, and theatre manager Brita von Horn (1886–1983).

== Career ==
=== Swedish Army ===
von Horn was commissioned as an officer in 1923 and was assigned to the Life Guards of Horse (K 1). He was promoted to captain of the General Staff in 1935 and served in the Swedish Army Service Troops in 1939. Von Horn was promoted to major of the General Staff Corps and the Defence Staff in 1942 and was director (byråchef) of the Royal Railway Board's military bureau.

During World War II he helped organizing prisoner exchange between the Germans and the Allies, but also had to work with the Swedish extradition of Baltic soldiers. As a military man with a strong Anglo-Saxon ethos he called this "the most humiliating moment in modern Swedish history." Von Horn was promoted to lieutenant colonel in 1945 when he also became head of the Defence Staff's Communication Department. In 1947, von Horn was appointed military attaché in Oslo, and the following year he moved to Copenhagen where he had received a similar appointment. In 1949 he returned to Sweden and took a position at the Northern Småland Regiment (I 12) and the following year he was promoted to colonel and commander of Kronoberg Regiment (I 11) in Växjö. He stayed there for seven years; in 1957, he was appointed commander of Malmö Defence District (Fo 11).

=== UN career ===
In early 1958, von Horn was appointed chief of United Nations Truce Supervision Organization in Palestine by Dag Hammarskjöld, and was then promoted to major general. At first he allowed himself "to be optimistic" and he wrote in his memoirs that "instead of fully armed troops, tanks and artillery or even the threat of sanctions, Dag's moral support and my own determination was everything I had." In 1960 he became with short notice the Force Commander of the United Nations Operation in the Congo during the beginning of what was to develop into the Congo Crisis, a mission, however, he was dismissed from six months later. Von Horn then returned to work for the UN in Palestine. In 1963 he was sent to lead the UN observatory group United Nations Yemen Observation Mission (UNYOM) in Yemen where fighting continued between government troops and rebels.

Von Horn has been described as an arrogant leader, and also during the mission in Yemen, he quarreled with his superiors. Von Horn suddenly resigned in protest and accused the UN not to provide enough resources for the mission, accusations that the Secretary-General U Thant described as "irresponsible and reckless". Von Horn had refused to abide by the UN organization's demands for policy adjustments and opposed when politicians wanted to aggravate the situation in the field.

== Personal life ==
Von Horn was married three times. In the first marriage 1925–1944 he was married to baroness Maud von Otter (1904–1974), the daughter of major, baron Carl-Gustaf von Otter and Elisabeth (née Krook). He married a second time in 1945 to Britt (Bibi) Englund (1919–1962), the daughter of the wholesaler Ernst Englund and Ebba (née Wistrand). He married a third time in 1964 to Elisabeth Liljeroth (born 1932).

== Death ==
Von Horn died on 13 March 1989 and was interred at Källstorp Cemetery in Trelleborg Municipality.

== Dates of rank ==
- 1935 – Captain
- 1942 – Major
- 1945 – Lieutenant colonel
- 1950 – Colonel
- 1963 – Major general (Note: von Horn became major general when he was appointed commander of United Nations Truce Supervision Organization in 1958, but he did not become major general in the Swedish Army until 1963.)

== Awards and decorations ==
=== Swedish ===
- (Sweden) Commander 1st Class of the Order of the Sword (6 June 1958)
- (Sweden) Knight of the Order of the Polar Star
- (Sweden) Knight of the Order of Vasa
- (Sweden) Swedish Central Federation for Voluntary Military Training Medal of Merit in silver
- (Sweden) Gold Medal of the Kronoberg Association for Volunteer Military Training (Kronobergs befäls (utbildnings) förbunds guldmedalj)
- (Sweden) Gold Medal of the Kronoberg Shooting Federation (Kronobergs skytteförbunds guldmedalj)
- (Sweden) Swedish Red Cross's silver medal

=== Foreign ===
- (Norway) Commander of the Order of St. Olav (1 July 1949)
- (United Kingdom) Officer of the Order of the British Empire
- (Belgium) Knight of the Order of Leopold II
- (Finland) Order of the Cross of Liberty, 4th Class with swords
- (Denmark) King Christian X's Liberty Medal
- (Norway) King Haakon VII Freedom Cross
- United Nations Emergency Force Medal

== Bibliography ==
- Horn, Carl von; Barklund, Gunnar (1966). Fredens soldater [Soldiering for Peace] (in Swedish). Stockholm: Norstedt. SELIBR 8081113.

== Footnotes ==
Military offices
Preceded by Hilding Kring	Defence Staff's Communications Department; 1945–1947	Succeeded by ?
Preceded by Gustaf Källner	Kronoberg Regiment; 1950–1957	Succeeded by Thor Cavallin
Preceded by David Hermelin	Malmö Defence District; 1957–1958	Succeeded by Wilhelm Reuterswärd
Preceded by Byron V. Leary	Chief of Staff, United Nations Truce Supervision Organization; 1958–1960	Succeeded by R.W. Rickert
Preceded by First holder	Force Commander, United Nations Operation in the Congo; 1960–1960	Succeeded by Sean MacEoin
Preceded by R.W. Rickert	Chief of Staff, United Nations Truce Supervision Organization; 1961–1963	Succeeded by Odd Bull
New command	Force Commander, United Nations Yemen Observation Mission; 1963–1963	Succeeded by Branko Pavlovic
