= Spectronic =

Swedish electronics company

- Industry: Medical, Communications
- Founded: 1964
- Headquarters: Helsingborg, Sweden
- Products: Radiation treatment planning, Image analysis, Orthopaedic Studio, Mobile phones
- Website: www.spectronic.se

Spectronic is a research and development company in Helsingborg, Sweden. Through its subsidiary, Spectronic Medical, the company is engaged in development of automated image analysis solutions for healthcare and medical industry. A flagship product is the technology for enabling fully MRI-based radiation treatment planning for tumor therapy.

Previously, Spectronic have developed and manufactured a series of advanced mobile telephones, and was one of the leading pioneers during the early days of modern mobile telephony.

== Multimedia telephones ==
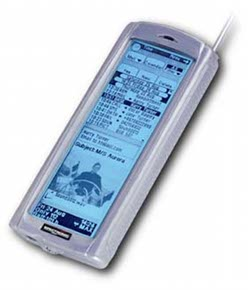
The Spectronic TS2200 Multimedia telephone

The Spectronic NMT mobile phone

Previous products include the Spectronic TS2000 Multimedia smartphone, which was initially released in the year 1999. This was the first mobile phone ever with a built-in digital camera. The TS2000 model was succeeded by the slightly upgraded TS2200 model in the year 2001, which was manufactured until the year 2004.

The Spectronic Multimedia smartphones had an input interface called Sidetouch, with which the user could control the entire phone only by touching on its sides. Other features of the phones included emailing, SMS, MMS, fax and a web browser.

== NMT phones ==
Prior to the Multimedia telephones, Spectronic manufactured a series of handheld phones for the analog NMT mobile network. These were sold both under the Spectronic brand name, but also under the Ericsson and Siemens brand names. The first Spectronic NMT, an incredibly durable phone, was released in 1989. Its successor, which was released in 1990, was the first handheld mobile phone which could manage simultaneous data and voice transmissions. It supported both fax and text messaging.

== Awards ==
Award received by Spectronic include:

- The gold medal of the Royal Swedish Academy of Engineering Sciences, 1995
- The Polhem prize, 1992
- The Export Enterprise of the Year in Sweden
- The Electronic Enterprise of the Year in Sweden
