= Högaborg =

Coordinates: 56°02′20″N 12°42′44″E

Location of Högaborg in Helsingborg

Högaborg is a district of the Swedish city of Helsingborg situated south of the town center and east of Söder. It is inhabited by about 4,000 people, more than half of them immigrants. It is the home of the football club Högaborgs BK, where football player Henrik Larsson played during his youth. He rejoined the club in 2013, 21 years after his first spell ended.
