= Brita von Horn =

Swedish writer and director

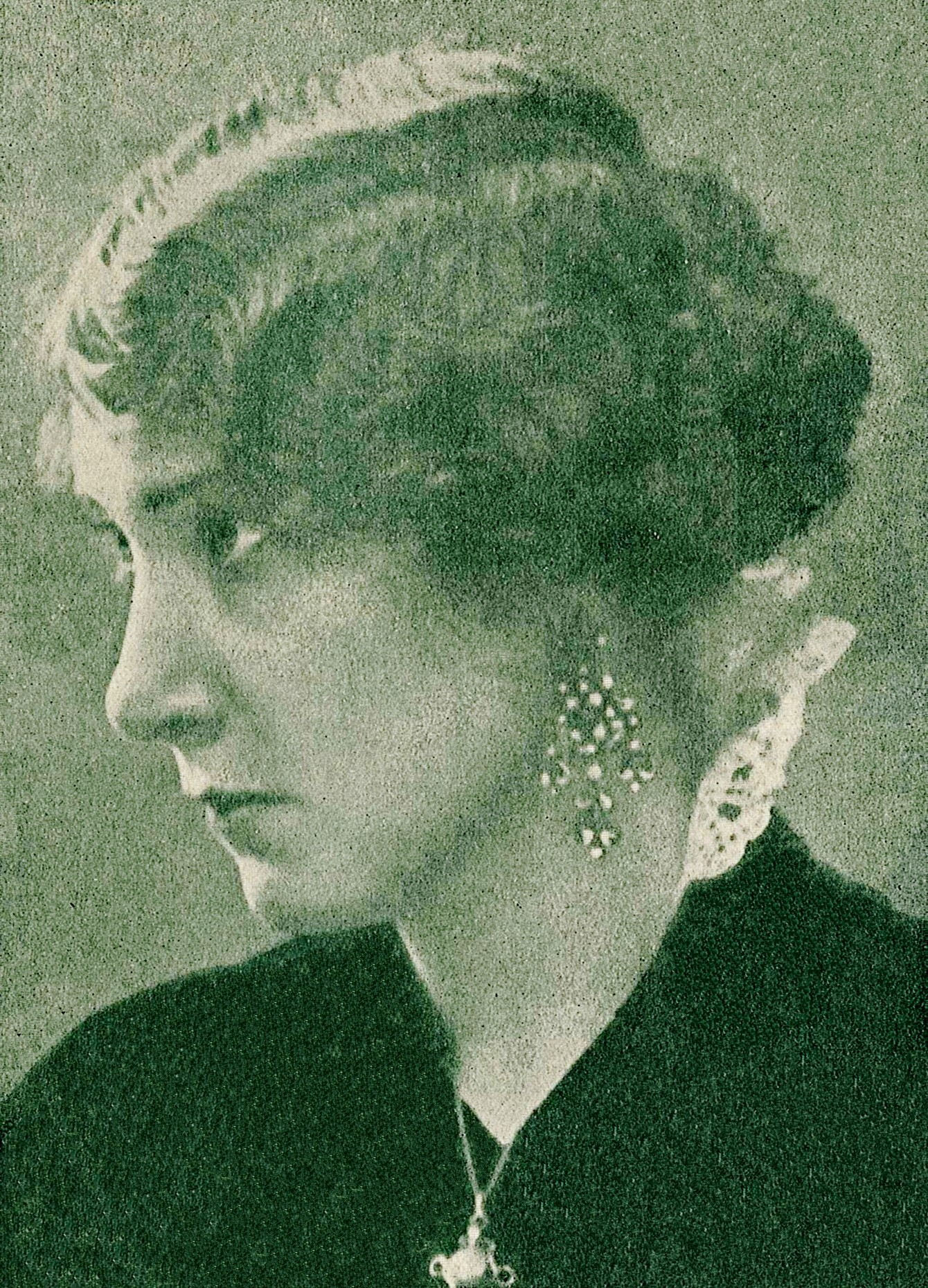
- Brita von Horn, circa 1918
- Born: Brita Clara Alice Augusta Florence von Horn; 1 April 1886; Stockholm, Sweden
- Died: 14 February 1983 (aged 96); Skagen, Denmark
- Occupations: Novelist, dramatist, director, theatre leader
- Relatives: Carl von Horn (nephew)

Brita Clara Alice Augusta Florence von Horn (1 April 1886 – 14 February 1983) was a Swedish novelist, dramatist, director and theatre leader. She worked in the theatre scene in Stockholm and published several books.

== Career ==
von Horn was born in Stockholm, Sweden and was the daughter of chamberlain Henning von Horn and baroness Florence Bonde. She was the aunt of major general Carl von Horn (1903–1989) and Colonel Jan von Horn (1907–1987). von Horn started several theatrical groups and was the first person to stage a play by Anton Chekhov in Sweden. In the early 1930s she started the Theater at Sveavägen, which however went bankrupt after only a few years. In 1940, she was a co-founder with Vilhelm Moberg and Helge Hagerman of the Dramatist Studio of Sweden (Swedish: Sveriges dramatikers studio, Dramatikerstudion). The studio's first two plays were Ebbe Linde's Brudsporre and Dicte Sjögren's Pappersväggen.

As a writer, von Horn made her debut in 1912 with Lucrezia, subtitled "a drama from the days of the Renaissance in three acts". In 1917 her play Kring drottningen had its premiere at the Swedish Theatre with Pauline Brunius and Gösta Ekman in the lead roles. It was a success and launched her reputation. The first-ever broadcast by the Radio Theatre division of Sveriges Radio was of her play Kungens amour, broadcast on 11 January 1925. Between 1930 and 1941 she was a drama critic for the newspapers Östergötlands Dagblad and Arbetet. She also wrote articles and gave lectures throughout her life.

With Elsa Collin, a close friend with whom she shared a residence for a time and who was also involved in the Dramatist Studio, von Horn co-wrote a play for the group based on her book Aschebergskan på Wittskövle. However, the piece did not receive its first performance until 1944, some years after Collin's death, when it was first performed by the Dramatist Studio and shortly after as Ingmar Bergman's inaugural production at the Helsingborg City Theatre.

Von Horn died in 1983 a few months short of her 97th birthday.

== Bibliography ==
- Lucrezia, play, 1912
- Kring drottningen, play, 1917
- Yttersta dagen, play, 1919
- Den döda gården, novel, 1922
- Syndens lön, novel, 1923
- Kungens amour, play, radio broadcast 1925
- Hennes nåd översten, novel, 1925
- Kärlekens narr, novel, 1929
- Jakobs dröm, 1929
- Bobo och aristokraterna, novel, 1938
- Dear baroness, 1963
- Hornstötar ur kulissen, memoirs 1965
