= United Nations Yemen Observation Mission =

International monitoring mission, from 1963

The UN Yemen Observation Mission (UNYOM) was established in 1963.

North Yemen entered into a state of civil war in 1962. Yemen had joined Egypt in 1958, and then in 1962, separated again, sparking the conflict.

To ensure that this conflict did not escalate into an international incident, the UN set up the UN Yemen Observation Mission.

Around 1963, Saudi Arabia and Egypt became involved in the civil war. The task of UNYOM was to monitor Saudi Arabia and Egypt in order to make sure they did not tilt the conflict one way or another and avoided causing a potentially harmful dispute through that part of the Middle East.

== Commanders ==
UNYOM's commanders:

- Major General Carl von Horn (Sweden) – July–August 1963
- Colonel Branko Pavlovic (Yugoslavia) (acting) – August–September 1963
- Lieutenant General P.S. Gyani (India) – September–November 1963

== Chiefs of Staff ==
UNYOM's Chiefs of Staff:

- Colonel Branko Pavlovic (Yugoslavia) – November 1963
- Colonel S.C. Sabharwal (India) – November 1963 – September 1964
- Colonel A.M Demianus (Greece) – September – December 1964
