= Dramatist Studio of Sweden =

The Dramatist Studio of Sweden (Swedish: Sveriges dramatikers studio, Dramatikerstudion) is a Swedish theatre group founded in 1940 with the objective of performing new plays by Swedish and other Scandinavian dramatists.

The group was started in 1939 and officially organised in 1942 in Stockholm by the writers Brita von Horn and Vilhelm Moberg and the actor and producer Helge Hagerman. Horn's friend the drama critic Elsa Collin was the secretary. The objective was to counter the carefully neutral dramatic offerings by the official theatres during World War II and encourage playwrights to write drama relevant to contemporary politics.

There are varying accounts of whose idea the group originally was, but Horn was the driving force behind it. Moberg was initially the president, later succeeded by the author Bertil Malmberg. The actor Börje Mellvig was artistic director at one point. Horn herself took over as leader until 1958.

Initially the Dramatist Studio had no fixed home, presenting plays in various locations including touring productions. It was later based at Hamngatan 28, in the former flat of the operetta prima donna Anna Norrie, where from 1950 the company presented chamber theatre as had previously been done in Germany, and in America by Orson Welles. (The site is now occupied by an H & M and a carpark.) In 1948 the company added the Bygdeteater, a programme to present plays in rural areas in collaboration with agricultural organisations and the National Swedish Touring Theatre.

Ingmar Bergman directed several plays for the Dramatist Studio in 1943–44. The group gave playwrights an opportunity to experiment and launched the careers of some actors and directors; it also produced some unknown works by famous Swedish dramatists. Others associated with it include Willy Peters, Gunnar Sjöberg, Tord Stål, Ingrid Luterkort, Sif Ruud, Ingrid Borthen and Gunnar Björnstrand, and the directors Olof Molander and Per Lindberg.
