= Volrath Tham =

Volrath Tham or Vollrath Tham may refer to:

== People ==
- Volrath Tham (councillor) (1629–1700), German-born Swedish councillor and merchant
- Volrath Tham (industrialist) (1867–1946), Swedish industrialist and member of parliament
- Vollrath Tham (1913–1995), Swedish Army officer
- Vollrath Tham (politician) (1837–1909), Swedish proprietor and member of parliament

== Other ==
- SS Vollrath Tham (1909), ore carrier steamship
- Volrath Tham (student housing), student housing of SGS Studentbostäder
- Volrat Thamsgatan, street in Johanneberg, Gothenburg
