= Grill =

Grill or grille may refer to:

== Food ==
- Barbecue grill, a device or surface used for cooking food, usually fuelled by gas or charcoal, or the part of a cooker that performs this function
- Flattop grill, a cooking device often used in restaurants, especially diners
- George Foreman Grill, a double-sided portable electrically heated grill
- Grill, a restaurant that serves grilled food, such as a "bar and grill"
- Grilling, a form of cooking that involves direct heat
- Mixed grill, a combination of traditional grilled foods

== Music ==
- Grill Music Venue, an Irish nightclub located in Letterkenny, County Donegal
- "Grillz", a 2005 rap single by Nelly

== People ==
- Grill family, Swedish family involved in the Swedish East India Company
- Andrea Grill (born 1975), Austrian biologist
- Bernhard Grill (born 1961)
- Claes Eric Grill (1851–1919), Swedish army officer and entomologist
- Jean Abraham Grill (1736–1792), Swedish merchant

== Ships ==
- German aviso Grille
- SMS Grille

== Other uses ==
- Grill (cryptology), method used chiefly early on, before the advent of the cyclometer, by the mathematician-cryptologists of the Polish Cipher Bureau in decrypting the German Enigma machine
- Grill (jewelry), a form of dental jewelry commonly associated with hip hop
- Grill (philately), a pattern of indentations on a postage stamp
- Grill, a verb meaning to interrogate someone
- Grille (artillery), a self-propelled artillery piece used by Germany during World War II
- Grille (cryptography), a technique for encrypting a plaintext by writing it onto a sheet of paper through a pierced sheet
- Grille (car), an opening in the bodywork of a vehicle to allow air to enter
- "Grille", synonym of "register", "return" in HVAC system
- Grille (architecture), architectural element
- Grille, a decorative window muntin for simulating separate panes
- Grillwork, decorative grating

== See also ==
- Grills (disambiguation)
- Teppanyaki
