= Sundsvall Anti-Aircraft Regiment =

Coordinates: 62°22.615′N 17°18.530′E

- Sundsvalls luftvärnsregemente
- Active: 1940–1982
- Country: Sweden
- Allegiance: Swedish Armed Forces
- Branch: Swedish Army
- Type: Anti-aircraft
- Size: Regiment
- Part of: A 4 (1940); A 9 (1940–1941); A 10 (1941–1942); II.milo (1942–1966); Milo NN (1966–1982)
- Garrison/HQ: Sundsvall
- Colors: Blue and white
- March: "Sundsvalls luftvärnsregemente marsch" (Ohlsson) (Note: The marsch was adopted in 1944 and established in 1953 by Army Order 33/1953.)

Insignia
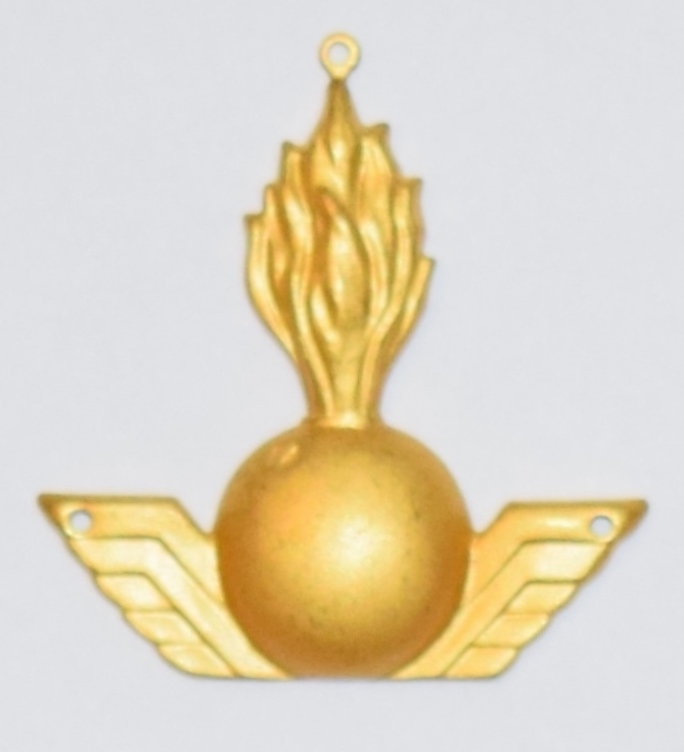
- Branch insignia

Sundsvall Anti-Aircraft Regiment (Swedish: Sundsvalls luftvärnsregemente, Lv 5) was a Swedish Army anti-aircraft unit that operated between 1940 and 1982. The unit was based in Sundsvall.

== History ==
Through the Defence Act of 1936, the air defense was given a more independent role in the Swedish artillery, which among other things resulted in a number of anti-aircraft divisions being organized, where, among other things, a division was relocated to Sundsvall. The division was raised as a preparedness division of Östgöta Anti-Aircraft Artillery Regiment (A 10) on 4 October 1940. On 1 October 1941, the preparedness division was reorganized into Sundsvall Anti-Aircraft Division (A 10 Su). Through the Defence Act of 1942, it was decided to separate the air defense from the artillery to form its own branch and on 1 October of the same year, the Swedish Air Defense Troops (Luftvärnstrupperna) was formed. The change resulted, among other things, in the Sundsvall Anti-Aircraft Division being separated from the Östgöta Anti-Aircraft Regiment to be organized on 1 October 1942 as the Sundsvall Anti-Aircraft Corps (Lv 5). After a temporary placement at Gustav Adolfskolan on Södra Järnvägsgatan in Sundsvall, the corps was officially placed on 12 April 1943 in a barracks establishment at Regementsvägen 8.

Prior to the Defence Act of 1958, the Chief of the Army proposed that Sundsvall Anti-Aircraft Corps (Lv 5) should be disbanded by 1960. Training in Sundsvall should instead be distributed to other air defense units, including Luleå Anti-Aircraft Corps (Lv 7) about 50 km north. The background to the proposal was entirely economic, as the Supreme Commander of the Swedish Armed Forces considered that a disbandment of Sundsvall Anti-Aircraft Corps was advantageous in view of established inconveniences from a preparedness and recruitment point of view. The savings were estimated at approximately SEK 0.6 million per year. On 9 February 1959, the Chief of the Army, Lieutenant General Thord Bonde proposed an amendment to parts of the Defence Act, where he instead proposed that Sundsvall Anti-Aircraft Corps should remain as a peace unit. Instead, Karlsborg Anti-Aircraft Regiment (Lv 1) would be removed from the peace organization because it was considered that conscripts should be trained in probable areas of operation as far as possible. Furthermore, it was considered that the technical development in the outside world had increased the possibilities for coup-like attacks, something that suggested that peace units in what was judged to be particularly vulnerable parts of the country should be maintained. In favour of maintaining Karlsborg Anti-Aircraft Regiment, was the good local training conditions they had together with the air force and space for an annual training contingent of 800 conscripts. Only Roslagen Anti-Aircraft Regiment (Lv 3) trained more conscripts annually, while Sundsvall Anti-Aircraft Corps had room for a training contingent of 500 conscripts. However, the disbandment of Karlsborg Anti-Aircraft Regiment came to affect all air defense units as there was a shortage of accommodation at the other air defense units, but also in the form that the garrison in Sundsvall was in need of various functional buildings. The total investment need for construction work at the remaining air defense units was estimated at SEK 4.9 million of which Sundsvall accounted for an investment need of approximately SEK 1.2 million, in the form of completion of workshops, non-commissioned officers' mess, classrooms, an additional artillery hall and completion of the corps' firing range at Åstön training area.

In connection with the OLLI reform, which was carried out in the Swedish Armed Forces in the years 1973–1975, Västernorrland Regiment (I 21) was amalgamated with Västernorrland Defence District (Västernorrlands försvarsområde, Fo 23) and formed in 1974 the defence district regiment (försvarsområdesregemente) I 21/Fo 23. This led to Sundsvall Anti-Aircraft Corps, which was part of Västernorrland Defence District, became a B unit (training regiment) and that its mobilization and materiel responsibility was transferred to Västernorrland Regiment, which consequently became an A unit (defence district regiment). At the same time, the corps was reorganized into a regiment on 1 July 1974 and thus adopted the name Sundsvall Anti-Aircraft Regiment (Lv 5). The Government Bill 1977/78:65, concerning certain organizational issues, etc. concerning the Swedish defence, was adopted by the Riksdag on 15 December 1977. The bill contained, among other things, a disbandment of Sundsvall Anti-Aircraft Regiment. The background was, among other things, that the government in its bill considered that Sundsvall Anti-Aircraft Regiment had unsatisfactory access to training areas in Sundsvall and that the barracks establishment in Sundsvall was in need of extensive investments in order to be maintained in the long term, furthermore, it was also not suitable to be expanded to accommodate larger training units. Prior to the bill, the Swedish government's inquiry had come to the conclusion that only one air defense unit could be disbanded for reasons of saving and rationalization.

The inquiry had examined the conditions for disbanding Sundsvall Anti-Aircraft Regiment or Göta Anti-Aircraft Regiment (Lv 6). To the detriment of the Sundsvall Anti-Aircraft Regiment, the investigation pointed out, among other things, that the conscripts were largely recruited from the Western Military District, which meant that they were trained far from their hometown, while the Göta Anti-Aircraft Regiment recruited its conscripts from the Gothenburg region. Furthermore, a disbandment of Sundsvall Anti-Aircraft Regiment would affect fewer people than a disbandment of the Göta Anti-Aircraft Regiment. Against a disbandment was the ability to train air defense units in winter conditions would be reduced, and that the regiment at close range had the air defense's best training area, Åstön. To avoid a disbandment, the inquiry had also examined the possibilities of co-locating Sundsvall Anti-Aircraft Regiment with Norrland Coast Coastal Artillery Defence with Härnösand Coastal Artillery Regiment (NK/KA 5) in Härnösand. However, that proposal was not considered to be financially justified, as it would entail an increase of approximately SEK 45 million over a 20-year period. The inquiry therefore advocated the disbandment of Sundsvall Anti-Aircraft Regiment during the financial year 1983/1984. On 30 June 1982, the regiment was disbanded and remained a decommissioning organization until 31 December 1982. It was subordinated to the commander of Västernorrland Regiment (I 21). The decommissioning organization was dissolved on 31 December 1982.

== Locations and training areas ==
=== Barracks ===
In connection with the Östgöta Anti-Aircraft Regiment detached a preparedness division on 4 October 1940 to Sundsvall, it was relocated to Gustav Adolfsskolan on Södra Järnvägsgatan, as well as with staff at Hotel Knaust on Kyrkogatan and in Tingshuset on Storgatan. After the detachment was separated from the regiment on 1 October 1942 and formed Sundsvall Anti-Aircraft Corps (Lv 5), the corps was relocated on 12 April 1943 to a newly built barracks area by Regementsvägen. From 1 January 1983, a barracks and the school building at the barracks area within the belonging to the Swedish Armed Forces remained, which were managed by Västernorrland Defence District (Västernorrlands försvarsområde, Fo 23). In 2000, the ground on which the nearby shooting range was located was decontaminated from lead. The shooting range was demolished in 2011 to restore the ground. On 30 April 2013, the area was completely abandoned, which had then been used by, among others, Medelpad Home Guard Battalion.

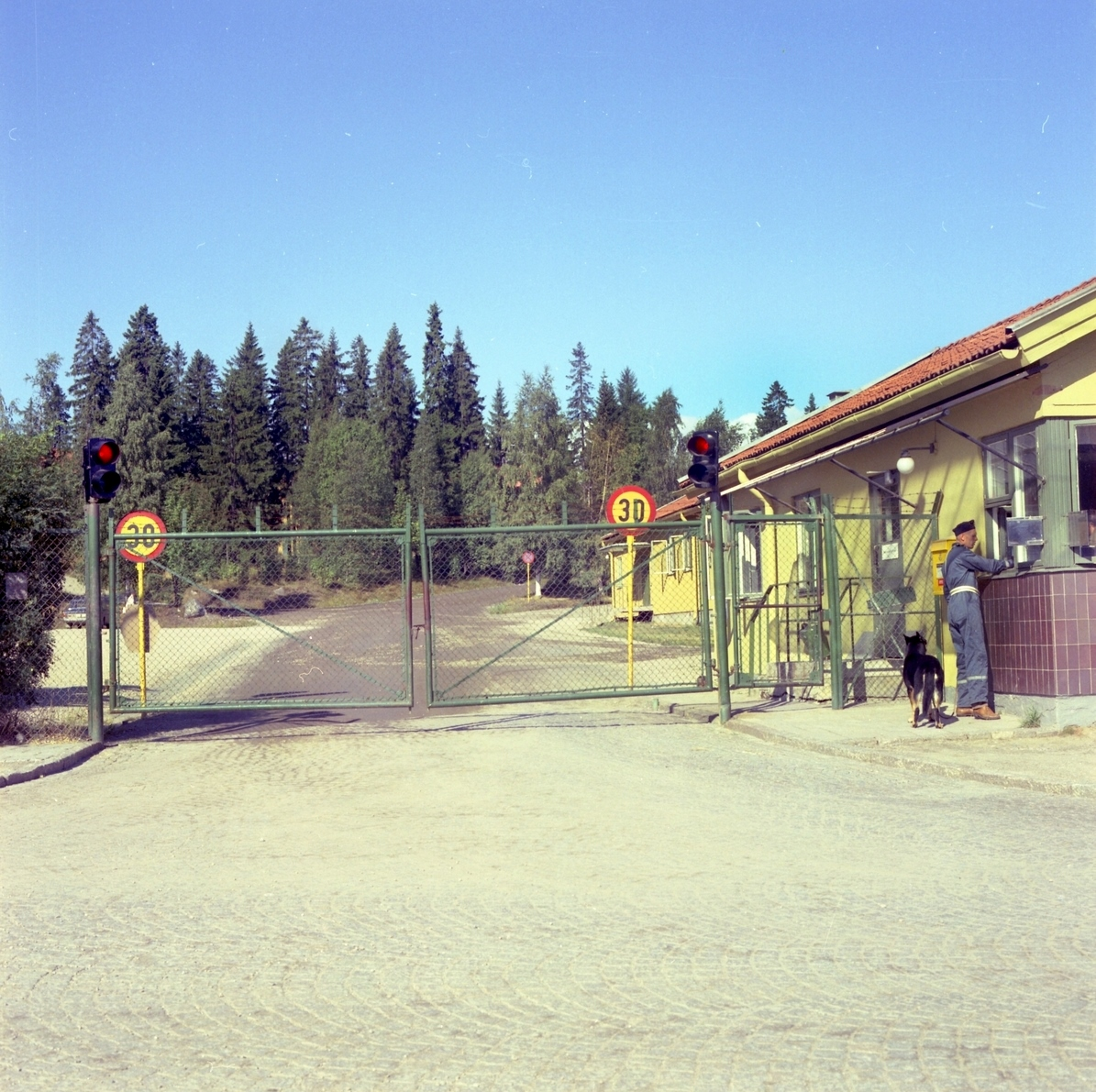
Guardhouse (1968)

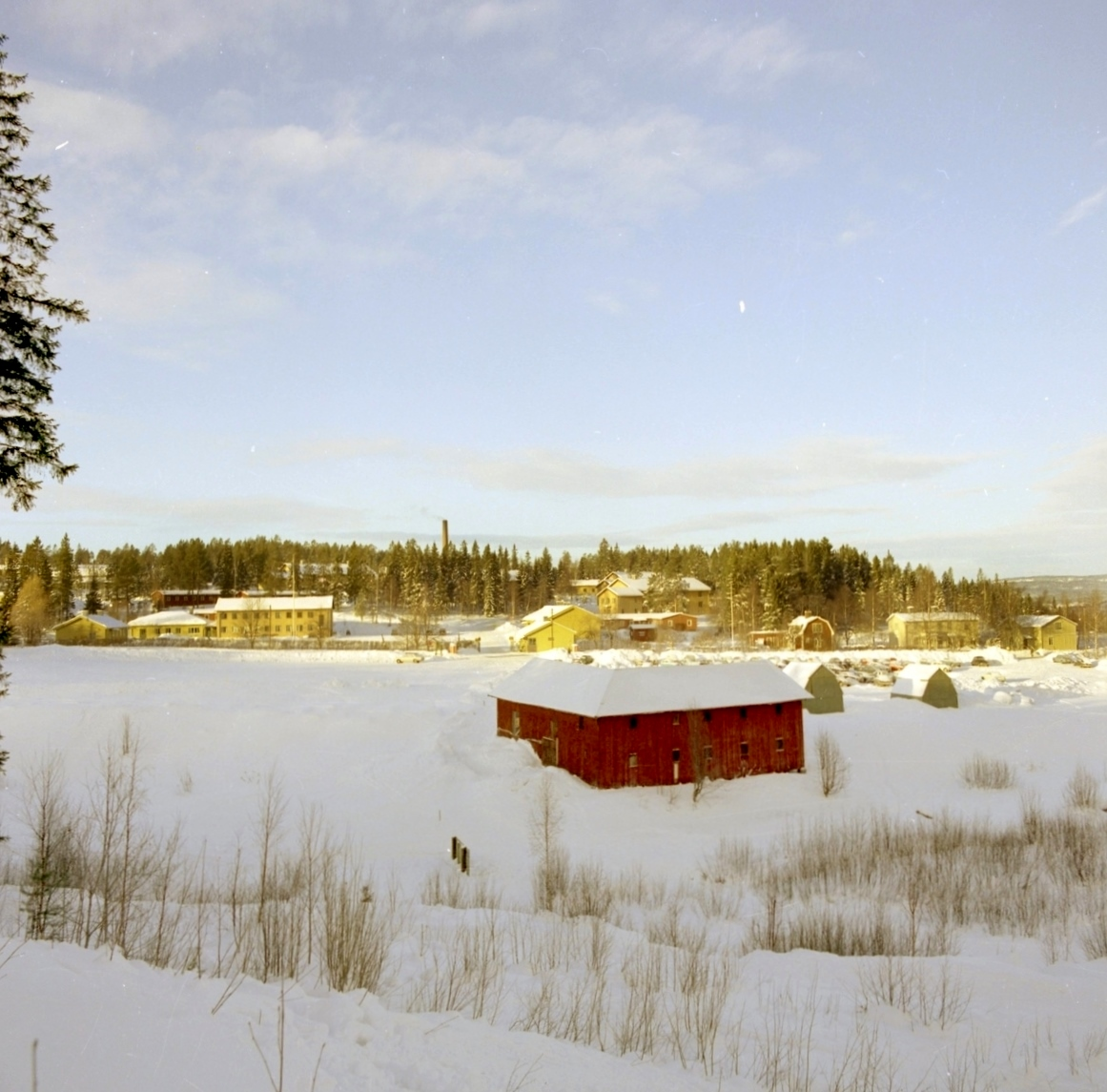
Buildings (1968)

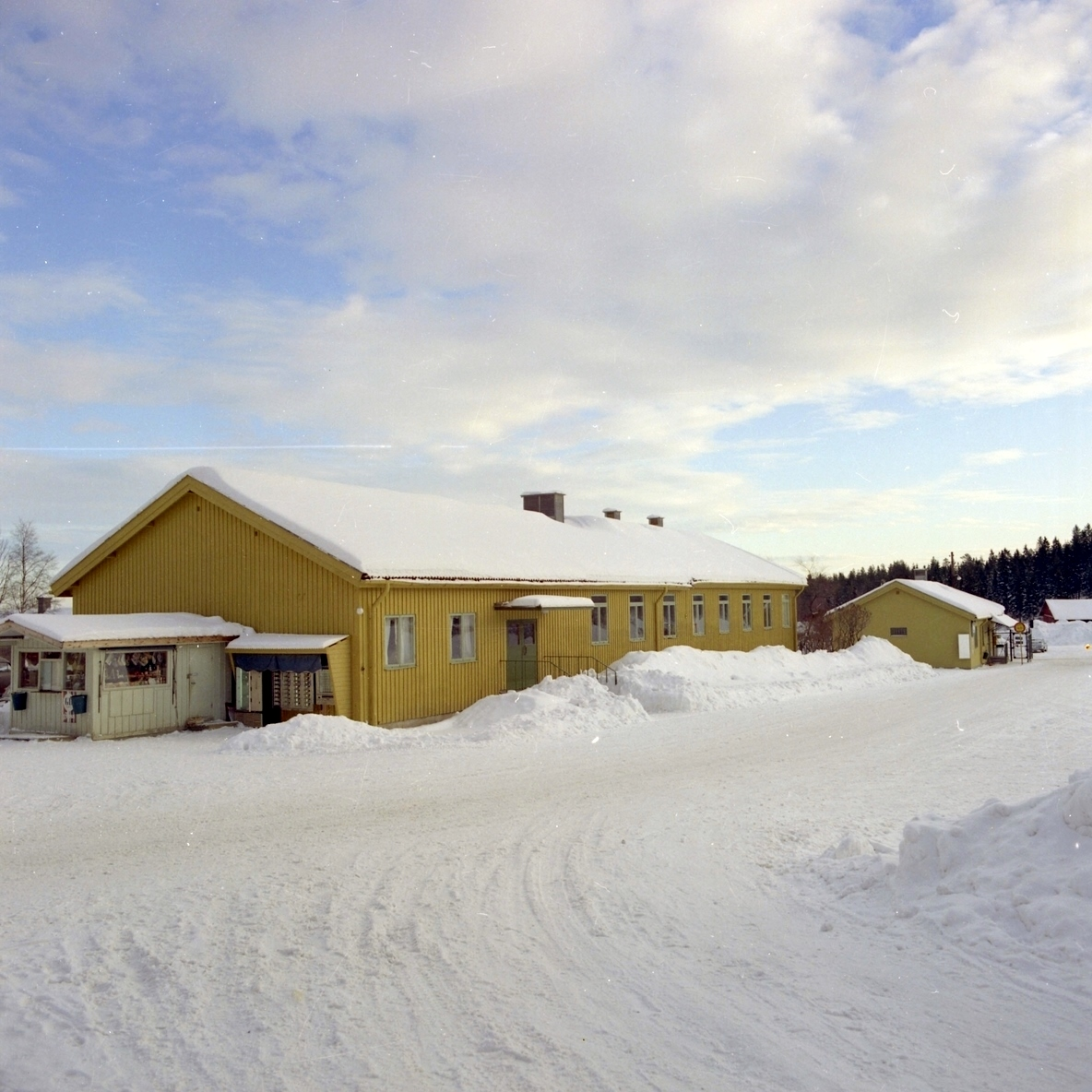
School building (1968)

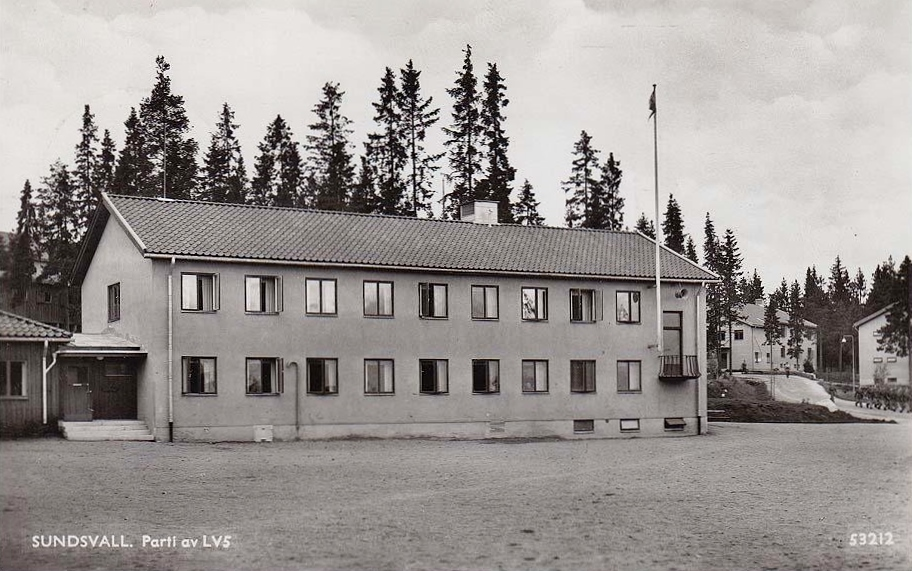
Chancellery building

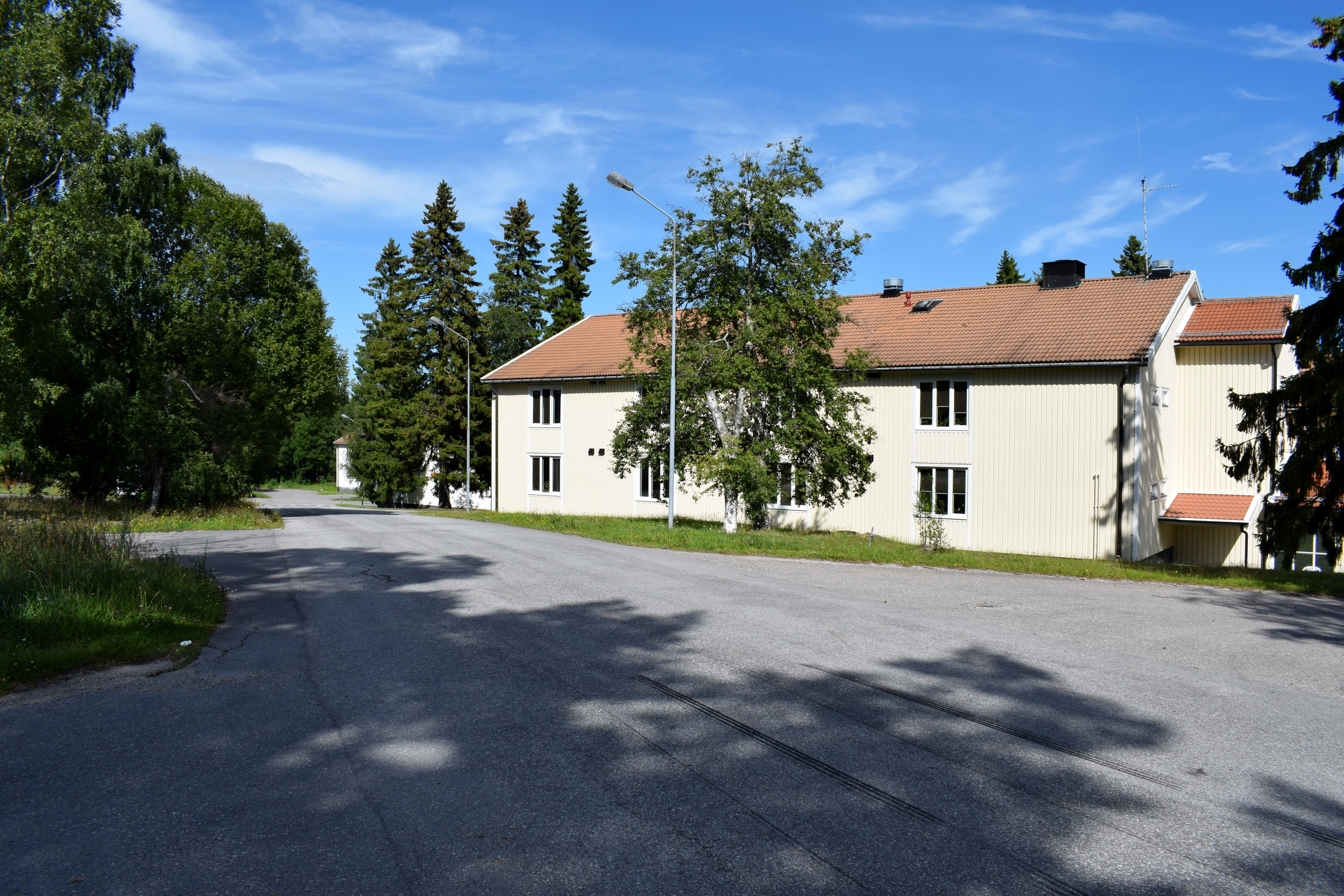
Barracks (2020)

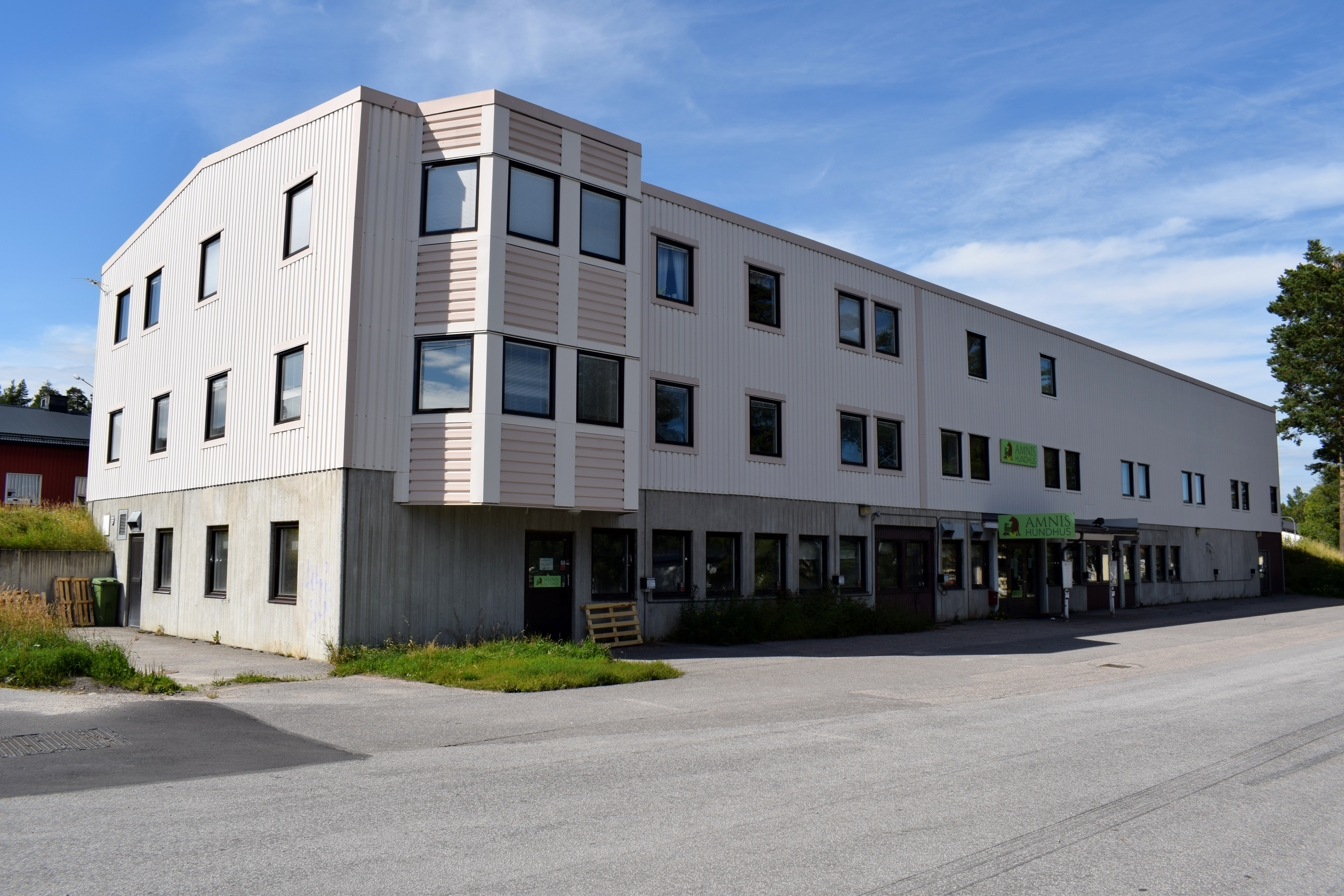
Former artillery hall (2020)

=== Training areas ===
The unit had its training sites east and south of the road to Södra Stadsberget, as well as at Åstön training area and Tynderö.

== Heraldry and traditions ==
=== Coat of arms ===
The coat of arms of the unit was used from 1977 to 1982. Blazon: "Argent, the town badge of Sundsvall, two musket forks in saltire under a helmet, all azure. The shield surmounted two gunbarrels of older pattern in saltire and two wings, both or".

=== Colours, standards and guidons ===
The unit standard was presented on 6 June 1943 by the military commander of the II Military District, Major General Helge Jung. The embroideries have been transferred to new cloth before 1970. The work done by Libraria (probably). Color light blue. It was handed over to the Swedish Army Museum on 2 November 1982 and later deposited to the Air Defence Regiment (Lv 6).

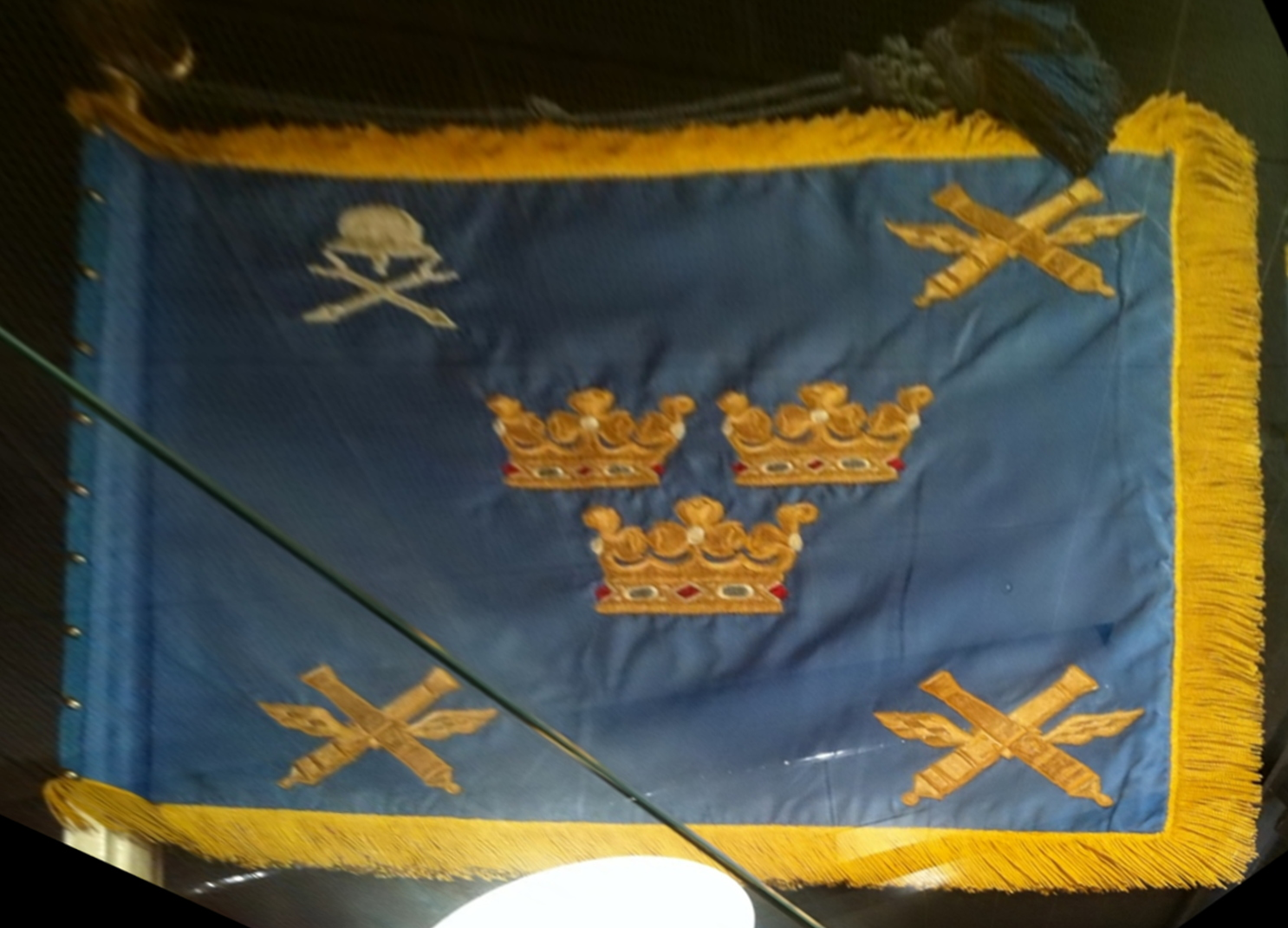
Standard

=== Traditions ===
In 1982, Lv 5 Kamratförening ("Lv 5 Friendship Association") was formed, which had the purpose of being a cohesive link for personnel and conscripts at Sundsvall Anti-Aircraft Regiment. From 1 January 2015, the association ceased to exist, due to the lack of growth for the association. The last chairman of the association was Bert Blomqvist.

On 9 April 2019, a new museum housed at Södra berget's hostel at the old barracks establishment was inaugurated. The museum is intended to reflect the history of the Sundsvall Anti-Aircraft Regiment and the area.

== Commanding officers ==
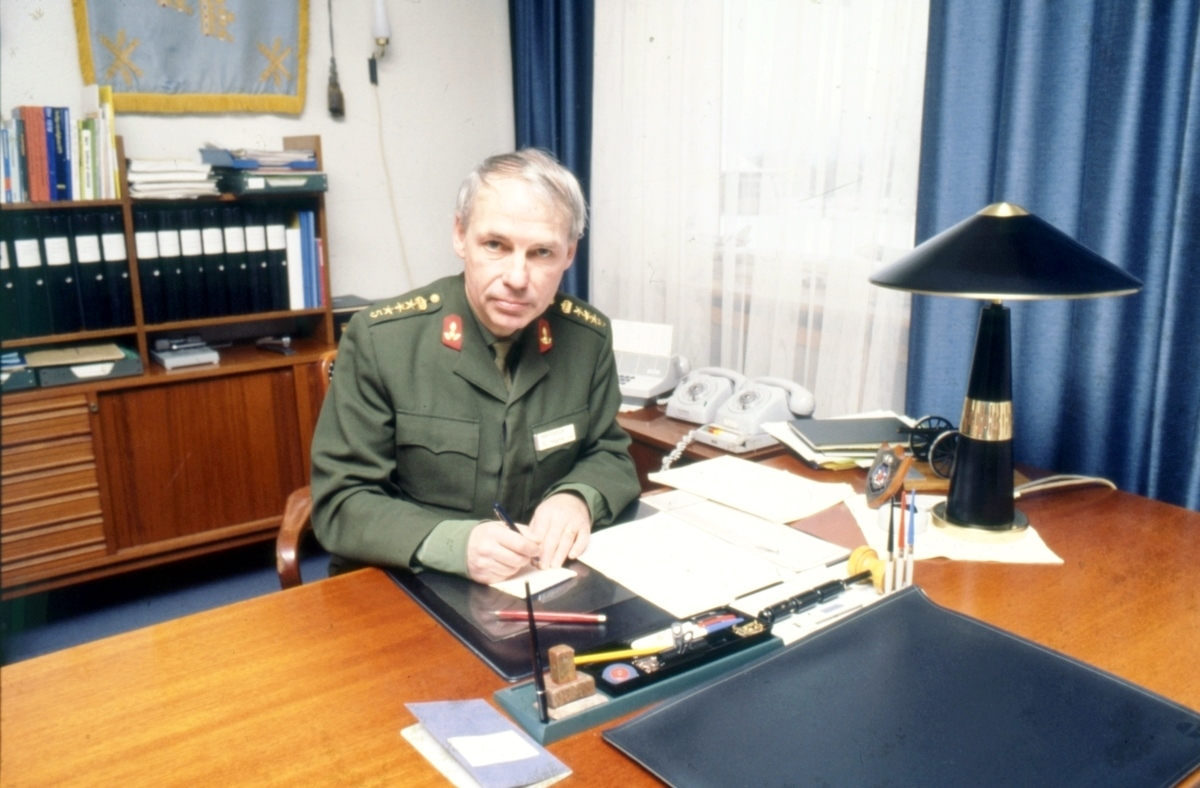
Colonel Lars Mårtensson, commander of Lv 5 from 1975 to 1979.

Commanding officers between 1940 and 1982:

- 1940–1942: Bertil Bredberg
- 1942–1951: Erik Rudberg
- 1951–1958: Gert Beckman
- 1958–1968: Bertil Bredberg
- 1968–1975: Åke Skarp
- 1975–1979: Lars Mårtensson
- 1979–1982: Sven Sjölander

== Names, designations and locations ==
Name	Translation	From		To
Kungl. Norrlands artilleriregemente detachement i Sundsvall	Royal Norrland Artillery Regiment's Detachment in Sundsvall	1940-06-??	–	1940-07-??
Utbildningscentral Sundsvall	Training Center Sundsvall	1940-07-??	–	1940-10-03
Kungl. Östgöta luftvärnsartilleriregemente detachement i Sundsvall	Royal Östgöta Anti-Aircraft Artillery Regiment's Detachment in Sundsvall	1940-10-04	–	1941-09-30
Kungl. Sundsvalls luftvärnsdivision	Royal Sundsvall Anti-Aircraft Division	1941-10-01	–	1942-09-30
Kungl. Sundsvalls luftvärnskår	Royal Sundsvall Anti-Aircraft Corps	1942-10-01	–	1974-06-30
Kungl. Sundsvalls luftvärnsregementet	Royal Sundsvall Anti-Aircraft Regiment	1974-07-01	–	1974-12-31
Sundsvalls luftvärnsregemente	Sundsvall Anti-Aircraft Regiment	1975-01-01	–	1982-06-30
Avvecklingsorganisation	Decommissioning Organisation	1982-07-01	–	1982-12-31
Designation		From		To
Lv A 4		1940-06-??	–	1940-07-??
Utbc A 4		1940-07-??	–	1940-10-03
A 10 Su		1940-10-04	–	1942-09-30
Lv 5		1942-10-01	–	1982-06-30
Location		From		To
Sundsvall Garrison		1940-06-??	–	1982-12-31

== See also ==
- List of Swedish anti-aircraft regiments
