= Norrland Anti-Aircraft Battalion =

Swedish military unit

Coordinates: 65°49′13.8″N 21°39′18.5″E

- Norrlands luftvärnsbataljon
- Active: 1942–2004
- Country: Sweden
- Allegiance: Swedish Armed Forces
- Branch: Swedish Army
- Type: Anti-aircraft
- Size: Battalion
- Part of: VI.milo (1942–1966); Milo ÖN (1966–1993); Milo N (1993–2000); I 19 (2000–2004)
- Garrison/HQ: Boden
- Colors: White and red
- March: "Takt och ton" (Grundström) (Note: The marsch was adopted in 1949 and was established in 1953 by Army Order 33/1953. The marsch was established again on 27 November 2002.)

Insignia
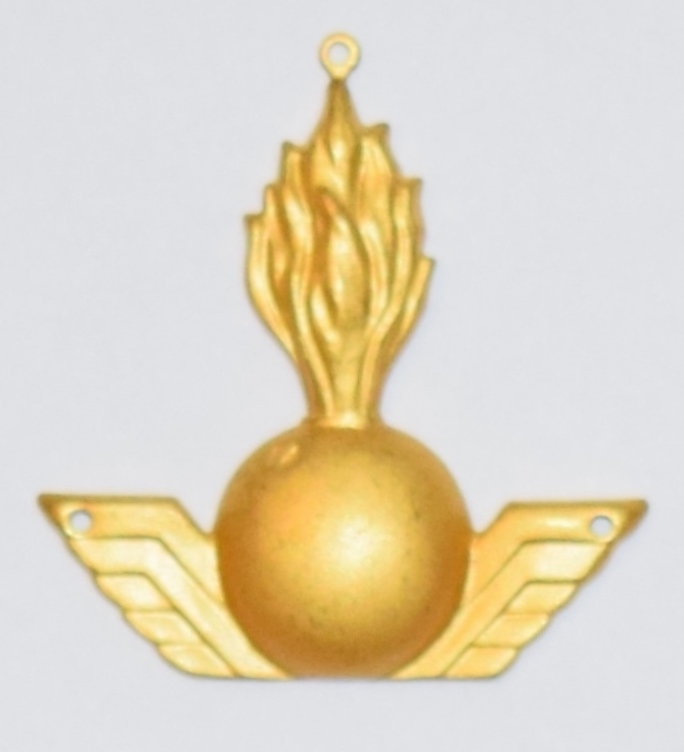
- Branch insignia

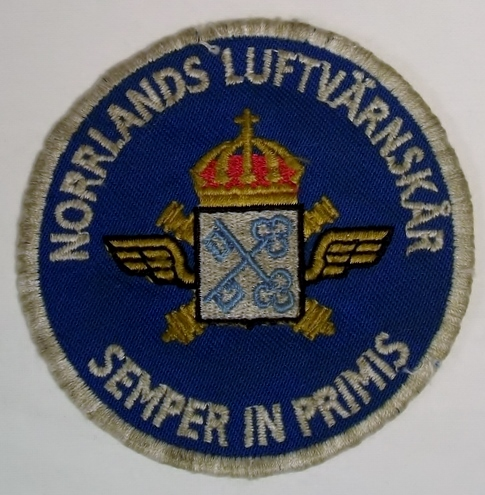
- Patch

Norrland Anti-Aircraft Battalion (Swedish: Norrlands luftvärnsbataljon, Lvbat/I 19), originally Luleå Anti-Aircraft Corps (Swedish: Luleå luftvärnskår, Lv 7) was a Swedish Army anti-aircraft unit that operated between 1942 and 2004. The unit was based in Luleå and Boden Garrison.

== History ==
Through the Defence Act of 1936, the air defense was given a more independent role in the Swedish artillery, which among other things resulted in a number of anti-aircraft divisions being organized, where, among other things, a division was relocated to Luleå. The division was raised as a preparedness division of Karlsborg Anti-Aircraft Artillery Regiment (A 9) on 1 October 1941 under the name Luleå Anti-Aircraft Division (A 9 L). Through the Defence Act of 1942, it was decided to separate the air defense from the artillery, to form its own corps. The change resulted, among other things, in the Luleå Anti-Aircraft Division being separated from Karlsborg Anti-Aircraft Artillery Regiment, and formed on 1 October 1942 the Luleå Anti-Aircraft Corps (Lv 7). The corps was initially temporarily housed in a barracks camp at Rektorsgatan in Luleå, where it operated until 14 August 1944 when the corps began to move into a newly built barracks area at Brändövägen (later the Kronan neighborhood), and from 1 September 1944 it operated officially from its new barracks area. On 11 March 1945, a ceremony was held over the move.

In connection with the OLLI reform which was carried out in the Swedish Armed Forces in 1973 and 1975, Boden Artillery Regiment (A 8) was amalgamated with Boden Defence District (Bodens försvarsområde, Fo 63) and in 1975 formed the defence district regiment (försvarsområdesregemente), A 8/Fo 63. This meant that Luleå Anti-Aircraft Corps which was part of Boden Defence District came to become a B unit (training regiment), and its mobilization and materiel responsibility was transferred to Boden Artillery Regiment, which became an A unit (defence district regiment). At the same time, the corps was reorganized into a regiment on 1 July 1975, and was renamed the Luleå Anti-Aircraft Regiment (Lv 7).

Through a Defense Inquiry of 1988, the Swedish government proposed in its bill, among other things, a relocation of the Luleå Anti-Aircraft Regiment to Boden Garrison. The background to the proposal was to achieve savings, but also to increase the opportunities for joint practice and joint training. Prior to the bill, the Defense Committee had investigated a relocation of the regiment to Norrbotten Wing (F 21). This is in order to investigate the financial possibilities of retaining the regiment in Luleå. However, a co-location with Norrbotten Wing would entail a large investment cost. Therefore, they were considered the most economical to relocate the regiment to Boden. When the Defense Committee considered that the financial savings would be of such a magnitude that the facility in Luleå should be closed down. The relocation of the Anti-Aircraft Regiment would be fully completed by 1 July 1992. On 1 May 1992, the regiment had been relocated to Boden. In Boden, the regiment was co-located with Norrbotten Regiment with Norrbotten Armored Battalion (I 19/P 5). The old barracks area that was left in Luleå was transformed into a business park and cultural village under the name Kronan.

Through the Defence Act of 1992, it was decided that all training regiments that did not raise war units the size of a regiment, would not be called a regiment either. This was because the government considered that the basic organization should reflect the war organization. In connection with this, the regiment was reduced to a corps on 1 July 1993, and adopted the name Norrland Anti-Aircraft Corps (Lv 7). Through the Defence Act of 2000, the government considered that only four anti-aircraft battalions were needed in the future rapid reaction organisation (insatsorganisation). What was clear before the Defence Act was to disband Gotland Anti-Aircraft Corps (Lv 2) and reduce Norrland Anti-Aircraft Corps (Lv 7) to a battalion and place it under Norrbotten Regiment (I 19). This was because the activities at Gotland Anti-Aircraft Corps were considered too limited to be able to develop into a single unit for the country's air defense. Regarding Norrland Anti-Aircraft Corps, the government judged that it would give serious competence losses in the short term to locate the entire air defense function to Boden.

With the Defence Act, the training of the air defense was concentrated in four anti-aircraft battalions, three in Halmstad and Norrland Anti-Aircraft Battalion. As the Göta Anti-Aircraft Corps became a unified unit for the country's air defense, containing three anti-aircraft battalions and the Air Defence Combat School (Luftvärnets stridsskola, LvSS), the Göta Anti-Aircraft Corps was elevated to a regiment, and on 1 July 2000 adopted the new name Air Defence Regiment (Lv 6). On 30 June 2000, Norrland Anti-Aircraft Corps was disbanded as an independent unit. From 1 July 2000, the anti-aircraft battalion was incorporated as a training battalion in Norrbotten Regiment (I 19). The new battalion adopted the name Norrland Anti-Aircraft Battalion (Lvbat/I 19). The battalion consisted of a battalion staff, an anti-aircraft company and a staff company. According to the Defence Act, the activities of the battalion would, as far as possible, be a mirror image of the Air Defence Regiment (Lv 6) but on a smaller scale.

Prior to the Defence Act of 2004, the government proposed that Norrland Engineer Battalion should be disbanded. Against this background, it was considered that all air defense training should be gathered at the Air Defence Regiment in Halmstad, in order to achieve a rational training volume for the air defense function. The ability to behave in a subarctic environment was downgraded rather than creating a rationalizing educational volume. Instead, the government believed that the subarctic capability within the air defense could be maintained partly with parts of the officer corps, partly within the framework of the Swedish Armed Forces' Winter Unit (Försvarsmaktens vinterenhet, FMVE) in Boden. The Riksdag adopted the government's proposal, and according to the Defence Act, Norrland Anti-Aircraft Battalion together with Norrland Engineer Battalion and Norrland Signal Battalion were disbanded. The battalion was disbanded on 31 December 2004, and from 1 January 2005 the battalion was transferred to a disbandment organization until the disbandment was completed by 30 June 2006. On 23 May 2005, a joint decommissioning ceremony was held for the battalions in Boden that were affected by the Defence Act. The ceremony was held at the Norrbotten Regiment's barracks yard.

== Locations and training areas ==
=== Barracks ===
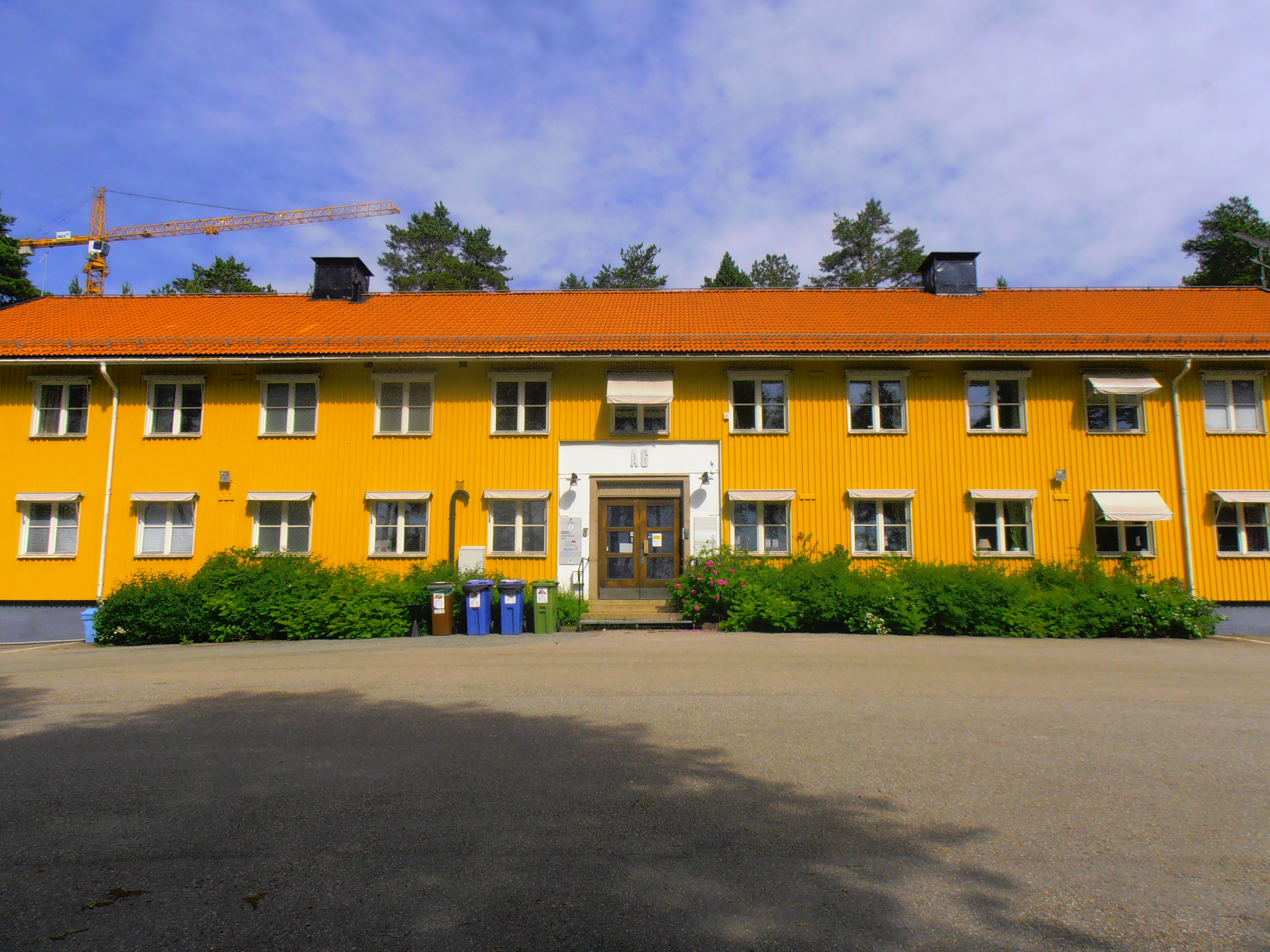
Officer's Building at Kronan, Luleå.

In connection with the Karlsborg Anti-Aircraft Regiment (Lv 1) detaching a preparedness division on 20 June 1941 to Boden, the detachment was relocated to Boden Artillery Regiment's barracks at Åbergsleden. On 1 October 1941, the detachment was transferred to Luleå, and placed in a barracks camp at Rektorsgatan. After the detachment was separated from the regiment on 1 October 1942 and formed the Luleå Anti-Aircraft Corps (Lv 7), the corps began moving into a new barracks area at Brändövägen from 14 August 1944. A moving-in ceremony was held at the new barracks area on 11 March 1945. On 1 May 1992, the unit was relocated to Boden, where it was co-located with Norrbotten Regiment with Norrbotten Armored Battalion (I 19/P 5) at Norrbottensvägen.

=== Training areas ===
The unit had its training areas at Brändön between the years 1942 and 1946 and from 1946 at Tåme training area.

== Heraldry and traditions ==
=== Coat of arms ===
The coat of arms of the unit was used from 1977 to 2004. Blazon: "Argent, the town badge of Luleå, två keys azure in saltire, sinister inverted. The shield surmounted two gunbarrels of older pattern in saltire and two wings, both or."

=== Colours, standards and guidons ===
The unit standard was presented to the then Royal Luleå Anti-Aircraft Corps (Lv 7) in Luleå by the commander of the VI Military District, Major General Nils Roslund in 1943. It was used as unit standard by Lv 7 until 1 July 2000. The standard is drawn by Brita Grep and embroidered by hand in insertion technique by the Kedja studio, Heraldica. Blazon: "On blue cloth in the centre the lesser coat of arms of Sweden, three open yellow crowns placed two and one. In the first corner the town badge of Luleå; two white keys, the left inverted (the original name of the battalion was Luleå Anti-Aircraft Corps). In the other corners two winged yellow gunbarrels of older pattern in saltire. Yellow fringe."

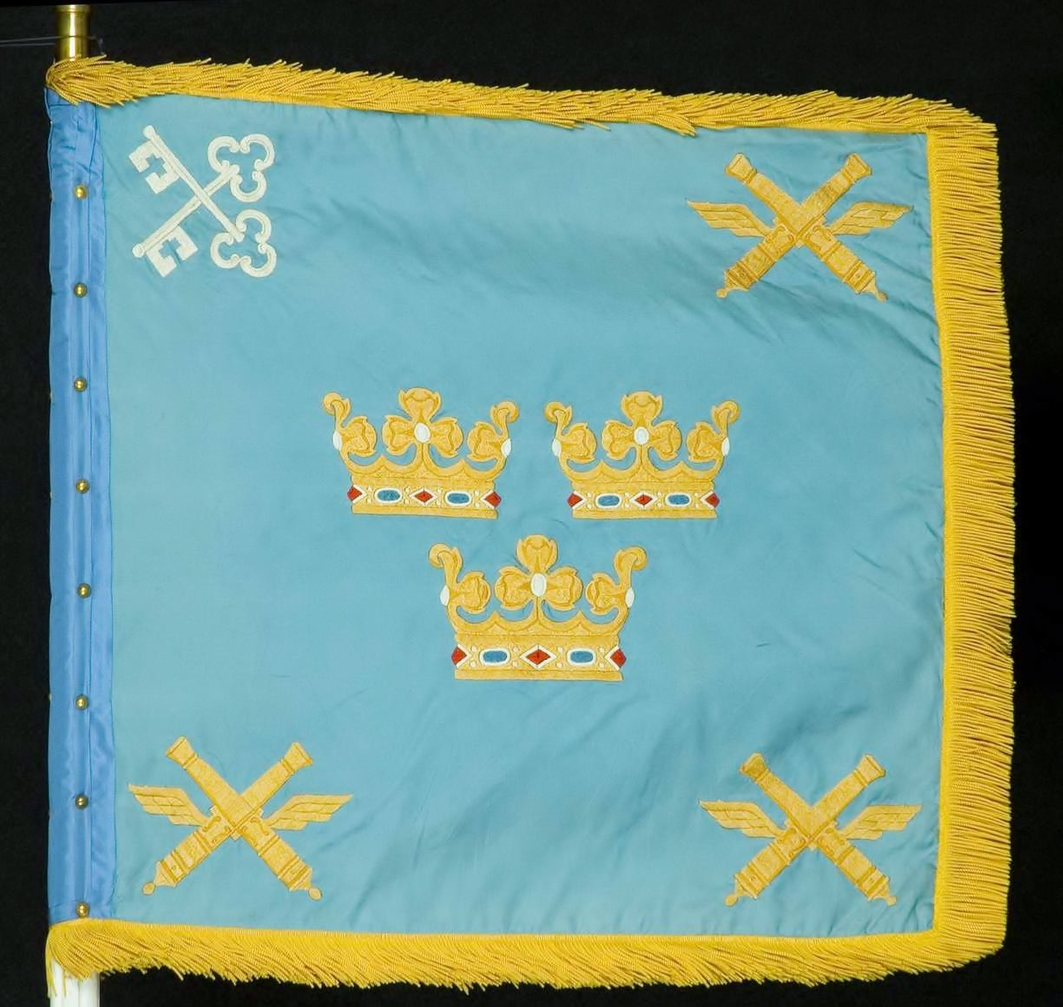
Standard

=== Medals ===
In 2000, the Norrlands luftvärnskårs (Lv 7) minnesmedalj ("Norrland Anti-Aircraft Corps (Lv 7) Commemorative Medal") in silver (NorrllvkSMM) of the 8th size was established. The medal ribbon is of white moiré with a red stripe on each side.

== Commanding officer ==
- 1942–1948: Niels Juel
- 1948–1953: Sven Tilly
- 1953–1957: Nils Kahlén
- 1957–1966: Gösta Leijon
- 1966–1968: Carl Herlitz
- 1968–1976: Kurt Johansson
- 1976–1978: Sven Platerud
- 1978–1981: Erik Albertsson
- 1981–1989: Lars Brunnberg
- 1989–1992: Gunnar Widh
- 1992–1994: Claes Sundin
- 1994–1997: Claes-Göran Fant
- 1997–2000: Roger Kempainen
- 2000–2000: Hans Uhlander
- 2000–2000: Kurt Högström
- 2000–2001: Peter Bergström
- 2001–2005: Ove Tirud

== Names, designations and locations ==
Name	Translation	From		To
Kungl. Luleå luftvärnskår	Royal Luleå Anti-Aircraft Corps	1942-10-01	–	1974-12-31
Luleå luftvärnskår	Luleå Anti-Aircraft Corps	1975-01-01	–	1975-06-30
Luleå luftvärnsregemente	Luleå Anti-Aircraft Regiment	1975-07-01	–	1993-06-30
Norrlands luftvärnskår	Norrland Anti-Aircraft Corps	1993-07-01	–	2000-06-30
Norrlands luftvärnsbataljon	Norrland Anti-Aircraft Battalion	2000-07-01	–	2004-12-31
Avvecklingsorganisation	Decommissioning Organisation	2005-01-01	–	2006-06-30
Designation		From		To
Lv 7		1942-10-01	–	2000-06-30
Lvbat/I 19		2000-07-01	–	2004-12-31
Location		From		To
Luleå Garrison		1942-10-01	–	1992-04-30
Boden Garrison		1992-05-01	–	2006-06-30

== See also ==
- List of Swedish anti-aircraft regiments
