= Östgöta Anti-Aircraft Regiment =

- Östgöta luftvärnsregemente
- Active: 1938–1962
- Country: Sweden
- Allegiance: Swedish Armed Forces
- Branch: Swedish Army
- Type: Artillery (1938–1941); Anti-aircraft (1941–1962)
- Size: Regiment
- Part of: IV Army Division (1938–1942); IV Military District (1942–1962)
- Garrison/HQ: Linköping
- Colors: Red and yellow
- March: "Östgöta luftvärnsregementes marsch" (Rösell) (Note: The march was established in 1953 by Army Order 33/1953.)

Insignia
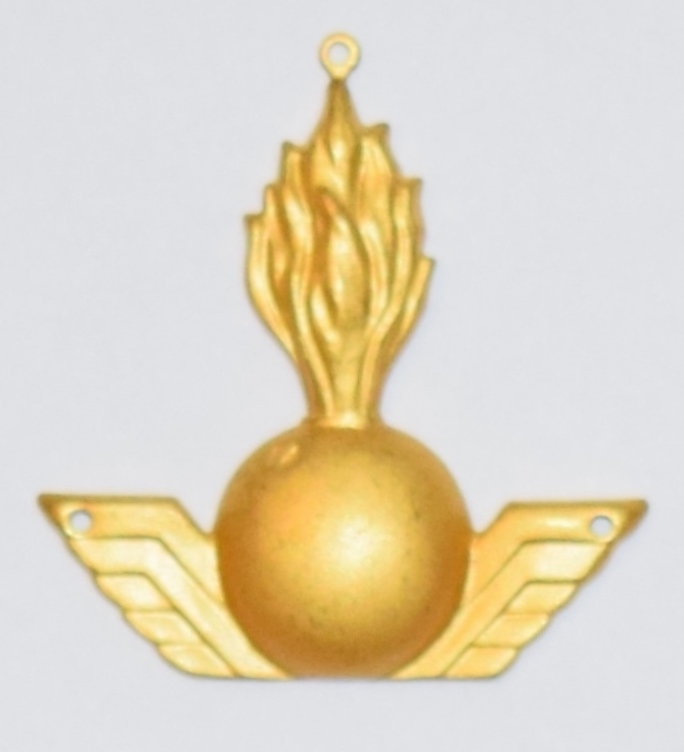
- Branch insignia

Östgöta Anti-Aircraft Regiment (Swedish: Östgöta luftvärnsregemente), also Lv 2, was a Swedish Army anti-aircraft unit that was active in various forms between 1938–1962. The unit was based in Linköping.

== History ==
The Östgöta Anti-Aircraft Regiment was raised on 1 October 1939, but already a year earlier, on 1 October 1938, a preparatory organization had been formed, which was added to the eastern barracks at the twin establishment in Linköping. The barracks had originally been built in 1922 for the 2nd Life Grenadier Regiment (I 5), which was later disbanded. The first conscripts in the regiment moved in on 9 March 1939, and were distributed on four anti-aircraft batteries.

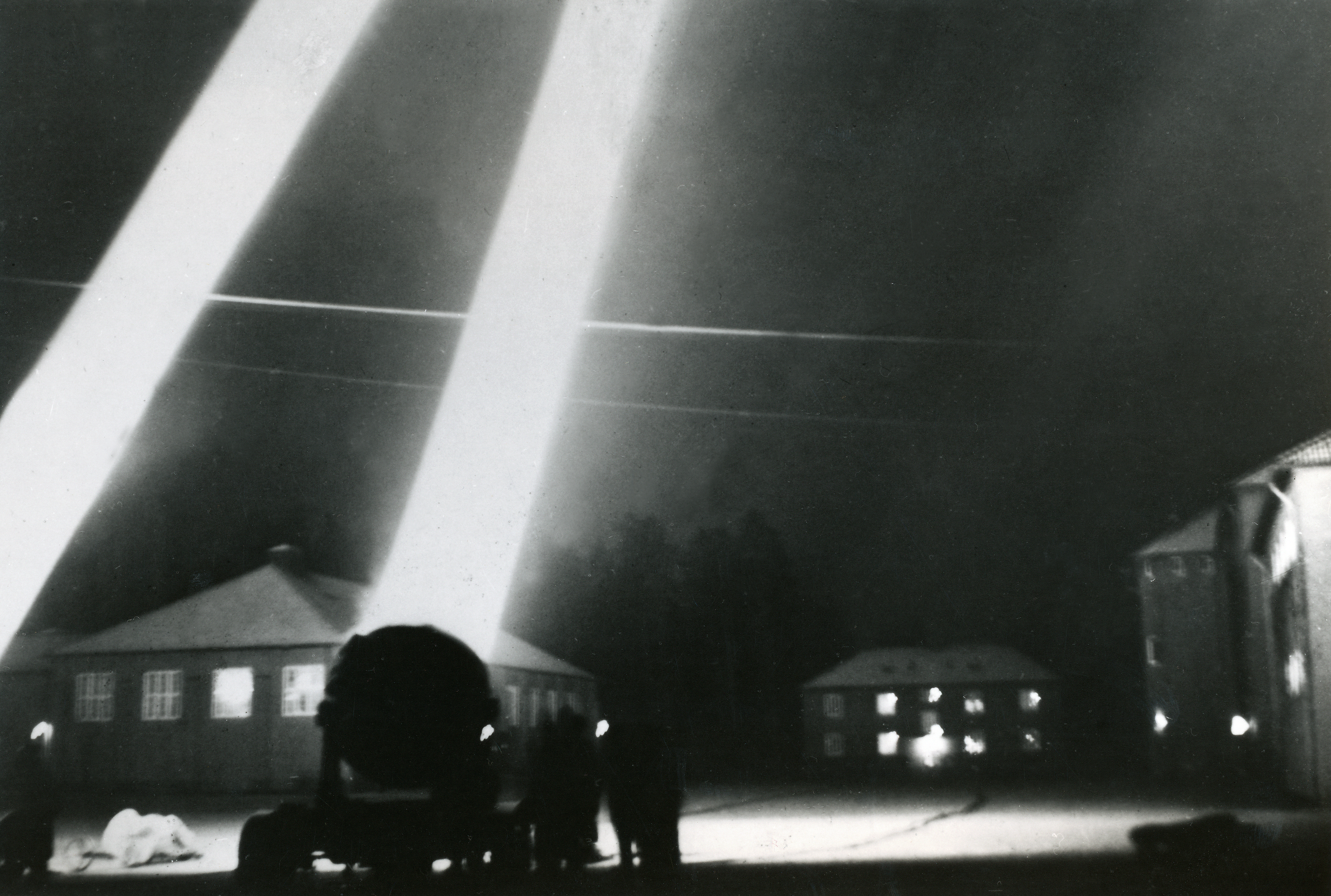
Training with 150 cm anti-aircraft searchlights in December 1939.

Through the Defence Act of 1936, the air defense took on a more independent role in the artillery, which resulted in, among other things, a number of anti-aircraft divisions being organized. The Östgöta Anti-Aircraft Regiment was one of the regiments that during the years 1939-1942 came to be the foundation for a number of air defense units. From 1939 to 1941, a detachment from the regiment was placed in Stockholm, which was called the Östgöta Anti-Aircraft Regiment's Detachment in Stockholm (A 10 S). In 1941, the detachment in Stockholm was separated and formed an independent regiment under the name Stockholm Anti-Aircraft Regiment (A 11). Between 1940 and 1942, the regiment organized preparedness divisions for the air defense of Sundsvall and Malmö. In 1941, these two preparedness divisions were reorganized into Sundsvall Anti-Aircraft Division (A 10 Su) and Malmö Anti-Aircraft Division (A 10 M).

Through the Defence Act of 1942, it was decided to separate the air defense from the artillery, to form its own branch, the Swedish Air Defense Troops (Luftvärnstrupperna). The change resulted in the regiment being assigned a new designation, Östgöta Anti-Aircraft Regiment (Lv 2). But also that the detachments in Malmö and Sundsvall were separated from the regiment and formed independent units, the Scanian Anti-Aircraft Corps (Lv 4) and Sundsvall Anti-Aircraft Corps (Lv 5). In 1952, the Stockholm Anti-Aircraft Regiment (Lv 3) was relocated to Norrtälje, which resulted in Östgöta Anti-Aircraft Regiment taking over responsibility for the Stockholm Anti-Aircraft Regiment's Battery on Gotland (Lv 3 G). The detachment came with the organizational change being renamed to Östgöta Anti-Aircraft Regiment's Battery on Gotland (Lv 2 G).

Prior to the Defence Act of 1958, the Swedish government proposed to the Riksdag that Östgöta Anti-Aircraft Regiment should be disbanded and its training contingent allocated to the remaining air defense units. The background to the proposal was that the total training contingent in the air defense was needed to be reduced, to meet the needs of the war organization. It was proposed that the Östgöta Anti-Aircraft Regiment be disbanded as a peacetime unit, because the Swedish Army wanted to transfer Svea Artillery Regiment to Linköping. This as a further background to the fact that there was a desire to reduce the number of peacetime units in the Stockholm region. In the Linköping region, the Svea Artillery Regiment would have better training opportunities through the planned new Gullberg training area. In the 1959 Riksdag, the government believed that in particularly vulnerable parts of the country peacetime units would be maintained. This led, among other things, to exempting the Östgöta Anti-Aircraft Regiment's Battery on Gotland (Lv 2 G) for investigation for decommissioning. On 18 March 1962, a decommissioning ceremony was held at the regiment, and on 31 March 1962, the regiment was disbanded. The regiment, however, survived for just over a year, when it transitioned from 1 April 1962, to a decommissioning organization called Lv 2 A. The decommissioning organization continued to train conscripts until 31 March 1963.

== Units ==
- Swedish Army Anti-Aircraft Cadet School (Luftvärnets kadettskola, LvKS) initially named the Swedish Army Anti-Aircraft Officer Candidate School (Luftvärnets officersaspirantskola, LvOAS), was relocated from Karlsborg to Linköping on 20 October 1939, and transferred to the 6th barracks. On 29 September 1943, the school returned to Karlsborg, returning to Linköping a year later, on 3 October 1944. On 28 September 1945, the school was reorganized into the Swedish Army Anti-Aircraft Cadet School. On 1 January 1962, the school changed its name again to the Swedish Army Anti-Aircraft [Cadet and] Officer Candidate School (Luftvärnets kadett- och aspirantskola, LvKAS). When the Östgöta Anti-Aircraft Regiment was disbanded on 31 March 1962, the school belonged to the Decommissioning Organisation that remained in Linköping. The school was later relocated on 1 September 1962, to Göta Anti-Aircraft Regiment (Lv 6) in Gothenburg where it remained until 1991, when it was amalgamated into the Swedish Army Anti-Aircraft Center (Arméns luftvärnscentrum, LvC) in Norrtälje.
- Östgöta Anti-Aircraft Regiment's Battery on Gotland (Östgöta luftvärnsregementes batteri på Gotland, Lv 2 G) was an anti-aircraft unit raised in 1944 as a detachment to the Stockholm Anti-Aircraft Regiment. In connection with the relocation of the Stockholm Anti-Aircraft Regiment to Norrtälje, the detachment was transferred organizationally to Östgöta Anti-Aircraft Regiment. After the Östgöta Anti-Aircraft Regiment was disbanded, its unit designation and traditions were taken over by Gotland Anti-Aircraft Division.

== Locations and training areas ==
=== Barracks ===
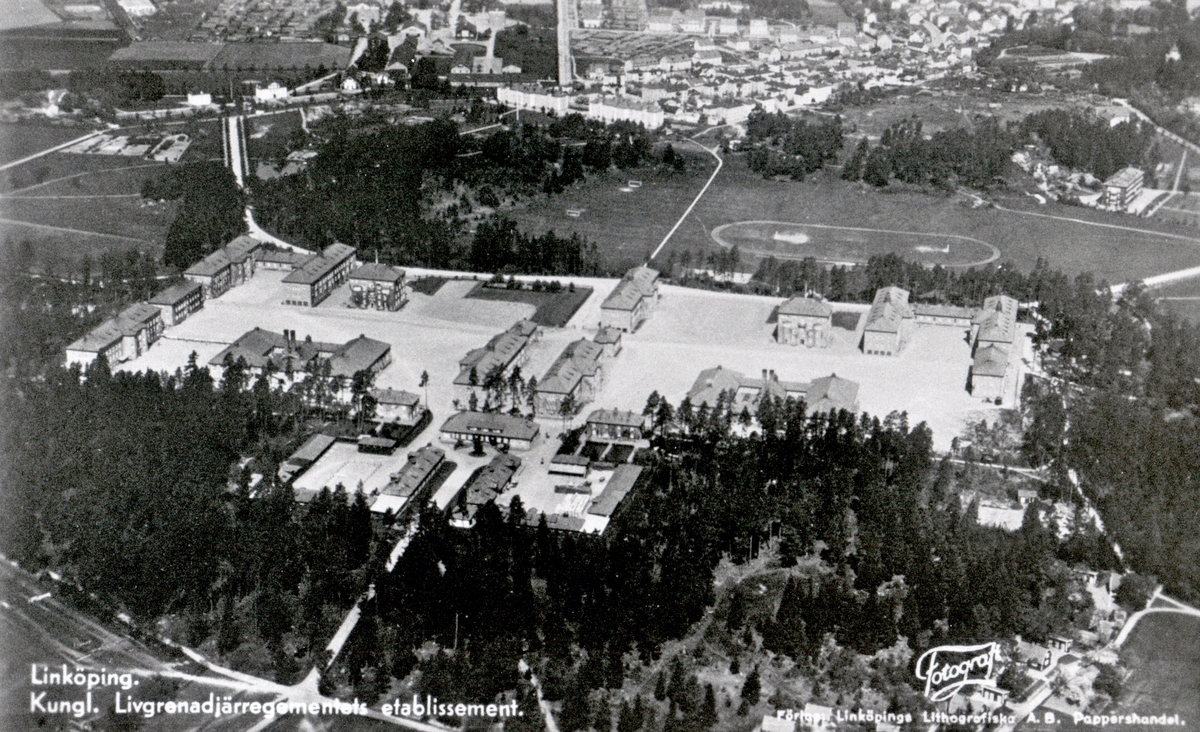
Aerial photograph of the double barracks area in 1930.

When Östgöta Anti-Aircraft Regiment was raised, the regiment was placed on the eastern part of the double barracks area that had originally been built for the 1st Life Grenadier Regiment, which was erected after the 1901 Army Order's building program after the Kasernbyggnadsnämnden ("Barracks Building Committee") second type drawing series for infantry establishments. The two barracks areas were separated by a road, and were basically a mirror image of each other, with their own canteen, their own storage room, their own hospital and their respective mess and so on. In the eastern part of the double barracks area, an anti-aircraft school was located. Through the Defence Act of 1958, it was decided that the Östgöta Anti-Aircraft Regiment should be disbanded, which resulted in the anti-aircraft school being relocated to Gothenburg Garrison. In compensation for the garrison, it was decided in the same Defence Act that Svea Artillery Regiment should be placed in Linköping. Svea Artillery Regiment was moved from Rissne, Sundbyberg to Linköping in the spring of 1963, and took over the barracks in the eastern part. In 1997, all the remaining units in the garrison were disbanded, and the double barracks area was sold to the state real estate development company Vasallen.

=== Detachments ===
==== Malmö ====
On 1 October 1941, a preparedness division from the regiment, the Malmö Anti-Aircraft Division (A 10 M), was detached to Malmö. The division was located at Gamla Borgarskolan on Repslagargatan. From 1 October 1942, the detachment was separated from the regiment, forming the Scanian Anti-Aircraft Corps (Lv 4).

==== Stockholm ====
On 1 October 1939, a division from the regiment, the Stockholm Anti-Aircraft Division (Stockholms luftvärnsdivision, A 10 S) was detached to Stockholm. The detachment was placed at Göta Life Guards's former barracks on Linnégatan. From 1 October 1941, the detachment was separated from the regiment, forming Stockholm Anti-Air Regiment (A 11).

==== Sundsvall ====
On 4 October 1940, a preparedness division from the regiment, the Sundsvall Anti-Aircraft Division (A 10 Su) was detached to Sundsvall. The division was located at Gustav Adolfsskolan on Södra Järnvägsgatan, as well as with staff at Hotel Knaust on Kyrkogatan and in Tingshuset on Storgatan. From 1 October 1942, the detachment was separated from the regiment, forming Sundsvall Anti-Aircraft Corps (Lv 5).

==== Visby ====
From 1 November 1952, the regiment took over a detachment in Visby, which previously belonged to the Stockholm Anti-Air Regiment (Lv 3). The detachment changed its name from the Stockholm Anti-Air Regiment's Battery on Gotland (Lv 3 G) to Östgöta Anti-Air Regiment's Battery on Gotland (Lv 2 G). The detachment was placed at barracks 2 and 3 at Gotland Artillery Corps (A 7) barracks area at Östra Hansegatan. When the regiment was disbanded, the detachment in Visby became an independent unit under the name Gotland Anti-Aircraft Division (Lv 2).

== Heraldry and traditions ==
=== Colours, standards and guidons ===
On 6 June 1941, the Chief of the Army Lieutenant General Ivar Holmquist presented a standard to the regiment, which was carried by the regiment until it was disbanded on 31 March 1962. The standard was then transferred to the Gotland Battery, which was at the same time reorganized into an independent unit under the name Gotland Anti-Aircraft Division (Lv 2).

=== March and heritage ===
Gotland Anti-Aircraft Division also took over the regiment's march and traditions, and carried them until 31 August 2000. From 1 September 2000, the memory of the regiment is retained by the Air Defence Regiment (Lv 6).

== Commanding officers ==
Regimental commanders active from 1938 to 1961:

- 1938–1941: Jacques Hjalmar de Laval
- 1941–1946: Ragnar Lindblad
- 1946–1948: Richard Åkerman
- 1948–1955: Sten Axel Odelberg
- 1955–1957: Sven Thofelt
- 1957–1961: Olle Rydner
- 1961–1962: Per E:son Frumerie (acting)

== Names, designations and locations ==
Name	Translation	From		To
Kungl. Östgöta luftvärnsartilleriregemente	Royal Östgöta Anti-Aircraft Artillery Regiment	1938-10-01	–	1942-09-30
Kungl. Östgöta luftvärnsregemente	Royal Östgöta Anti-Aircraft Regiment	1942-10-01	–	1962-03-31
Avvecklingsorganisation	Decommissioning Organisation	1962-04-01	–	1963-03-31
Designation		From		To
A 10		1938-10-01	–	1942-09-30
Lv 2		1942-10-01	–	1962-03-31
Lv 2 A		1962-04-01	–	1963-03-31
Location		From		To
Linköping Garrison		1938-10-01	–	1963-03-31

== See also ==
- List of Swedish anti-aircraft regiments
