= Grills =

Grills is the plural of grill. Grills may also refer to:

== People ==
- Caroline Grills (1890–1960), Australian serial killer
- Dave Grills (born 1959), Australian politician
- Lee Grills (1904–1982), Canadian politician
- Leo Grills, known as Lucky Grills (1928–2007), Australian actor and comedian

== Other uses ==
- Grill (jewelry), commonly 'grills'
- Grillz, a 2005 rap song by Nelly
- Grills (comics), a Marvel Comics character

== See also ==
- Grylls, a surname
