= List of Swedish anti-aircraft regiments =

This is a list of Swedish anti-aircraft regiments, battalions, corps and companies that have existed in the Swedish Army.

== By unit ==
- Lv 1 Karlsborgs luftvärnsregemente (1942–1961)
- Lv 2 Östgöta luftvärnsregemente (1942–1962)
- Lv 2 Gotlands luftvärnsdivision (1963–1968)
- Lv 2 Gotlands luftvärnsbataljon (1968–1994)
- Lv 2 Gotlands luftvärnskår (1994–2000)
- Lv 3 Stockholms luftvärnsregemente (1942–1957)
- Lv 3 Roslagens luftvärnsregemente (1957–1994)
- Lv 3 Roslagens luftvärnskår (1994–2000)
- Lv 4 Skånska luftvärnskåren (1942–1962, 1994–1997)
- Lv 4 Skånska luftvärnsregementet (1962–1994)
- Lv 5 Sundsvalls luftvärnskår (1942–1974)
- Lv 5 Sundsvalls luftvärnsregemente (1974–1982)
- Lv 6 Göteborgs luftvärnskår (1942–1962)
- Lv 6 Göta luftvärnsregemente (1962–1994)
- Lv 6 Göta luftvärnskår (1994–2000)
- Lv 6 Luftvärnsregementet (2000– )
- Lv 7 Luleå luftvärnskår (1942–1975)
- Lv 7 Luleå luftvärnsregemente (1975–1993)
- Lv 7 Norrlands luftvärnskår (1993–2000)

== See also ==
- List of Swedish regiments
