= Grylls =

Grylls may refer to:

- Bear Grylls (born 1974), British television presenter and adventurer
- Brendon Grylls (born 1973), Australian politician
- David Grylls (born 1957), American track cyclist
- Karen Grylls (born 1951), New Zealand choral conductor
- Michael Grylls (1934–2001), British politician
- Pinny Grylls, British documentary filmmaker
- Rosalie Glynn Grylls (1905–1988), British biographer, lecturer and politician
- Vaughan Grylls (born 1943), British artist and educationalist

== See also ==
- Burlison and Grylls, English glass manufacturer
- Grills
