= Claes Eric Grill =

Swedish army officer and entomologist

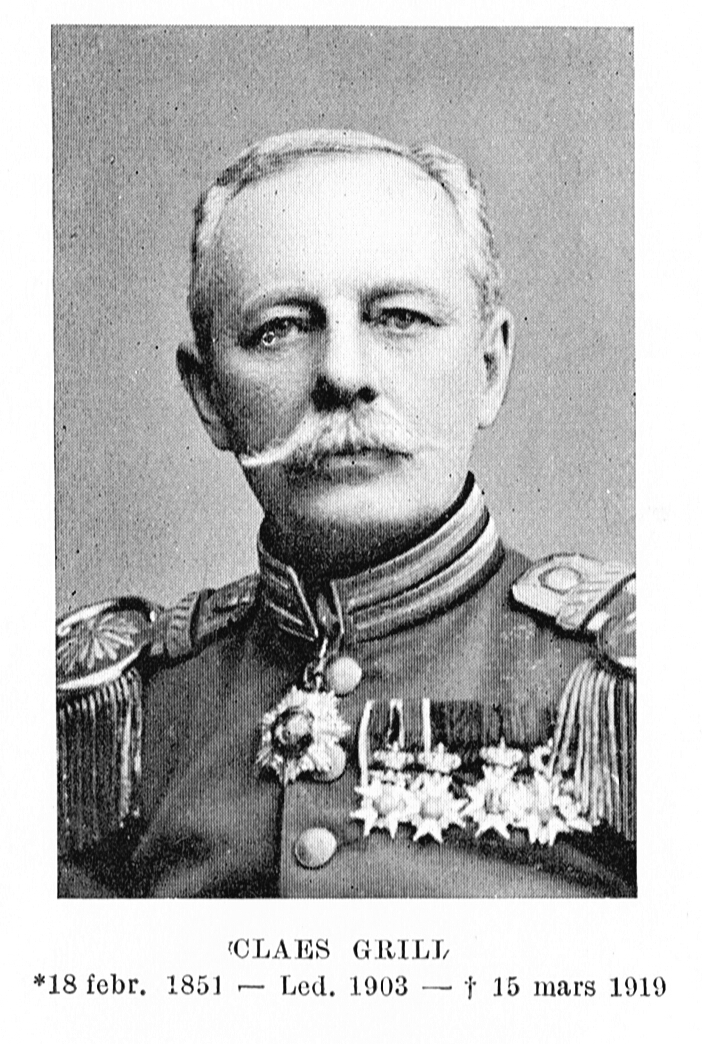

Claes Eric Grill (18 February 1851 – 5 March 1919) was a Swedish army officer and entomologist. A major work was a dictionary of entomological Latin and Swedish that was published in 1888.

Grill was born in Sala, Västmanland county to physician Claes Anton Oscar and Erika Gustava (Ödmann) Grill. Grill studied mathematics and physics at Uppsala University and then went to the Karlsberg military academy. He studied in France and joined the French engineering regiment in Versailles where he was involved in the construction of Haut Buc fort. He also saw action in Normandy after the Franco-German War of 1870-71. He returned to Sweden and completed the general staff course at the Artillery and Engineering Academy in Marieberg and was . Even as a young boy he was a collector of insects and he continued to collect beetles across Sweden during his military career. He was a fortification commander in Gothenburg in 1897 and then commandant at Älvsborg fortress. At Kronan he established a museum which was moved to Göteborg in 1908. He was elected to the Swedish Entomological Society in 1886 and was involved in organizing the beetle collections at the National Museum between 1888 and 1890. In 1896 he proposed the establishment of an entomology institute for agriculture which was approved and completed in 1898 at Albano. He became a secretary for the entomological association in 1895. Grill established a travelling scholarship for entomological research. He moved to Stockholm in 1907 and retired in 1909 as a colonel. He donated his insect collections to the forestry college in 1918.

Grill's major entomological writing was his 1888 Entomologisk latinsk-svensk ordbok, a dictionary of Latin and Swedish dealing with entomological terms. Grill received a French Legion of Honour for his services in France. In Sweden was made knight of the Order of the Swords in 1895, of the Order of Vasa in 1899 and of the Order of the Polar Star in 1904.
