= Scanian Anti-Aircraft Corps =

Coordinates: 55°25′57.1″N 13°50′42.8″E

- Skånska luftvärnskåren
- Active: 1941–1997
- Country: Sweden
- Allegiance: Swedish Armed Forces
- Branch: Swedish Army
- Type: Anti-aircraft
- Size: Corps
- Part of: I.milo (1941–1966); Milo S (1966–1997)
- Garrison/HQ: Ystad
- Colors: Red and white
- March: "Skånska luftvärnskårens marsch" (Lindgren) (Note: The marsch was adopted in 1942 and established in 1953 by Army Order 33/1953.)

Insignia
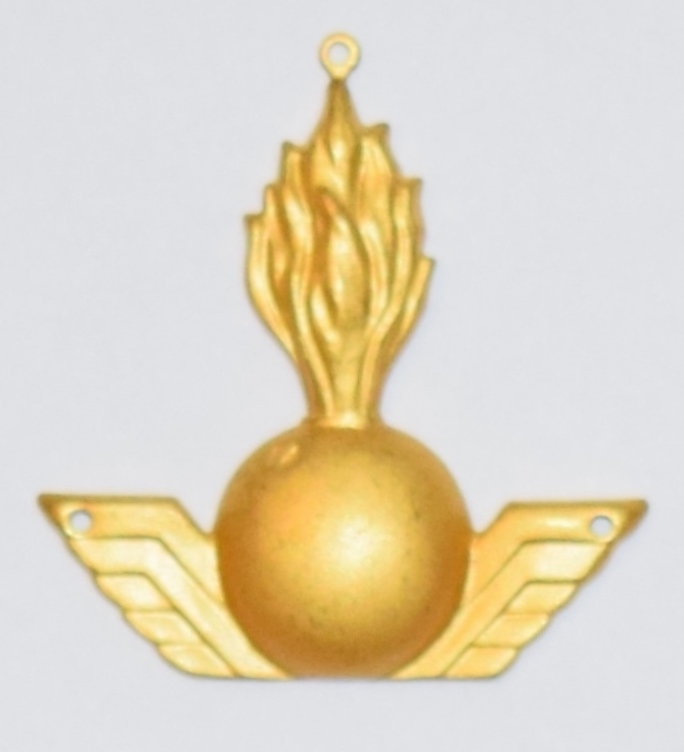
- Branch insignia

Scanian Anti-Aircraft Corps (Swedish: Skånska luftvärnskåren, Lv 4) was a Swedish Army anti-aircraft unit that operated between 1941 and 1997. The unit was first based in Malmö and later in Ystad.

== History ==
Through the Defence Act of 1936, the air defense was given a more independent role in the Swedish artillery, which among other things resulted in a number of anti-aircraft divisions being organized, where, among other things, a division was relocated to Malmö. The division was raised as a preparedness division of Östgöta Anti-Aircraft Artillery Regiment (A 10) on 1 October 1941 under the name Malmö Anti-Aircraft Division (A 9 L). Through the Defence Act of 1942, it was decided to separate the air defense from the artillery, to form its own corps. The change resulted, among other things, in the Malmö Anti-Aircraft Division being separated from Östgöta Anti-Aircraft Artillery Regiment, and formed on 1 October 1942 the Scanian Anti-Aircraft Corps (Lv 4). After a temporary placement, the corps was placed on 1 October 1943 in a barracks establishment in Husie in the eastern parts of Malmö. The move took place until 1 December 1943, and on 4 June 1944 a ceremony was held over the move into the new barracks area.

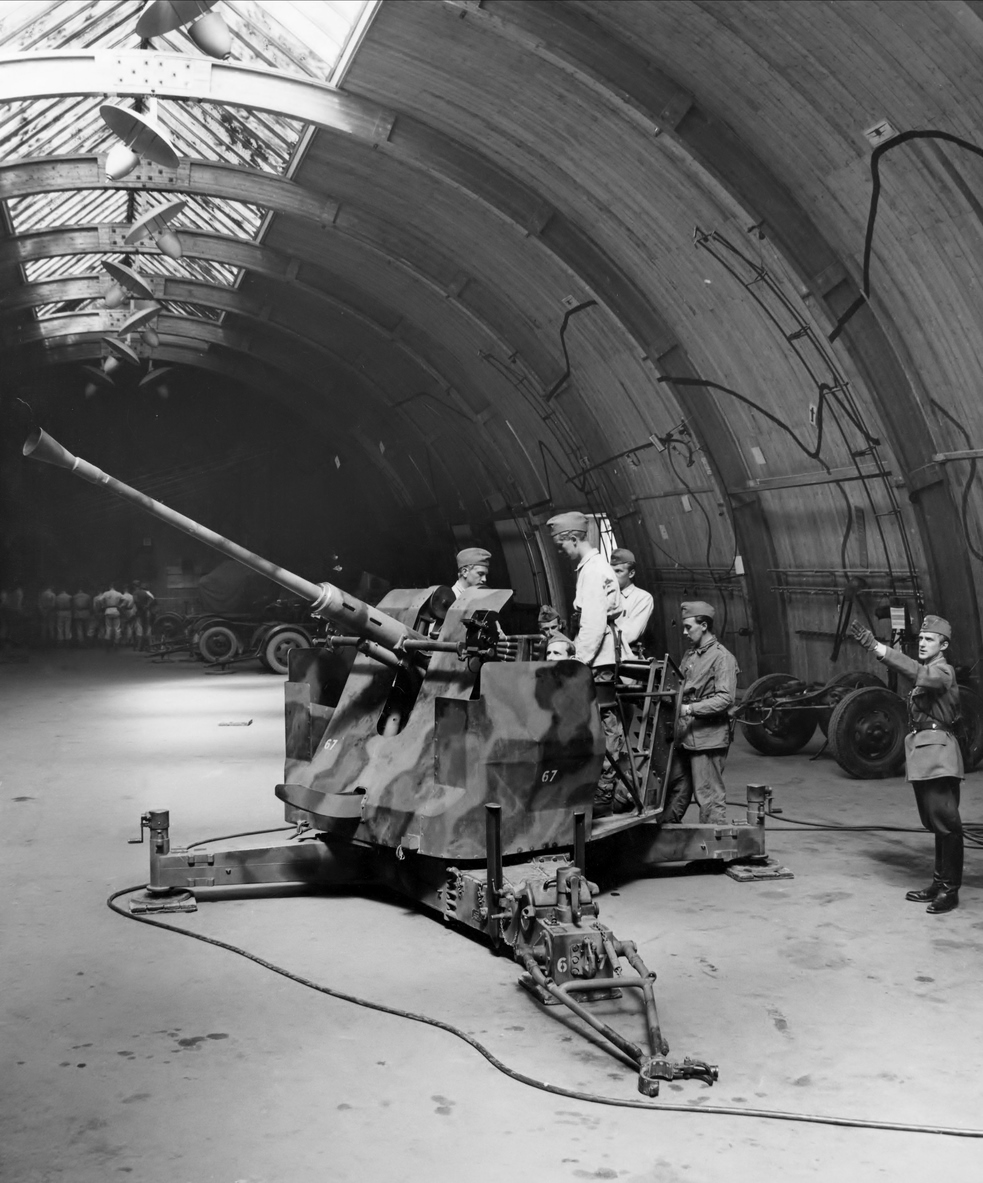
Bofors 40 mm gun at Lv 4 in Malmö

In connection with the OLLI reform which was carried out in the Swedish Armed Forces in 1973 and 1975, the South Scanian Regiment (P 7) was amalgamated with the Malmö Defence District (Malmö försvarsområde, Fo 11) and in 1976 formed the defence district regiment (försvarsområdesregemente) P 7/Fo 11. This led to the Scanian Anti-Aircraft Regiment being part of the Malmö Defence District became a B unit (training regiment), and its mobilization and materiel responsibility was transferred to the South Scanian Regiment, which became an A unit (defence district regiment). Prior to the decision that the South Scanian Regiment became a defence district regiment, the Chief of the Army, Lieutenant General Carl Eric Almgren, stated that the Scanian Anti-Air Regiment should have a priority to become a defence district regiment for Malmö Defence District.

The Government Bill 1977/78:65, concerning certain organizational issues, etc. concerning the Swedish defence, was adopted by the Riksdag on 15 December 1977. The bill included a relocation of the Scanian Anti-Air Regiment to Ystad to be co-located with the South Scanian Regiment. The background was, among other things, that the government in its bill considered that the Scanian Anti-Air Regiment had unsatisfactory access to training ground in Malmö and that the barracks establishment in Malmö was in need of extensive investments in order to be maintained in the long term, furthermore, it was also not suitable to be expanded to accommodate larger training units. From 1 July 1982, the Scanian Anti-Air Regiment began operating from Ystad. In Ystad, the regiment was co-located with the South Scanian Regiment's defence district staff, when the Malmö Brigade (Malmöbrigaden, PB 7) was relocated on 10 June 1982 to Revingehed.

Through the Defence Act of 1992, it was decided that all training regiments that did not raise war units the size of a regiment, would not be called a regiment either. This was because the government considered that the basic organization should reflect the war organization. In connection with this, the regiment was reduced to a corps on 1 July 1994 and regained its old name Scanian Anti-Aircraft Corps (Lv 4). Prior to the Defence Act of 1996, it was clear that the entire Swedish war organization would be reduced. This would also reduce the number of air defense units in the war organization. The Swedish Armed Forces proposed that the Göta Anti-Aircraft Corps (Lv 6) in Halmstad should be removed from the peace and war organization. However, the government considered that the Scanian Anti-Aircraft Corps should be disbanded, because it would provide better conditions for an economically advantageous overall solution than a disbandment of the corps in Halmstad, which had been relocated to Halmstad in the previous Defence Act. Thus, the Riksdag decided that the corps would be disbanded no later than 31 December 1997. In addition to the decision regarding the Scanian Anti-Aircraft Corps, it was also decided that the South Scanian Regiment (P 7/Fo 11) would be disbanded. Thus, Ystad was left entirely without military presence from 1 January 1998.

== Locations and training areas ==
=== Barracks ===
In connection with the Östgöta Anti-Aircraft Regiment setting up a detachment in Malmö on 1 October 1941, it was relocated to Gamla Borgarskolan on Repslagargatan. After the detachment was separated and formed its own independent unit, it was relocated to Husie on 1 October 1943. In 1963, a new barracks was built there and in 1964 a new missile hall. From 1 July 1982, the unit was relocated to Ystad, where the barracks area was taken over from the South Scanian Regiment (P 7).

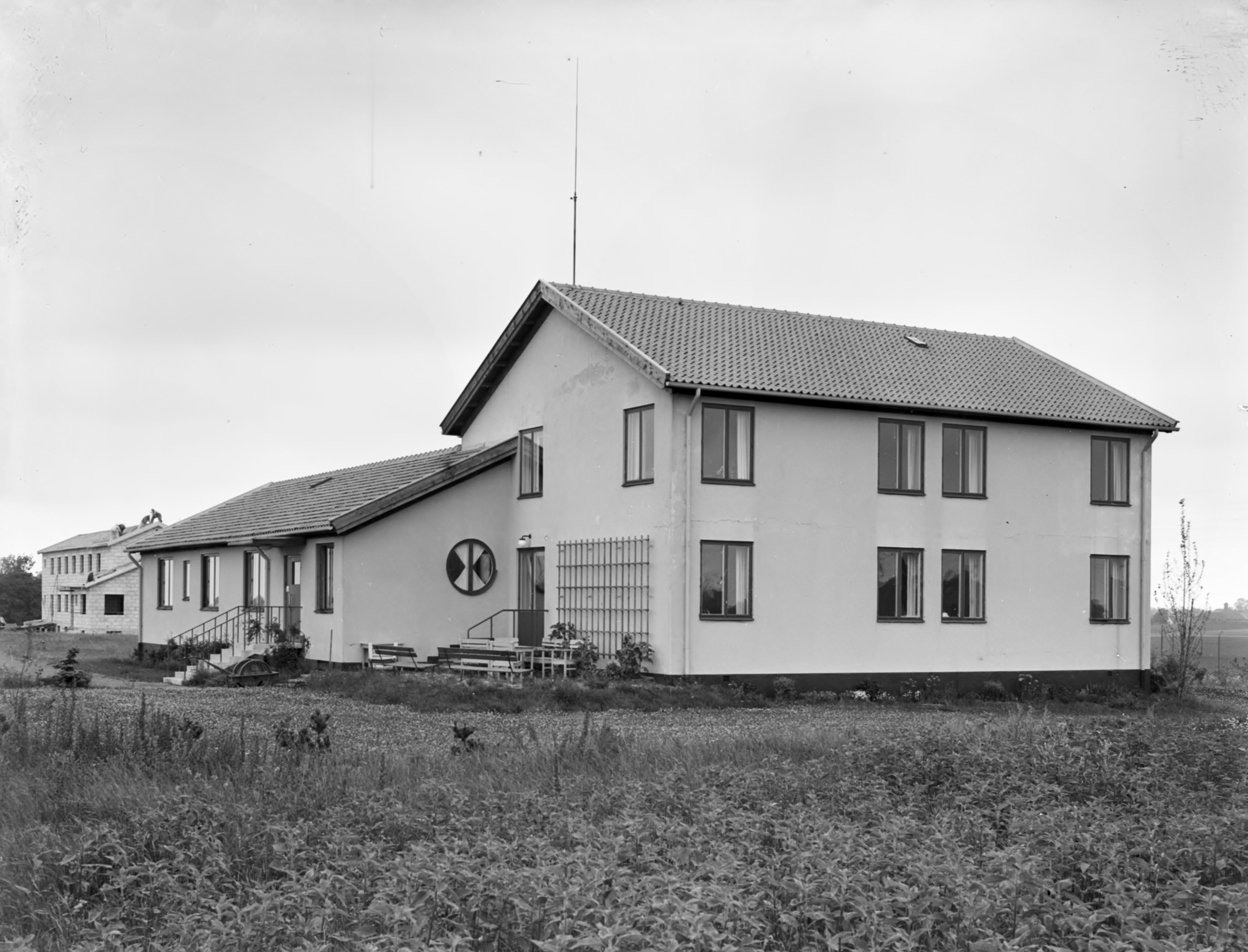
Barracks, Malmö

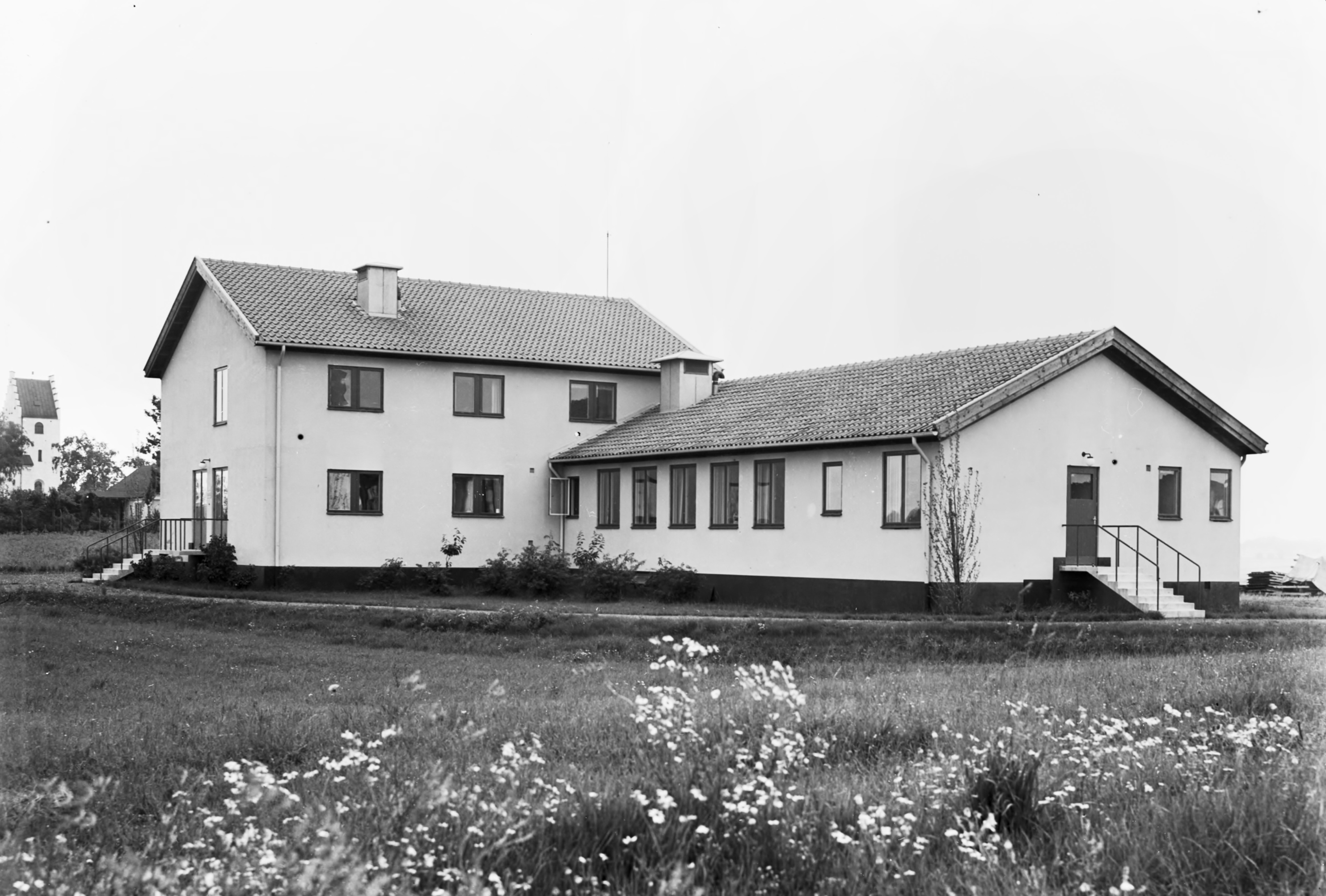
Barracks, Malmö

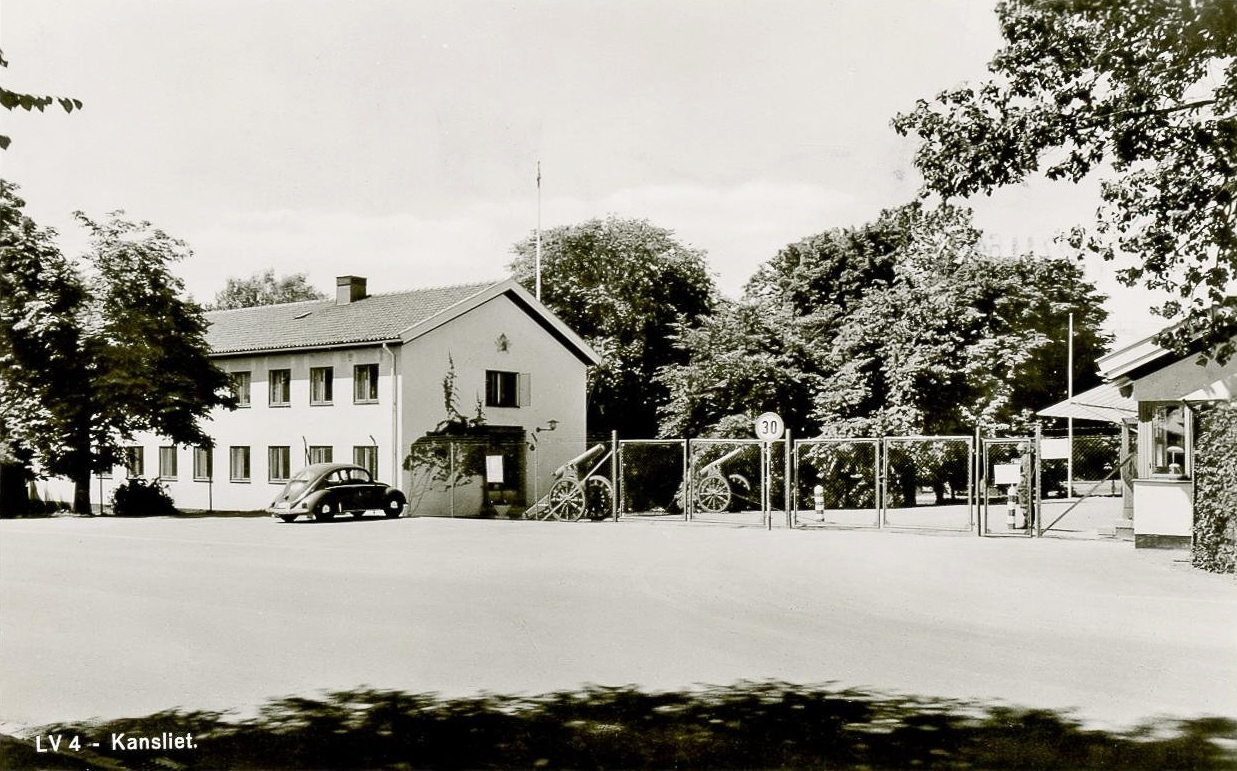
Guardhouse and chancellery building, Malmö

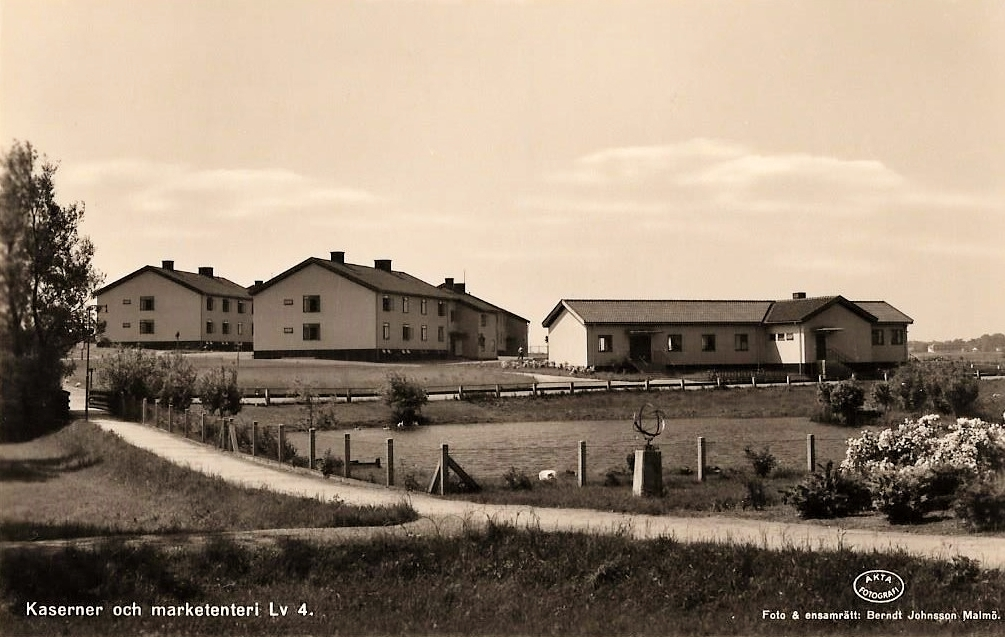
Barracks and canteen, Malmö

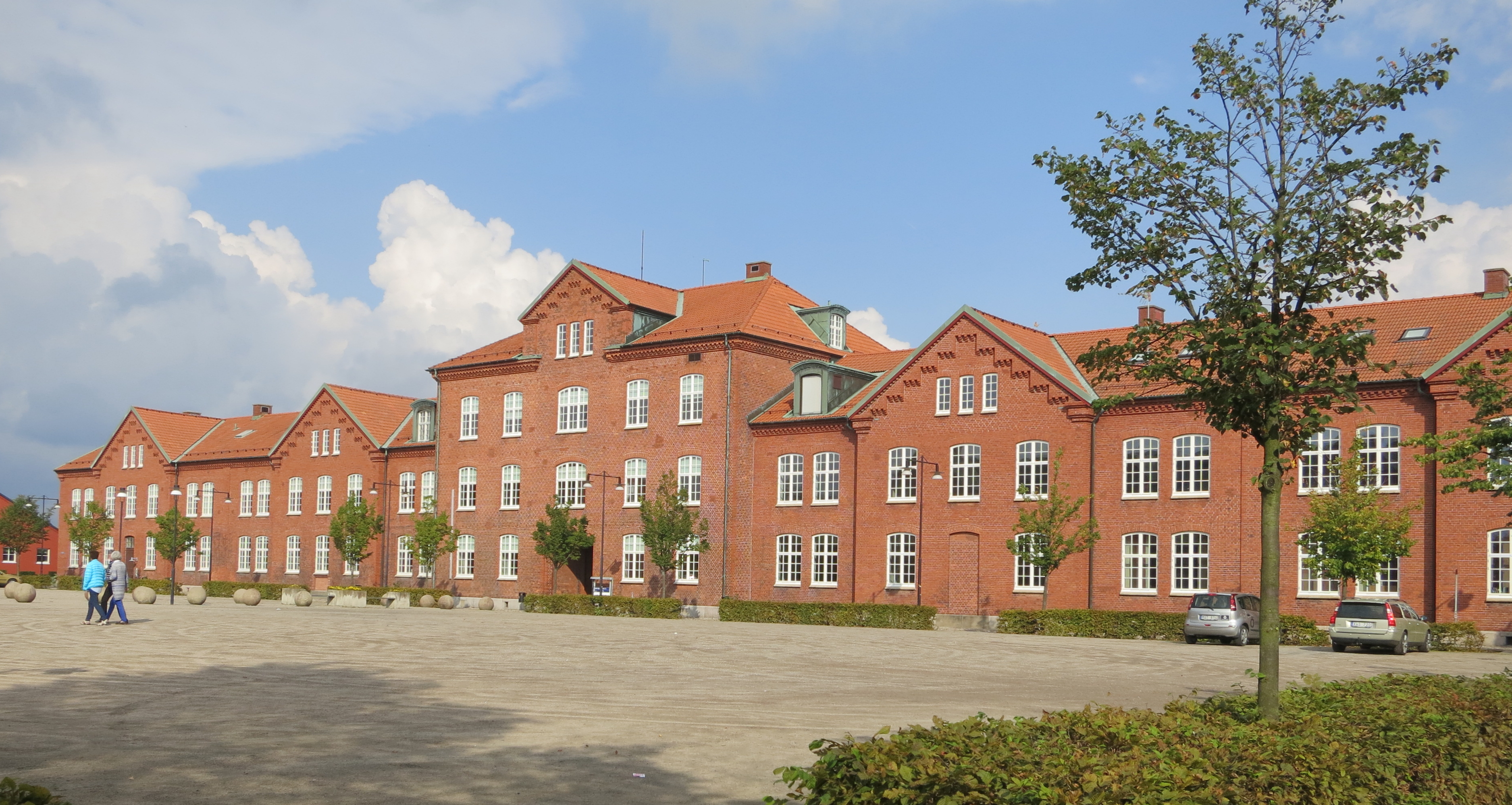
Barracks, Ystad

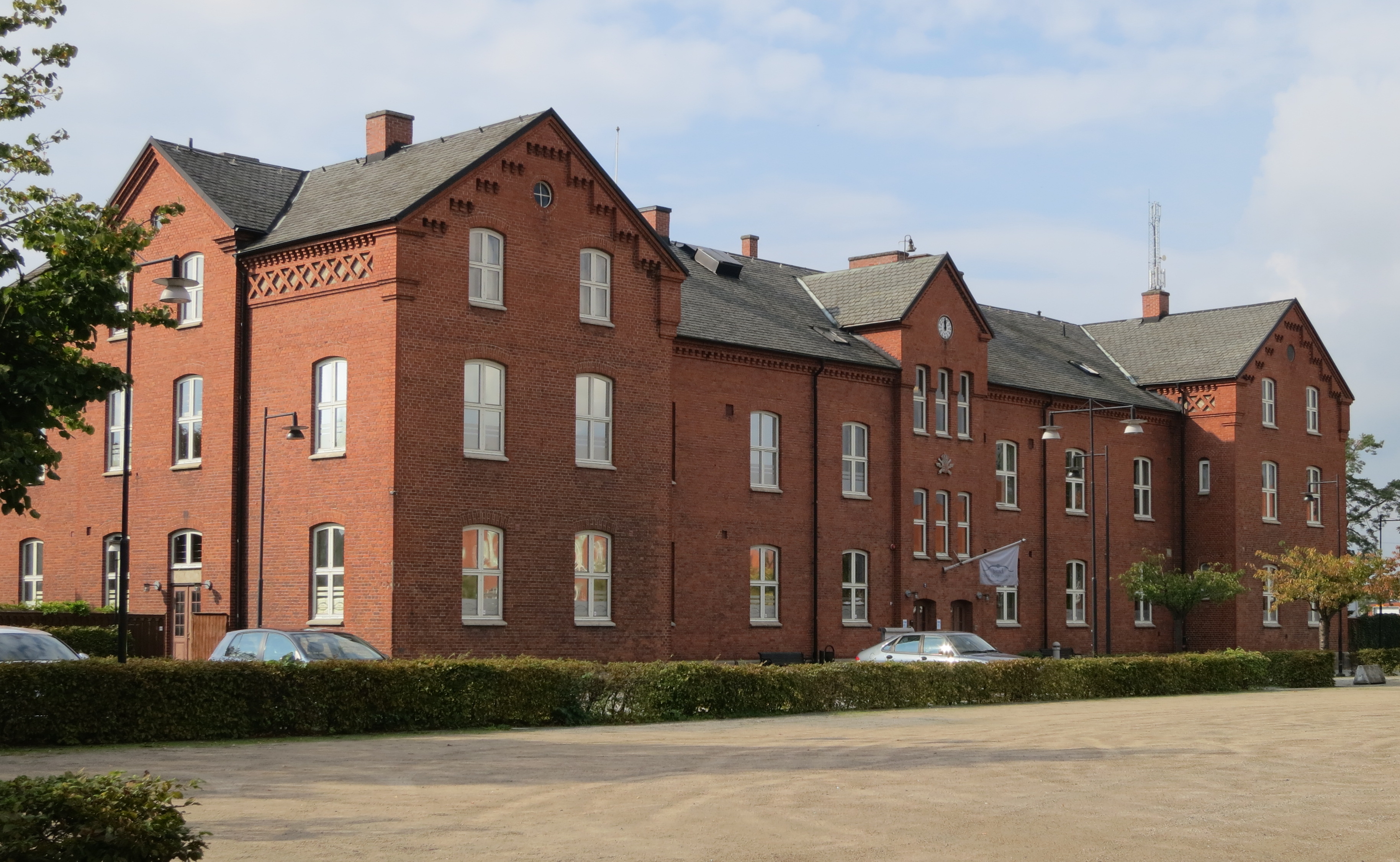
Barracks, Ystad

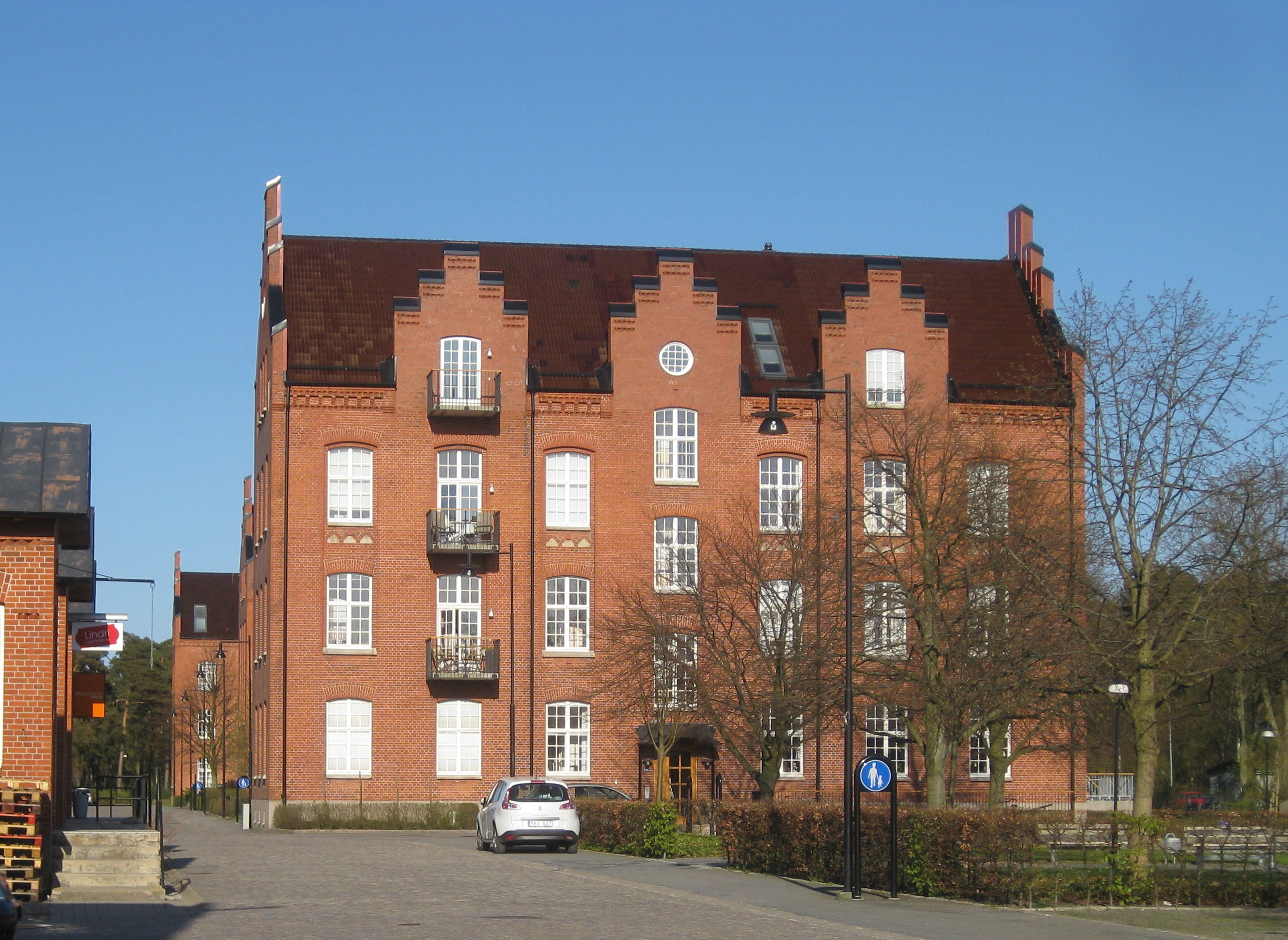
Barracks, Ystad

=== Training areas ===
The unit had its training sites at Falsterbo training area until 1947, and from 1945 also at Skanörs Ljung. When the unit was relocated to Ystad, they also began to train at Kabusa training area, near Nybrostrand.

== Heraldry and traditions ==
=== Coat of arms ===
The coat of arms of the unit was used from 1977 to 1997. Blazon: "Or, the provincial badge of Scania, an erazed head of a griffin gules, with open crown and arms azure. The shield surmounted two gunbarrels of older pattern in saltire and two wings, both or".

=== Colours, standards and guidons ===
The unit standard was presented to the unit in 1943 by the military commander of the I Military District, Major General Ernst af Klercker.

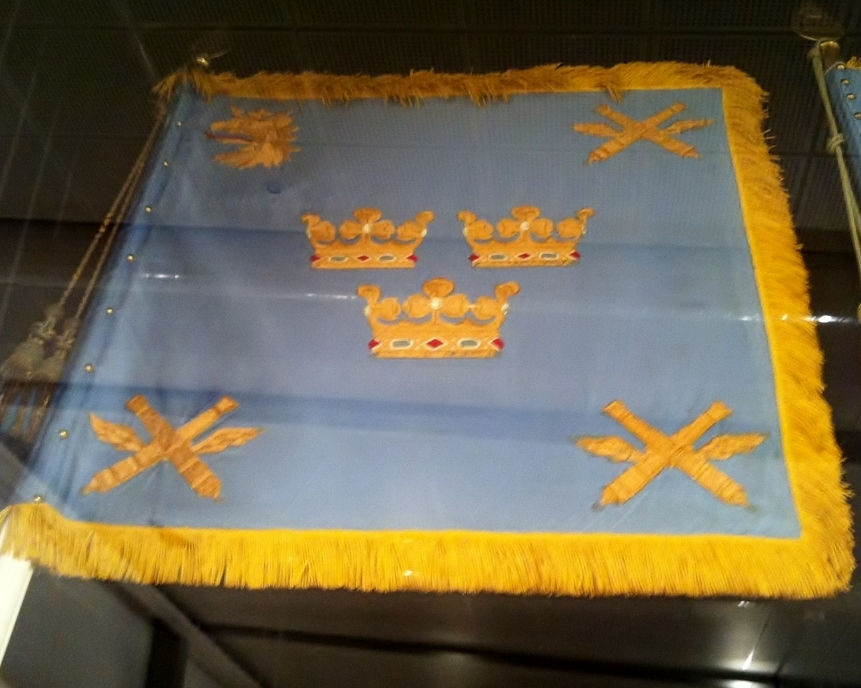
Standard

=== Medals ===
In 1997, the Skånska luftvärnskåren (Lv 4) minnesmedalj ("Scanian Anti-Aircraft Corps (Lv 4) Commemorative Medal") in silver (SkånlvkSMM) of the 8th size was established. The medal ribbon is of red moiré with white edges and a broad yellow stripe on the middle.

Medal ribbon

=== Traditions ===
The year after the disbandment of the Scanian Anti-Aircraft Corps, a birch was planted on the barracks yard in Ystad. This as a memory of a former birch, which stood in the same place and served as a benchmark for generations of conscripts, in the style of "Gather at the birch" or "Towards the birch". The former birch was cut down by a conscript in 1983, who had grown tired of the nagging about the birch. The new birch that now stands on the former barracks yard is of the genus Betula verrucosa.

== Commanding officers ==
Commanding officers between 1941 and 1997:

- 1941–1951: Ernst Jakobsson
- 1951–1954: Erik Rudberg
- 1954–1956: Sven Hådell
- 1956–1961: Carl Reuterswärd
- 1961–1969: Olle Rydner
- 1969–1975: Göran Persson
- 1975–1979: Yngve Berglund
- 1979–1984: Lars Mårtensson
- 1984–1993: Lars Bredberg
- 1993–1995: Christer Sterning
- 1995–1997: Gunnar Jansson

== Names, designations and locations ==
Name	Translation	From		To
Kungl. Malmö luftvärnsdivision	Royal Malmö Anti-Aircraft Division	1941-10-01	–	1942-09-30
Kungl. Skånska luftvärnskåren	Royal Scanian Anti-Aircraft Corps	1942-10-01	–	1962-06-30
Kungl. Skånska luftvärnsregementet	Royal Scanian Anti-Aircraft Regiment	1962-07-01	–	1974-12-31
Skånska luftvärnsregementet	Scanian Anti-Aircraft Regiment	1975-01-01	–	1994-06-30
Skånska luftvärnskåren	Scanian Anti-Aircraft Corps; Scanian Anti-Aircraft Artillery Corps	1994-07-01	–	1997-12-31
Designation		From		To
A 10 M		1941-10-01	–	1942-09-30
Lv 4		1942-10-01	–	1997-12-31
Location		From		To
Malmö Garrison		1941-10-01	–	1943-11-30
Malmö Garrison/Husie		1943-12-01	–	1982-06-30
Ystad Garrison		1982-07-01	–	1997-12-31

== See also ==
- List of Swedish anti-aircraft regiments
