= Gotland Anti-Aircraft Corps =

- Gotlands luftvärnskår
- Active: 1944–2000
- Country: Sweden
- Allegiance: Swedish Armed Forces
- Branch: Swedish Army
- Type: Anti-aircraft
- Size: Corps
- Part of: Lv 3 (1944–1953); Lv 2 (1953–1963); VII Military District (1963–1966); Eastern Military District (1966–1982); Gotland Military Command (1982–1994); Middle Military District (1994–2000)
- Garrison/HQ: Visby
- Mottos: Fecimus Facimus Faciemus ("We've done it - We do it - We shall do it")
- Colors: Red, later orange
- March: "Gotlands luftvärnskårs marsch" (Rösell) (Note: The march was established in 1962 by Army Order 138/1962. The march was inherited from Östgöta Anti-Aircraft Regiment.)

Insignia
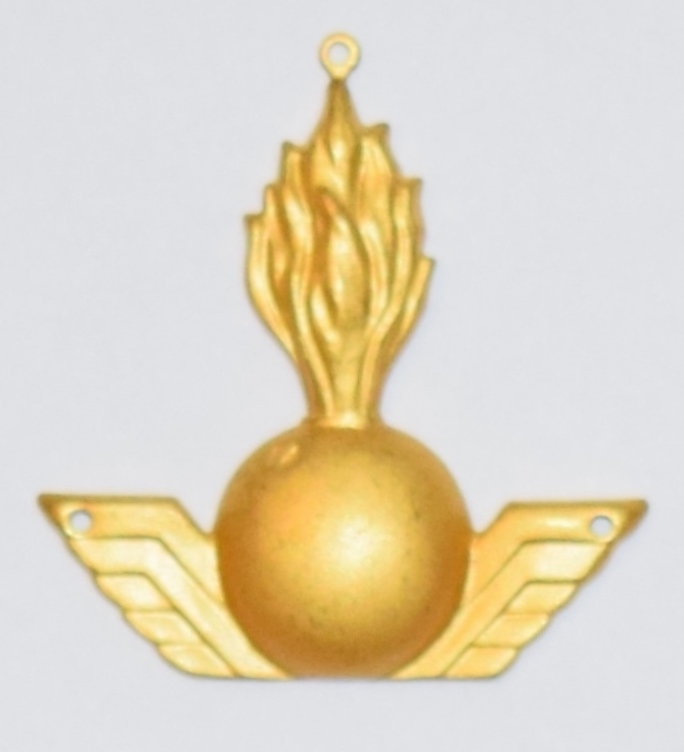
- Branch insignia

Gotland Anti-Aircraft Corps (Swedish: Gotlands luftvärnskår), also Lv 2, was a Swedish Army anti-aircraft unit that was active in various forms between 1944–2000. The unit was based in Visby on Gotland.

== History ==
Gotland's air defence has its origins in the Stockholm Anti-Aircraft Regiment's (Lv 3) artillery battery detachment on Gotland (Lv 3 G), established in 1944. When Stockholm Anti-Aircraft Regiment moved to Norrtälje in 1953, the responsibility for the artillery battery on Gotland was transferred to Östgöta Anti-Aircraft Regiment (Lv 2) in Linköping and thus the unit received the designation Lv 2 G. Östgöta Anti-Aircraft Regiment was disbanded in 1962. Lv 2 G took over its ensign and traditions on 2 April. On 1 April 1963, Lv 2 G became the new Lv 2. On 1 July 1968, the term "division" was changed to battalion. Lv 2 was then named Royal Gotland Anti-Aircraft Battalion. In 1969, the battalion received the heat-seeking anti-aircraft missile FIM-43 Redeye and could begin training.

In October 1978, Lv 2's basic training battalion moved from Korsbetningen (A 7's area) to Visborgsslätt, while the management for Lv 2, personnel and staff department, planning and production department and the artillery, simulation, fire-control system buildings remained at Korsbetningen. Every day from October 1978 to May 1986, the conscripts were transported between Visborgsslätt and Korsbetningen to be trained in their main service. In March 1983, the management moved from its old staff barracks at Korsbetningen to newly renovated premises in the top floor of the Chancellery building at Visborgsslätt. During the spring of 1986, Lv 2 could gradually settle in the newly built artillery/anti-aircraft building at Visborgsslätt. On 24 May 1986, Lv 2 officially moved from Korsbetningen to Visborgsslätt. At the same time, Lv 2 celebrated 50 years of air defense training on Gotland.

Through a reorganization of the Gotland Anti-Aircraft Battalion in 1994, the Gotland Anti-Aircraft Corps (Lv 2) was formed. The corps was disbanded on 31 August 2000 by previous decisions in the Defence Act of 2000.

== Locations and training areas ==
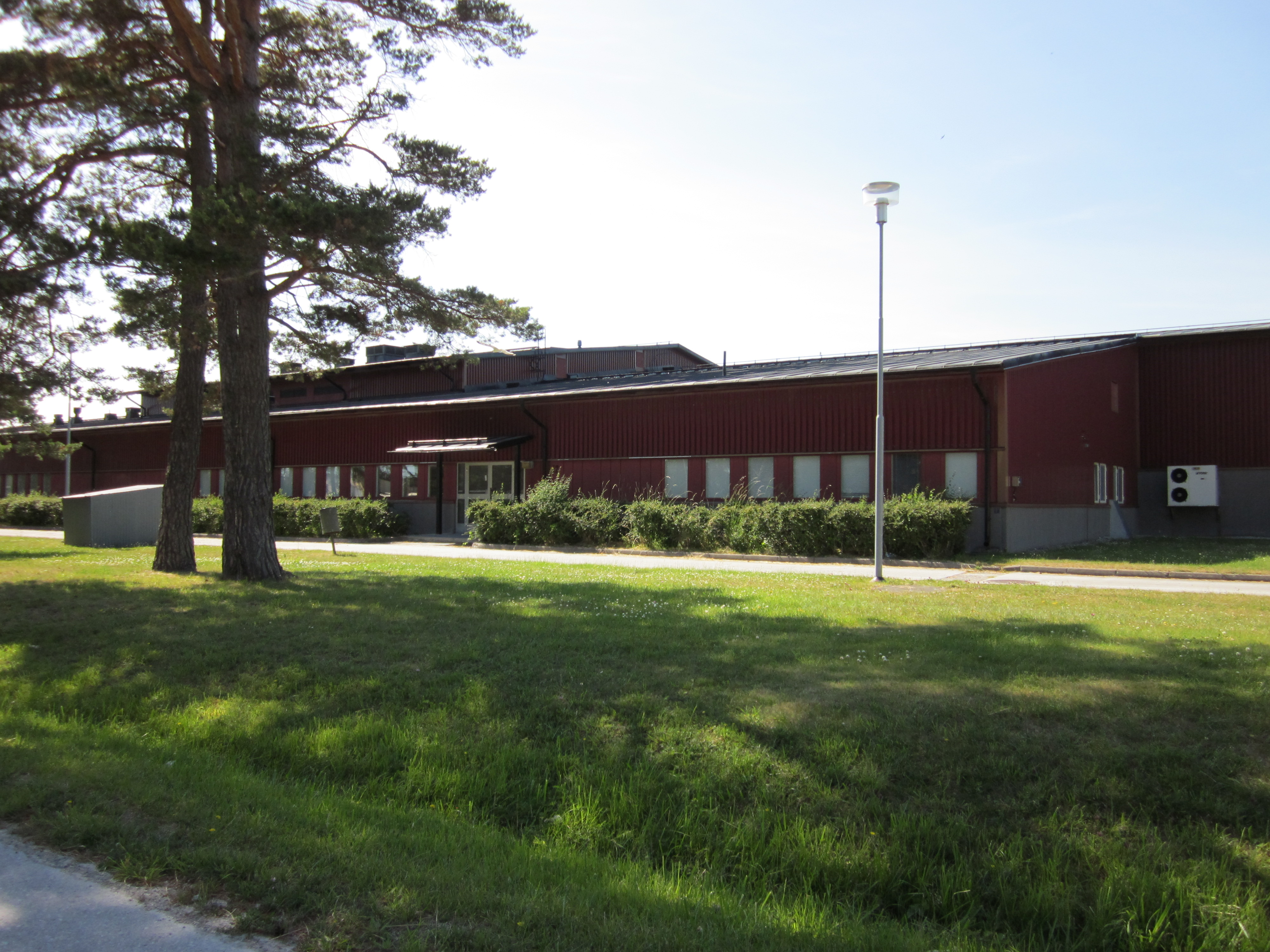
Building built in 1986 for Gotland Anti-Aircraft Battalion/Corps. Used for RBS 70 training and Bofors 40/70 training.

On 1 April 1944, the anti-aircraft defense on Gotland was transferred from the Coastal Artillery to Stockholm Anti-Aircraft Regiment (Lv 3), which formed the detachment Stockholm Anti-Aircraft Regiment's Battery on Gotland (Lv 3 G). The detachment was placed in a barracks camp by Söderväg in southwest Visby. In 1945, detachment moved into barracks 2 and 3, which were built the same year at Gotland Artillery Corps (A 7) barracks area at Östra Hansegatan. From 1 November 1952, the detachment was transferred to Östgöta Anti-Aircraft Regiment (Lv 2). From 1978, the conscript training was transferred to Gotland Regiment's (P 18) barracks area in southern Visby, where also the staff was moved on 17 March 1983.

== Heraldry and traditions ==
=== Colours, standards and guidons ===
On 6 June 1941, the Chief of the Army Lieutenant General Ivar Holmquist presented the colours to Östgöta Anti-Aircraft Regiment, which was carried by the regiment until 31 March 1962. The colours was then transferred to the Gotland battery, which at the same time was reorganized into an independent unit under the name of Gotland Anti-Aircraft Division (Lv 2), who came to carry the colours on certain occasions. Gotland Anti-Aircraft Division also took over the regiment traditions, and continued them until 31 August 2000. From 1 September 2000, the Air Defence Regiment (Lv 6) retains the memory of all disbanded anti-aircraft units.

In 1963, the colours was presented to Gotland Anti-Aircraft Division by the Chief of the Army, Lieutenant General Curt Göransson.

=== Coat of arms ===
The coat of the arms of the Gotland Anti-Aircraft Battalion 1977–1994 and the Gotland Anti-Aircraft Corps 1994–2000. Blazon: "Azure, the provincial badge of Gotland, a ram passant argent armed or, banner gules with crosstaff, edging and five flaps or. The shield surmounted two gunbarrels of older pattern in saltire and two wings, both or".

=== Medals ===
In 1990, the Gotlands luftvärnsbataljons (Lv 2) hedersmedalj ("Gotland Anti-Aircraft Battalion (Lv 2) Honorary Medal") in gold (GotlvkGM) of the 8th size was established. From 1994 to 2000, the medal was called Gotlands luftvärnskårs (Lv 2) hedersmedalj ("Gotland Anti-Aircraft Corps Honorary Medal") in gold (GotlvbatGM). The medal ribbon is of white moiré with a broad red stripe on each side.

In 2000, the Gotlands luftvärnskårs (Lv 2) minnesmedalj ("Gotland Anti-Aircraft Corps (Lv 2) Commemorative Medal") in silver (GotlvkSMM) of the 8th size was established. The medal ribbon is divided in red, white, orange, white and red moiré.

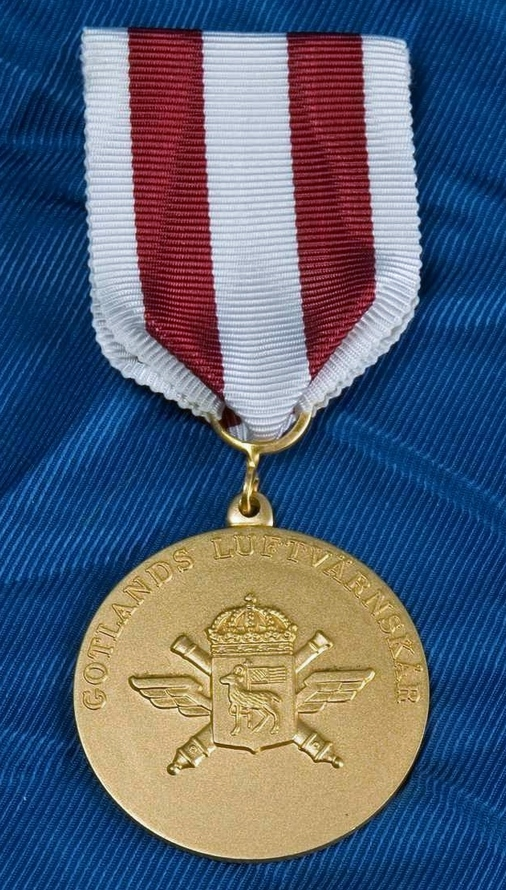
Gotland Anti-Aircraft Battalion (Lv 2) Honorary Medal in Gold, m/1990.

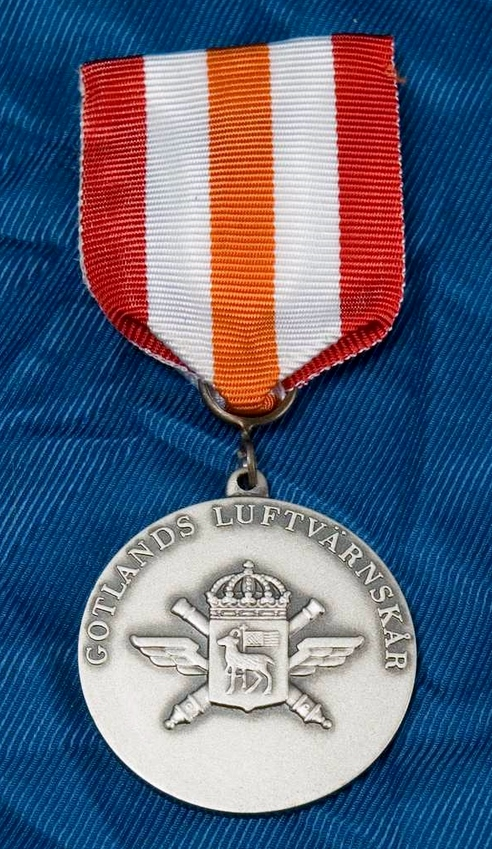
Gotland Anti-Aircraft Corps (Lv 2) Commemorative Medal in Silver, m/2000.

== Commanding officers ==
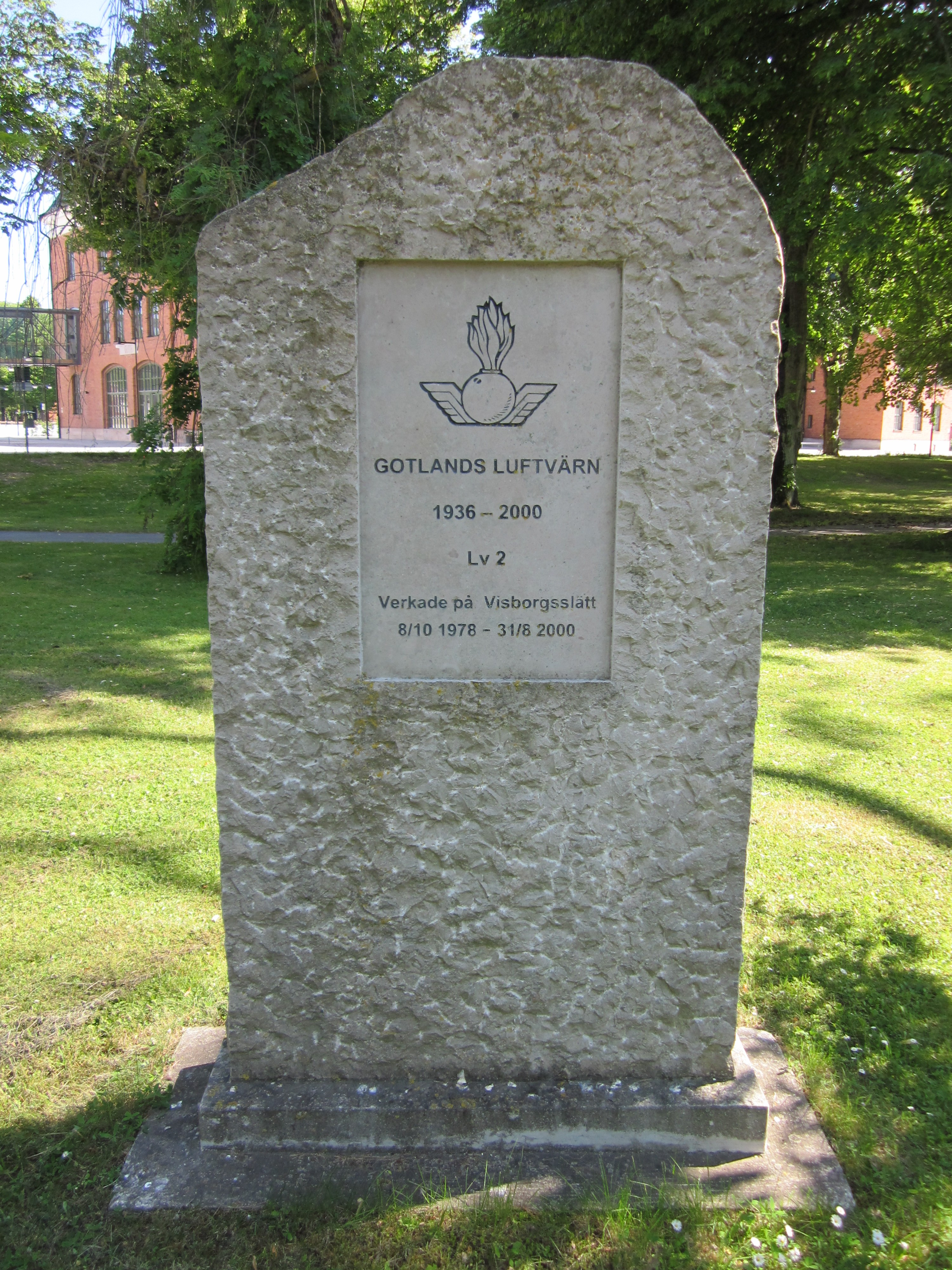
Memorial stone outside Gotland Regiment (P 18) for the air defense of Gotland. The text reads: "GOTLAND's ANTI-AIRCRAFT DEFENSE 1936-2000, Lv 2, operated at Visborgsslätt 8/10 1976 - 31/8 2000."

Commanding officers:

- 1944-04-01 – 1948-09-30: Capt Ewald Fock
- 1948-10-01 – 1954-03-31: Capt Lars Gustav Falk
- 1954-04-01 – 1956-09-30: Capt Gunnar Almqvist
- 1956-10-01 – 1961-03-31: Capt Lars Erik Lidsjö
- 1961-04-01 – 1972-09-30: Maj/LtCol Uno Engström
- 1972-10-01 – 1976-03-31: LtCol Per-Olof Martin
- 1976-04-01 – 1981-03-31: LtCol Lars Brunnberg
- 1981-04-01 – 1989-03-31: LtCol Hans Ahldén
- 1989-04-01 – 1992-06-30: LtCol Gunnar Jansson
- 1992-07-01 – 1994-08-31: LtCol Benkt Kullgard
- 1997-09-01 – 1999-09-30: LtCol Kent Samuelsson
- 1999-10-01 – 2000-08-31: LtCol Göran Wahlqvist

== Names, designations and locations ==
Name	Translation	From		To
Kungl. Stockholms luftvärnsregementes batteri på Gotland	Royal Stockholm Anti-Aircraft Regiment's Battery on Gotland	1944-04-01	–	1952-10-31
Kungl. Östgötas luftvärnsregementes batteri på Gotland	Royal Östgöta Anti-Aircraft Regiment's Battery on Gotland	1952-11-01	–	1961-03-31
Kungl. Östgötas luftvärnsregementes division på Gotland	Royal Östgöta Anti-Aircraft Regiment's Division on Gotland	1961-04-01	–	1963-03-31
Kungl. Gotlands luftvärnsdivision	Royal Gotland Anti-Aircraft Division; Royal Gotland Air Defense Division	1963-04-01	–	1968-06-30
Kungl. Gotlands luftvärnsbataljon	Royal Gotland Anti-Aircraft Battalion	1968-07-01	–	1974-12-31
Gotlands luftvärnsbataljon	Gotland Anti-Aircraft Battalion	1975-01-01	–	1994-06-30
Gotlands luftvärnskår	Gotland Anti-Aircraft Corps	1994-07-01	–	2000-08-31
Avvecklingsorganisation	Decommissioning Organisation	2000-09-01	–	2001-06-30
Designation		From		To
Lv 3 G		1944-04-01	–	1952-10-31
Lv 2 G		1952-11-01	–	1963-03-31
Lv 2		1963-04-01	–	2000-08-31
Location		From		To
Norra Hällarna, Visby		1944-04-11	–	1945-??-??
Korsbetningen, Visby		1945-??-??	–	1986-05-23
Visborgsslätt, Visby		1986-05-24	–	2001-06-30

== See also ==
- List of Swedish anti-aircraft regiments
