= Kronan, Luleå =

Kronan
- Residential area
- Interactive map of Kronan
- Coordinates: 65°35′40″N 22°11′10″E
- Country: Sweden
- Province: Norrbotten
- County: Norrbotten County
- Municipality: Luleå Municipality

Population (2010)
  - Total: 597
- Time zone: UTC+1 (CET)
  - Summer (DST): UTC+2 (CEST)

Kronan is a residential area in Luleå, Sweden. It had 597 inhabitants in 2010.
