= Air Defence Regiment (Sweden) =

Coordinates: 56.6894°N 12.8614°E

- Luftvärnsregementet
- Active: 1942–present
- Country: Sweden
- Allegiance: Swedish Armed Forces
- Branch: Swedish Army
- Type: Anti-aircraft
- Size: Regiment
- Part of: III. milo (1942–1966); Milo V (1966–1993); Milo S (1993–2000); OPIL (2000–2005); SAFHQ (2005–)
- Garrison/HQ: Gothenburg (1942–1994); Halmstad (1994)
- Motto: Semper metam contingimus ("We always reach the goal")
- Colors: Blue and white
- March: "Quo vadis" (Hellström) (Note: The march was adopted in 1943, and was established in 1953 by Army Order 33/1953.)

Commanders
- Current commander: COL Sofia Westermark

Insignia
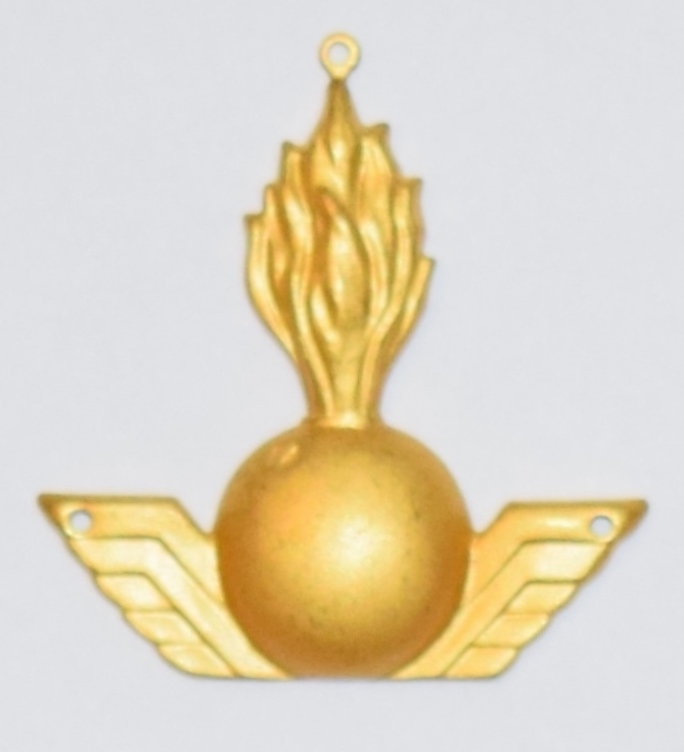
- Branch insignia

The Air Defence Regiment (Swedish: Luftvärnsregementet, Lv 6), is the only anti-aircraft regiment in the Swedish Armed Forces. Its new organisation was introduced in 2000, when all other anti-aircraft units in Sweden were disbanded. The regiment is located in Halmstad and has the responsibility for training two air defence battalions and one home guard battalion.

== History ==
Through the Defence Act of 1936, the air defence was given a more independent role in the Swedish artillery, which among other things resulted in a number of air defence divisions being organized, where, among other things, a division was relocated to Gothenburg. The division was raised as a preparedness division of Karlsborg Anti-Aircraft Artillery Regiment (A 9) on 1 October 1941 under the name Gothenburg Anti-Aircraft Division (A 9 G). Through the Defence Act of 1942, it was decided to separate the air defence from the artillery to form its own branch. The change resulted, among other things, in the Gothenburg Anti-Aircraft Division being separated fromKarlsborg Anti-Aircraft Artillery Regiment and forming the Gothenburg Anti-Aircraft Corps (LV 6) on 1 October 1942 (Lv 6). The division from 1 October 1941 was stationed in provisional barracks on Kviberg road with the expeditionary team at Utbyvägen. On 1 October 1944 the unit began a move into the newly built barracks in Högsbo, which were completed 12 August 1945. On 21 October 1945, a move-in ceremony was held over the new location.

Prior to the Defence Act of 1958, the Swedish government proposed to the Riksdag that the Göta Artillery Regiment (A 2) be disbanded. This is against the background that the government considered that the artillery would train entire divisional units within the framework of the peace unit something that was not considered possible unless the number of peace units was reduced. The fact that the Göta Artillery Regiment was proposed to be disbanded was based on the fact that the unit's establishment was considered to be surrounded by civilian interests, and that the unit's training area in the long term did not correspond to the requirements of modern artillery equipment. It was proposed that the training contingent of conscripts be distributed to the remaining artillery units. At the same time, the government proposed that Kviberg's barracks should remain, as the Gothenburg Anti-Aircraft Corps' (Lv 6) establishment in Högsbo was also rebuilt and had even worse conditions compared to Kviberg. Thus, it was proposed that the Gothenburg Anti-Aircraft Corps should be moved and take over the establishment in Kviberg. Kviberg has had the Swedish Army Radar and Anti-Aircraft Engineering School (Arméns radar- och luftvärnsmekanikerskola, RMS) since 1950, which the government also considered to facilitate the necessary collaboration between the two units. This was partly because Gothenburg was a primary protection object, which in the future could require defence with surface-to-air missiles. The Defence Act stated that the Göta Artillery Regiment would be reorganized into an air defence regiment with the Army Radar and Anti-Aircraft Engineering School affiliated. In practice, however, the Göta Artillery Regiment was disbanded as a peace unit on 31 March 1962. However, the name "Göta" was taken over by the Gothenburg Anti-Aircraft Corps, which on 1 July 1962 adopted the name Göta Anti-Aircraft Regiment. The Gothenburg Anti-Aircraft Corps officially moved into Kviberg on 1 April 1962. Initially, it was co-located with a disbandment organization formed after the disbandment of the Göta Artillery Regiment, which ended on 30 September 1962, 1 from October 1962, the unit was completely organized in Kviberg. That the corps was reorganized into a regiment was due to the Göta Artillery Regiment (A 2), Karlsborg Anti-Aircraft Regiment (Lv 1) and Östgöta Anti-Aircraft Regiment (Lv 2) being disbanded, which in practice did not mean any increase of regiments in the army's peace organization but also because the army in the early 1960s bought the MIM-23 Hawk missile system, which led to air defence missile units being organized at the unit in 1962.

In connection with the OLLI reform, which was implemented in the Swedish Armed Forces in the years 1973–1975, A units and B units were formed. The A units were the regiments that were given responsibility for a defence district, and which were referred to as defence district regiments (försvarsområdesregemente). At the same time, the defence district regiments were given the mobilization and materiel responsibility within the defence district. This meant that the army units that were part of a defence district became a B unit (training regiment). In Scania, on the west coast and in Norrbotten, certain deviations were made from the principled organization, ie a defence district regiment was assigned the overall mobilization responsibility within the defence district. On the west coast, the departure was made within the Gothenburg and Bohus Defence District (Fo 34), where the Gothenburg Coastal Artillery Defence (GbK) became the defence district authority and was given the overall mobilization responsibility within the defence district. However, the mobilization responsibility did not professionally include the mobilization responsibility for the infantry brigades were are trained at Bohuslän Regiment (I 17), thus the departure from the principled organization. The Göta Anti-Aircraft Regiment, which was part of the Gothenburg and Bohus Defence District, however, became a B unit, where the Gothenburg and Bohus Defence District were given the overall mobilization responsibility. On 1 July 1975, the Göta Anti-Aircraft Regiment joined the new organization as a training regiment.

The Government Bill 1977/78:65, concerning defence organizational issues, was adopted by the Riksdag on 15 December 1977. The bill contained, among other things, a disbandment of Sundsvall Anti-Aircraft Regiment (Lv 5). The background was, among other things, that the government in its bill considered that Sundsvall Anti-Aircraft Regiment had unsatisfactory access to training areas in Sundsvall, which the government also stated that the Scanian Anti-Aircraft Regiment (Lv 4) in Malmö and the Göta Anti-Aircraft Regiment (Lv 6) were missing. Prior to the bill, the government's inquiry had come to the conclusion that only one air defence unit could be disbanded for reasons of saving and rationalization. The inquiry had examined the possibilities of disbanding Sundsvall Anti-Aircraft Regiment or Göta Anti-Aircraft Regiment. To the detriment of the Sundsvall Anti-Aircraft Regiment, the investigation pointed out, among other things, that the conscripts were largely recruited from the Western Military District, which meant that they were trained far from their hometown, while the Göta Anti-Aircraft Regiment recruited its conscripts from the Gothenburg region. Furthermore, a disbandment of Sundsvall Anti-Aircraft Regiment would affect fewer people than a disbandment of the Göta Anti-Aircraft Regiment. Against a disbandment was the ability to train air defence units in winter conditions would be reduced, and that the regiment at close range had the air defence's best training area, Åstön. The Chief of the Army advocated maintaining the Göta Anti-Aircraft Regiment in front of Sundsvall Anti-Aircraft Regiment, as he considered that it would benefit the army's design in the longer term. At its base in Kviberg, the Göta Anti-Aircraft Regiment also had a better training capacity compared with the regiment in Sundsvall. The inquiry therefore advocated the disbandment of Sundsvall Anti-Aircraft Regiment during the 1983/84 financial year. In the same bill, the government changed the previous Riksdag decision to relocate the Army Radar and Anti-Aircraft Engineering School to Östersund, so that it would remain in Gothenburg.

hrough the Defence Act of 1992, it was decided that all training regiments that did not raise war units the size of a regiment, would not be called a regiment either. This was because the government considered that the basic organization should reflect the war organization. The Defence Act also led to concentrating the brigades' training to a number of infantry and armored regiments, and in order to achieve further rationality in the training of the military units in western Sweden. It was decided to relocate the Göta Anti-Aircraft Regiment to Halmstad, to be co-located with Halland Regiment (I 16/Fo 31). The other units in Kviberg, the Swedish Anti-Aircraft Technical School (Luftvärnets tekniska skola, LvTS) were relocated to Östersund and the Swedish Anti-Aircraft Officers’ College (Luftvärnets officershögskola, LvOHS) was relocated to Norrtälje. In connection with the Defence Act, the regiment was reduced to a corps on 1 July 1994 and regained its old name Göta Anti-Aircraft Corps (Lv 6), and the defence district group (försvarsområdesgrupp) Gothenburg Group was transferred to the West Coast Naval Command. Through the Defence Act of 2000, the government considered that only four anti-aircraft battalions were needed in the future rapid reaction organisation (insatsorganisation). What was clear before the Defence Act was to disband Gotland Anti-Aircraft Corps (Lv 2) and reduce Norrland Anti-Aircraft Corps (Lv 7) to a battalion and place it under Norrbotten Regiment (I 19). This was because the activities at Gotland Anti-Aircraft Corps were considered too limited to be able to develop into a single unit for the country's air defence. Regarding Norrland Anti-Aircraft Corps, the government judged that it would give serious competence losses in the short term to locate the entire air defence function to Boden.

The choice was between retaining Roslagen Anti-Aircraft Corps (Lv 3) in Norrtälje or Göta Anti-Aircraft Corps (Lv 6) in Halmstad, as the main alternative for future air defence training. What was in favor of maintaining Roslagen Anti-Aircraft Corps was, among other things, good training areas and that the Air Defence Combat School (Luftvärnets stridsskola, LvSS), was located in Norrtälje, which also had a test site on Väddö training area. What was in favor of a disbandment of Roslagen Anti-Aircraft Corps was to build up competence for Missile System 77/97, and that the corps was an isolated organizational unit with limited opportunities for garrison coordination. This was something that was considered an advantage, as the Göta Anti-Aircraft Corps was already part of a garrison that housed both the Military Academy Halmstad (Militärhögskolan Halmstad, MHS H) and the Swedish Armed Forces' Halmstad Schools (Försvarsmaktens Halmstadsskolor, FMHS). At the same time, the government considered that it had to take into account that the corps was affected in the two previous Defence Acts, partly through the relocation from Gothenburg, and by taking over parts of air defence training from the Scanian Anti-Aircraft Corps (Lv 4) which was disbanded by the Defence Act of 1996. What was in favor of a disbandment of the Göta Anti-Aircraft Corps were limited training area opportunities at the Ringenäs training area, as well as large investment costs in Halmstad to relocate the Air Defence Combat School to Halmstad.

However, the government judged that synergy effects with units and schools were good in Halmstad, compared with Norrtälje. The government also considered that Roslagen Anti-Aircraft Corps had the best conditions for air defence training from a purely air defence perspective. Göta Anti-Aircraft Corps was judged by the government to have sufficiently good conditions for continued air defence training. In its bill regarding the Defence Act of 2000, the government disbanded Roslagen Anti-Aircraft Corps and retained the Göta Anti-Aircraft Corps. This was considered to be due to the Göta Anti-Aircraft Corps having a greater and better opportunity for garrison coordination with an expanded infrastructure to cope with increased mechanization of the air defence. According to the Defence Act, the training of the air defence was concentrated in four anti-aircraft battalions, three in Halmstad and Norrland Anti-Aircraft Battalion in Boden. As the Göta Anti-Aircraft Corps became a unified unit for the country's air defence, containing three anti-aircraft battalions and the Air Defence Combat School, the corps was elevated to a regiment, and on 1 July 2000 adopted the new name Air Defence Regiment (Lv 6). In Halmstad, the new regiment took over the barracks area from the disbanded units Halland Regiment (I 16 / Fo 31) and Halland Brigade (Hallandsbrigaden, IB 16).

Through the Defence Act of 2004, the Riksdag decided, among other things, to reduce the number of anti-aircraft battalions from four to one, which meant that Norrland Anti-Aircraft Battalion was disbanded. With this, the air defence became completely concentrated in Halmstad. The Defence Act of 2004 also included the disbandment of four military districts. The main tasks of the military districts were territorial activities, training of Home Guard and volunteer personnel and operations, primarily within the framework of support to society. Through the disbandment of the military districts, the training group Hallandsgruppen was subordinated from 1 January 2006 to the Air Defence Regiment. In connection with the conscription being suspended by the Defence Act of 2009, two new battalions were raised, which consist of contracted soldiers as well as employed officers and soldiers. Parts of the battalions participated both nationally and internationally in ground and air operations, such as Nordic Battlegroup 11 (NBG 11), the Swedish Kosovo Force in 2012 and the Swedish operation in Afghanistan in 2013.

On 1 January 2013, four military regions were formed, where the Western Military Region was subordinated to the commander of Skaraborg Regiment, but was under the command of the Chief of Joint Operations at the Swedish Armed Forces Headquarters in Stockholm regarding ground territorial leadership in peace, crisis and war. However, the head of the Halland Group (Hallandsgruppen, HAG) was still subordinate to the commander of the Air Defence Regiment regarding production management of the Home Guard units and task management within the training groups' geographical area. On 1 January 2018, however, the leadership of Skaraborg Regiment and the Western Military Region was divided by the appointment of a separate commander for the Western Military Region. Furthermore, the staff of the Western Military Region in command matters was directly subordinated to the Chief of Joint Operations at the Swedish Armed Forces Headquarters. In the Swedish Armed Forces' budget documentation for the government for 2020, it was proposed that the four military regional staffs be established as separate organizational units from 1 January 2020. The chiefs of the military region staffs were in turn proposed to be subordinated to the Chief of Home Guard regarding the production of training groups and Home Guard units. This meant that the training groups were transferred organizationally from a training unit to the four military regional staffs. In the Government's bill, however, the Government emphasized that the military regional division could be adjusted, depending on the outcome of the investigation "Ansvar, ledning och samordning inom civilt försvar" (Directive 2018:79). For the Air Defence Regiment, this change meant that the Halland Group was transferred to the Western Military Region from 1 January 2020.

== Organisation ==
The regiment has the following organisation:

- Air Defence Battalion, which trains the troops for the 61st and 62nd air defence battalions
  - Management Company, training staff, signal, support and radar troops
  - Livkompaniet, basic training company
  - 70 Company, training recruits with the Robotsystem 70 and the RBS 23-radar
  - 97 Company, training recruits with the Robotsystem 97 and the RBS 23-radar
  - Logistics Company, training supply, maintenance and medical troops
- Hallands Group, which trains the 45th Home Guard Battalion (Light infantry)

== Locations and training areas ==
=== Barracks ===
In connection with Karlsborg Anti-Aircraft Regiment (Lv 1) detaching a preparedness division on 1 October 1941 to Gothenburg, it was placed in a barracks camp at Kvibergsvägen 19-21. After the detachment was separated from the regiment on 1 October 1942 and formed the Göta Anti-Aircraft Corps (Lv 6), the corps began to move into a newly built barracks area on Tunnlandsgatan 2A in Högsbo on 30 September 1944. On 12 August 1945 the move was completed, and on 21 October 1945 a ceremony was held over the move. On 1 April 1962, the corps moved to the barracks in Kviberg, where they took over the camp from disbanded Göta Artillery Regiment (A 2). The former barracks area in Högsbo later became Högsbo Hospital.

On 1 July 1994, the unit was relocated to Halmstad and was co-located with Halland Regiment (I 16). From 1 July 2000, the unit took over the entire area.

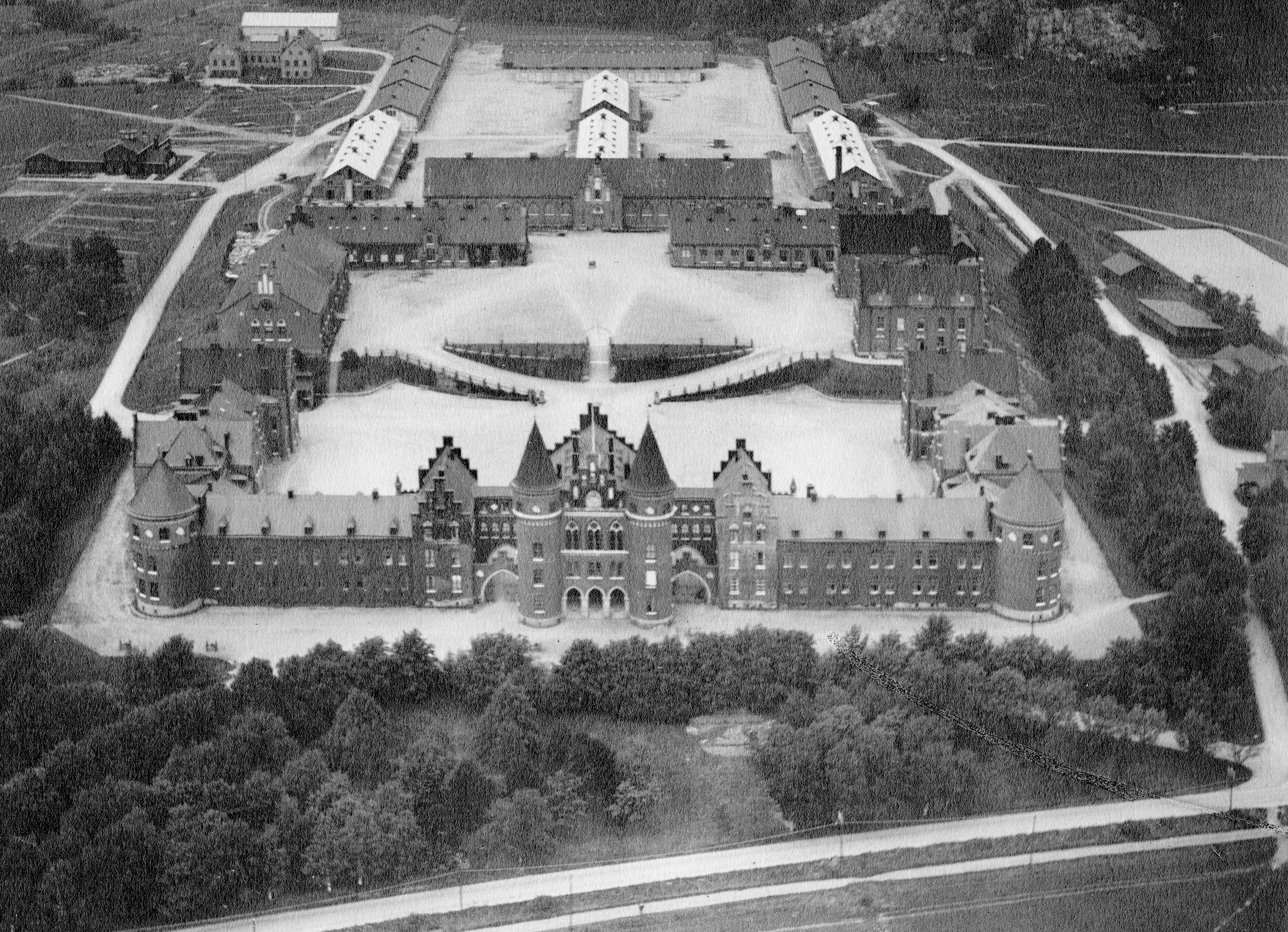
Kviberg barracks, Gothenburg

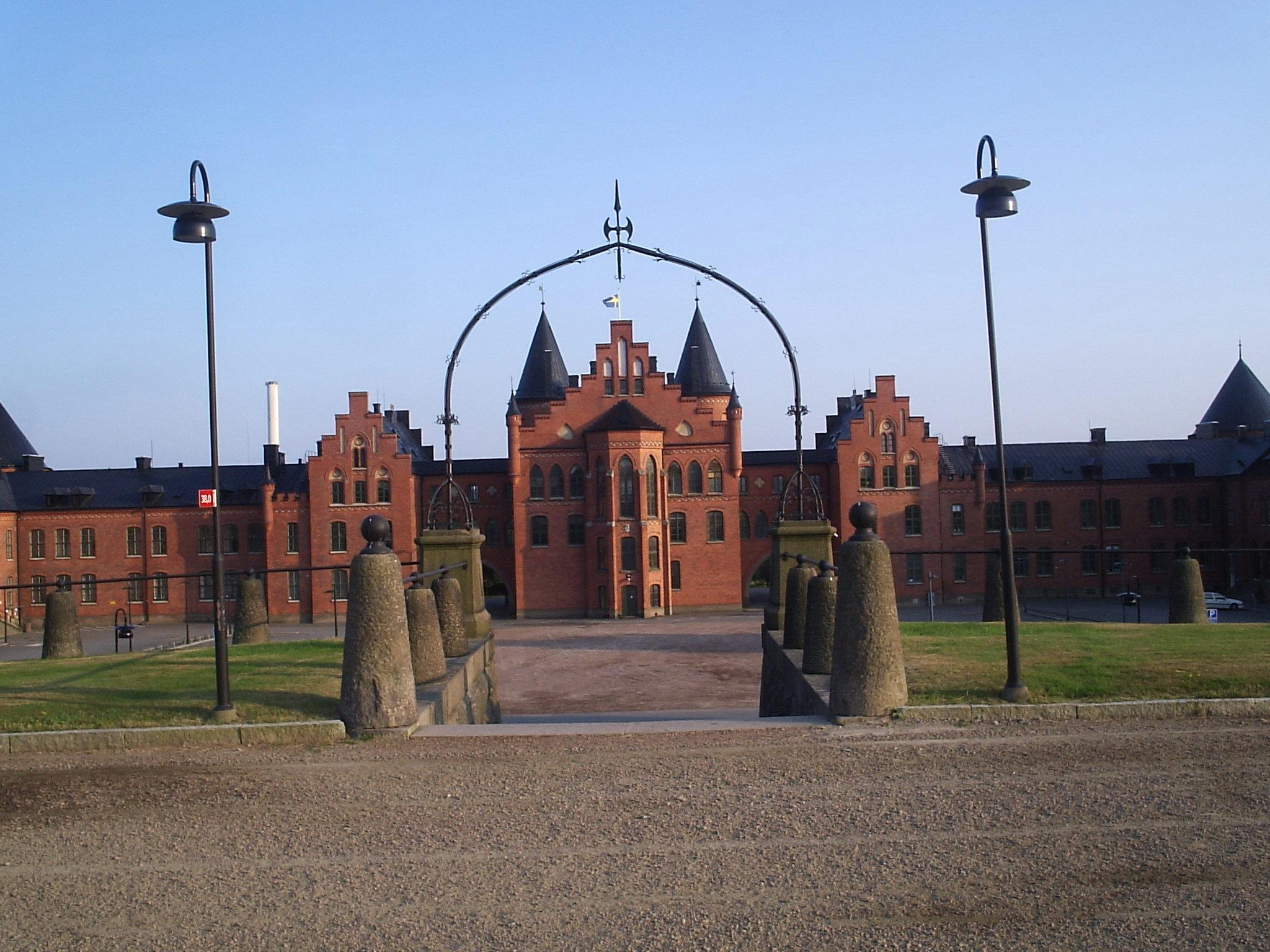
Kviberg barracks, Gothenburg

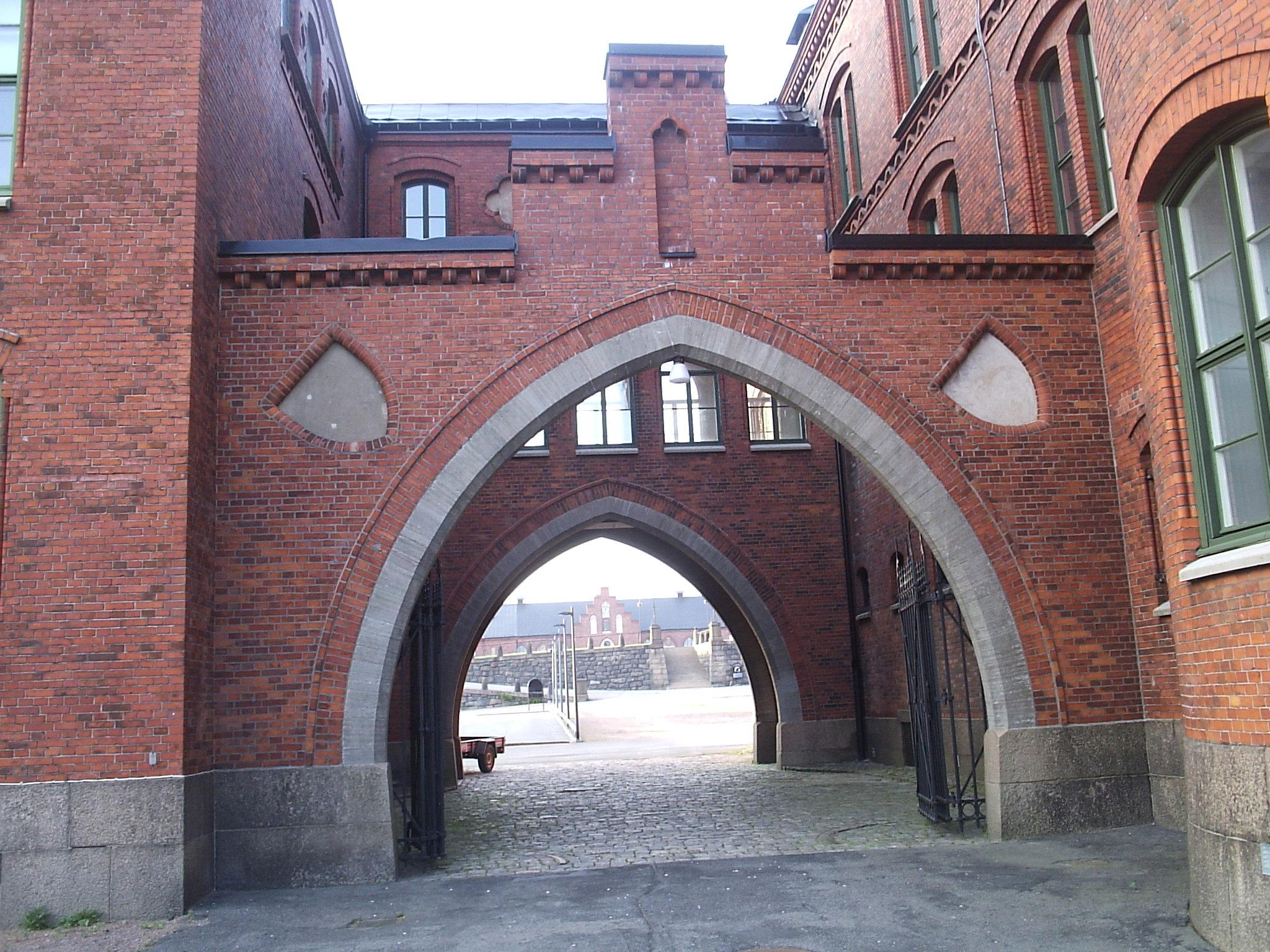
Kviberg barracks, Gothenburg

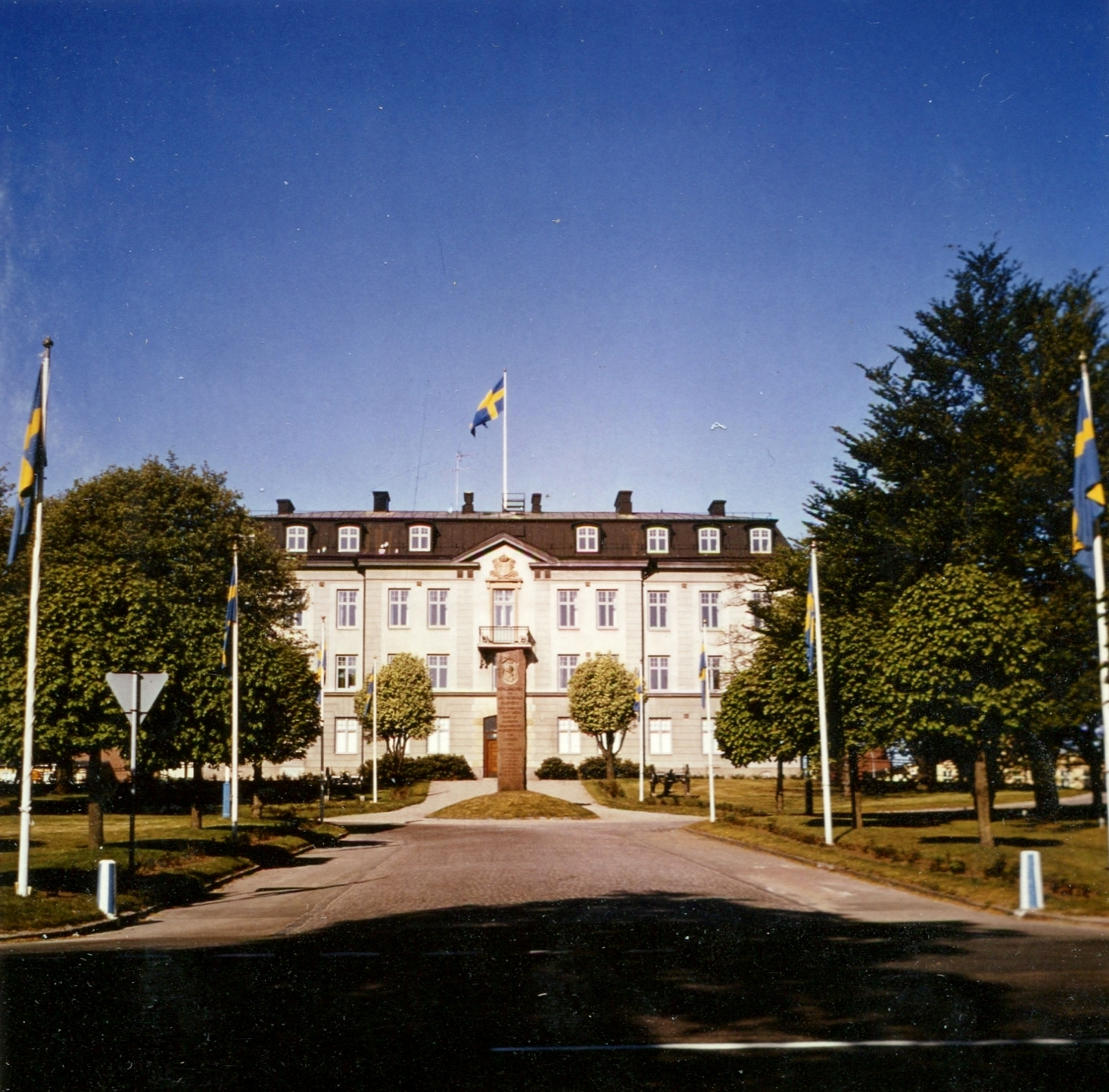
Chancellery building, Halmstad

=== Training areas ===
While the unit was located in Gothenburg, they trained at Vallda Sandö, Ringenäs training area and Sisjön training area. After moving to Halmstad, the unit started training at Mästocka training area and Nyårsåsen training area.

== Heraldry and traditions ==
=== Coat of arms ===
The coat of the arms of the unit from 1977 to 2000. Blazon: "Azur, the regimental badge, three waves bendy-sinister argent, charged with a doubletailed crowned lion rampant or, armed and langued gules, in dexter forepaw a sword or and in sinister a shield azure charged with three open crowns or placed two and one. The shield surmounted two gunbarrels of older pattern in saltire and two wings, both or".

The coat of the arms of the unit since 2000. Blazon: "Azure, the lesser coat of arms of Sweden, three open crowns or. The shield surmounted two gunbarrels of older pattern in saltire and two wings, both or".

Coat of arms 1977–2000

Coat of arms 2000–present

=== Colours, standards and guidons ===
On 6 June 1943, the military commander of the III Military District, major general Folke Högberg presented a standard to the Göta Anti-Aircraft Corps. On 1 April 1962, the Göta Anti-Aircraft Regiment took over Göta Artillery Regiment's (A 2) standard and since then it carries it as a traditional standard.

The regimental standard was drawn by Kristina Holmgård-Åkerberg and embroidered by hand in insertion technique by Maj-Britt Salander/company Blå Kusten. The standard was presented to the regiment in Halmstad by His Majesty the King Carl XVI Gustaf on 15 September 2001. Blazon: "On blue cloth in the centre the lesser coat of arms of Sweden, three open yellow crowns placed two and one. In the first corner the former badge of the regiment; a doubletailed rampant yellow lion with an open crown, in the right forepaw a yellow sword and in the left a blue shield with three open yellow crowns placed two and one; in the second corner the badge of Stockholm; a yellow Saint Erik head (a legacy from the former Roslagen Anti-Aircraft Regiment, Lv 3), in the third corner the provincial badge of Gotland; a white ram passant, arms and crosstaff yellow and a red banner with edging and five flaps in yellow (a legacy from the former Gotland Anti-Aircraft Corps, Lv 2) and in the fourth corner the town badge of Sundsvall; an open helmet over two musketforks in saltire, all white (a legacy from the former Sundsvall Air Defence Regiment, Lv 5). On the reverse side in the centre three open crowns placed two and one, in the upper inner corner two gunbarrels of older pattern in saltire (a legacy from the former Göta Artillery Regiment, A 2) and in the other corners the badge of the Air Defence Corps; two winged gunbarrels of older pattern in saltire, all yellow. Blue fringe."

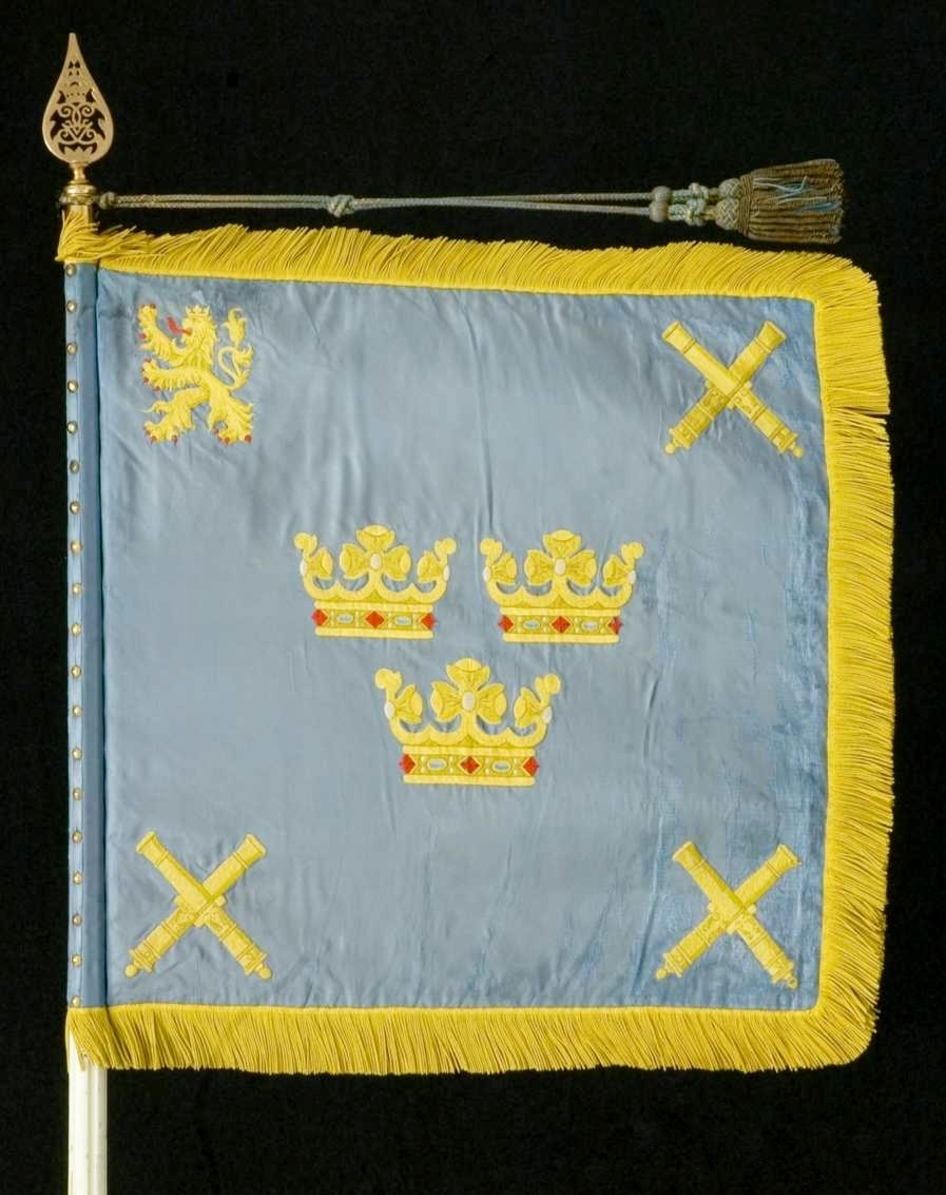
The 1943 standard.

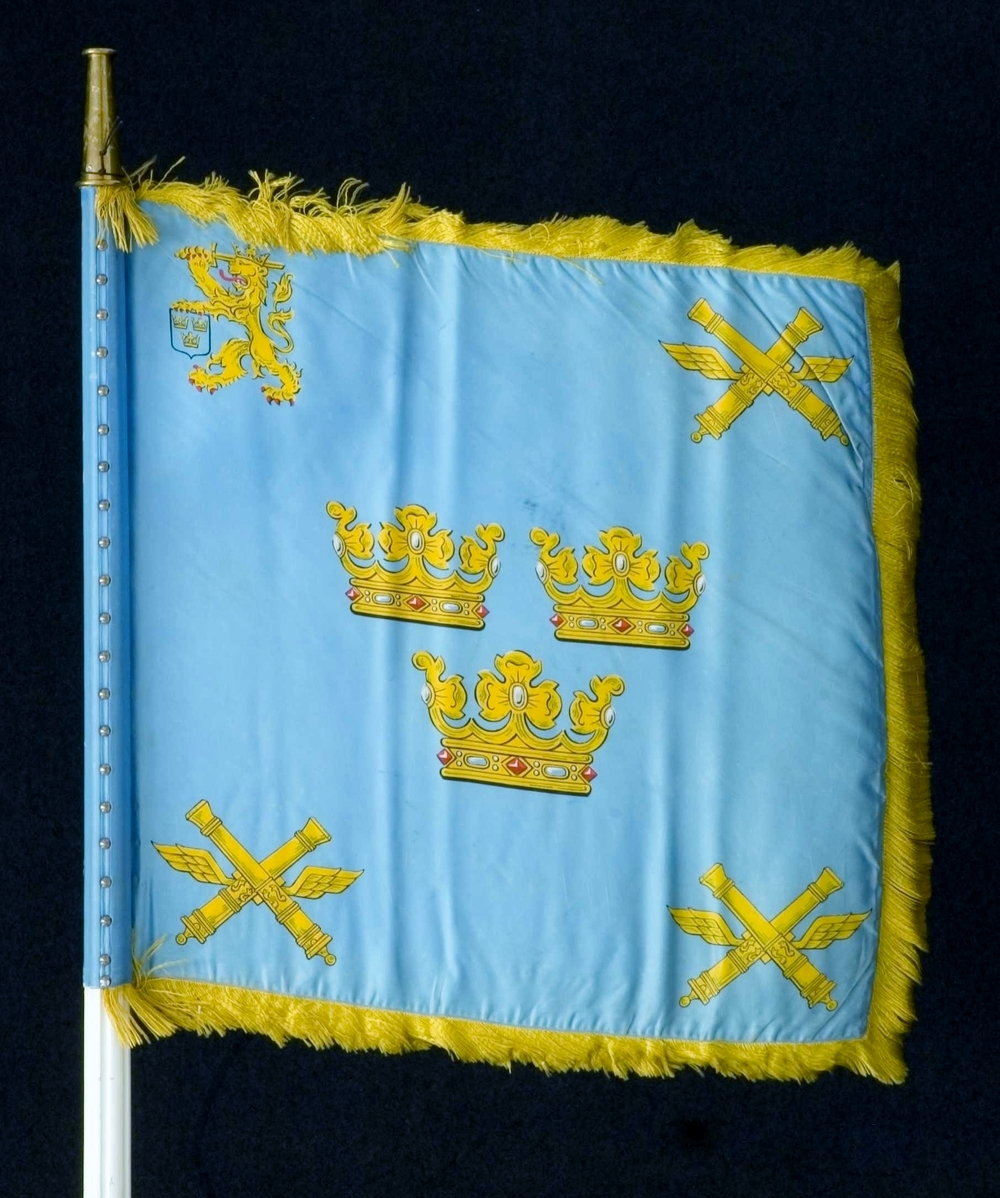
Guard standard.

=== Medals ===
In 2000, the Göta Anti-Aircraft Corps Commemorative Medal (GötalvkårMSM) was established. The medal is awarded for distinguished effort among junior personnel, at the Göta awards board's discretion. It is silver-colored, with the Anti-Aircraft Corps insignia on it. The ribbon is designed in a repeating pattern of orange and yellow.

In 2001, the Luftvärnsregementets (Lv 6) förtjänstmedalj ("Air Defence Regiment (Lv 6) Medal of Merit") in gold and silver (LvregGM/SM) of the 8th size was established. The medal ribbon is of red moiré with two white stripes on each side.

Göta Anti-Aircraft Corps Commemorative Medal

Ribbon bar of the Göta Anti-Aircraft Corps Commemorative Medal

Ribbon bar of the Air Defence Regiment Medal of Merit

== Commanding officers ==
Commanding officers since 1941:

- 1941–1942: ?
- 1942–1943: Curt Dahlgren
- 1943–1946: Bengt Bengtsson
- 1946–1948: Sten Odelberg
- 1948–1956: Niels Juel
- 1956–1966: Bertil Hård af Segerstad
- 1966–1976: Tore Stawström
- 1976–1978: Stig Lindskog
- 1978–1986: Sven Platerud
- 1986–1989: Svante Bergh
- 1989–1992: Hans Ahldén
- 1992–1993: Leif Gunnerhell
- 1993–1998: Peter Jonsson
- 1995–1996: Anders Börjesson (acting)
- 1998–2000: Göran Lindqvist
- 2000–2003: Jan-Erik Jakobsson
- 2003–2005: Kent Samuelsson
- 2005–2007: Göran Wahlqvist
- 2007–2012: Lennart Klevensparr
- 2012–2015: Stefan Jönsson
- 2015–2019: Anders Svensson (Note: Svensson assumed the post on 1 December 2015.)
- 2020–2024: Mikael Beck
- 3 May 2024–2026: Johan Jönsson
- 7 January 2026 – 20 April 2026: Lieutenant Colonel Jan Ohlson (acting)
- 27 April 2026–present: Colonel Sofia Westermark

== Names, designations and locations ==
Name	Translation	From		To
Kungl. Göteborgs luftvärnsdivision	Royal Gothenburg Air Defence Division; Royal Gothenburg Anti-Aircraft Division	1941-10-01	–	1942-09-30
Kungl. Göteborgs luftvärnskår	Royal Gothenburg Air Defence Corps; Royal Gothenburg Anti-Aircraft Corps	1942-10-01	–	1962-06-30
Kungl. Göta luftvärnsregemente	Royal Göta Air Defence Regiment; Royal Göta Anti-Aircraft Regiment	1962-07-01	–	1974-12-31
Göta luftvärnsregemente	Göta Air Defence Regiment; Göta Anti-Aircraft Regiment	1975-01-01	–	1994-06-30
Göta luftvärnskår	Göta Air Defence Corps; Göta Anti-Aircraft Corps	1994-07-01	–	2000-06-30
Luftvärnsregementet	Air Defence Regiment	2000-07-01	–	
Designation		From		To
A 9 G		1941-10-01	–	1942-09-30
Lv 6		1942-10-01	–	
Location		From		To
Gothenburg Garrison/Högsbo		1944-10-01	–	1962-03-31
Gothenburg Garrison/Kviberg		1962-04-01	–	1994-06-30
Halmstad Garrison		1994-07-01	–	

== See also ==
- List of Swedish anti-aircraft regiments
