= CCEP =

CCEP may refer to:

- Coca-Cola Europacific Partners, a British bottling company
- Coordinating Committee for Earthquake Prediction, a Japanese organisation
- Canadian Center for Emergency Preparedness, a Canadian non-profit organisation which ceased operations in 2014
- Companhia Central Peninsular dos Caminhos de Ferro de Portugal (CCeP), a 19th-century Portuguese railway company
- Center for Community Earthquake Preparedness, University of Mississippi School of Engineering, United States
- Centre for Climate Economics and Policy at the Australian National University Crawford School of Public Policy
- Certified Chiropractic Extremity Practitioner, a chiropractic credential
- Corporate Compliance & Ethics Professional, a certification for campus privacy officers
- C.C.E.P, a 1991 single by Sweet Exorcist
