= Roslagen Anti-Aircraft Corps =

- Roslagens luftvärnskår
- Active: 1939–2000
- Country: Sweden
- Allegiance: Swedish Armed Forces
- Branch: Swedish Army
- Type: Artillery (1939–1941); Anti-aircraft (1941–2000)
- Size: Corps
- Part of: Östgöta AA Artillery Reg. (1939–1941); IV Army Division (1941–1942); IV Military District (1942–1966); Eastern Military District (1966–1991); Middle Military District (1991–2000)
- Garrison/HQ: Norrtälje
- Colors: Red and blue
- March: "Under värnplikt" (Jacobsson) (Note: The march was adopted in 1942 and it was established in 1953 by Army Order 33/1953.)

Insignia
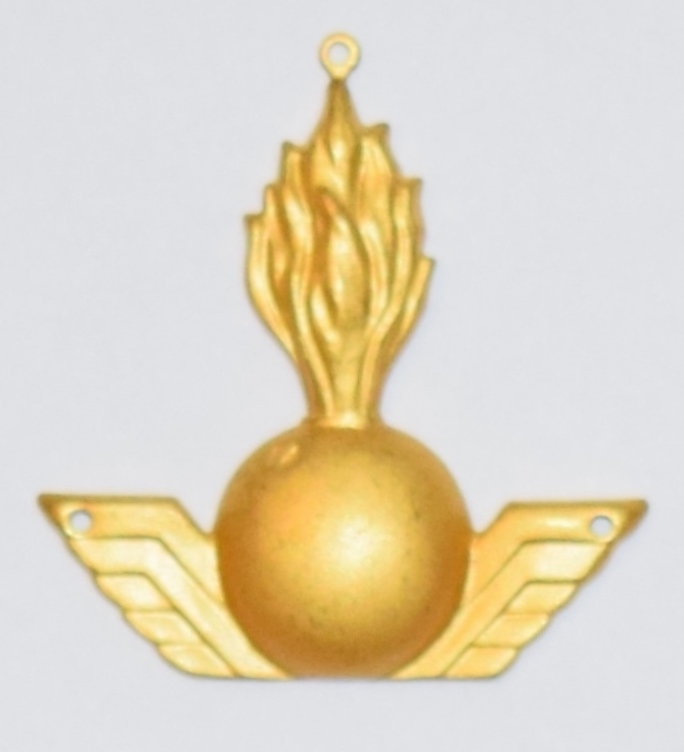
- Branch insignia

Roslagen Anti-Aircraft Corps (Swedish: Roslagens luftvärnskår), also Lv 3, was a Swedish Army anti-aircraft unit that was active in various forms 1939–2000. The unit was based in Norrtälje.

== History ==
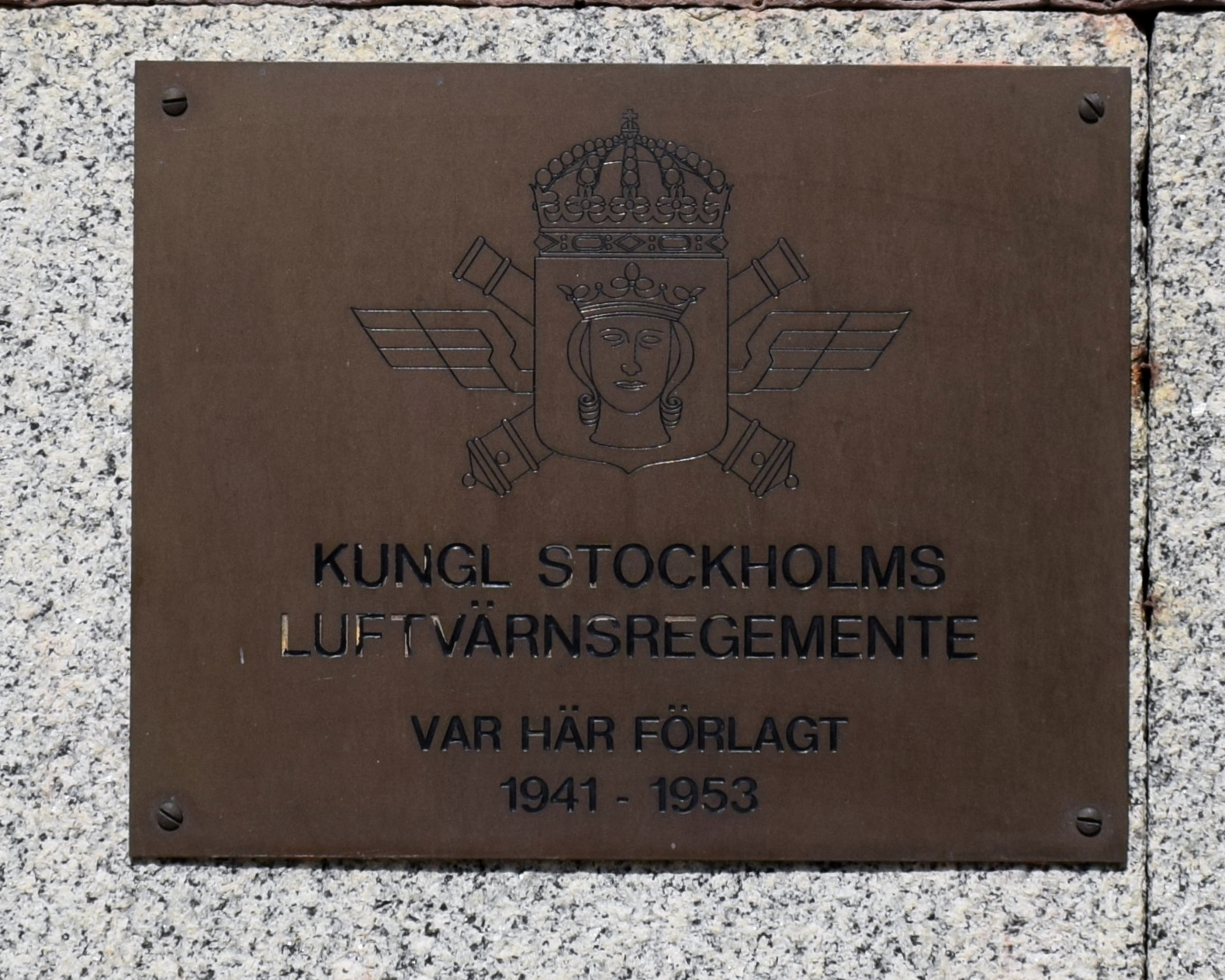
A commemorative plaque at Linnégatan 89 in Stockholm where Stockholm Anti-Aircraft Regiment was located from 1941 to 1953.

The unit was raised on 1 October 1939 in Stockholm as the Östgöta Anti-Aircraft Artillery Regiment's Detachment in Stockholm (A 10 S). On 1 October 1941, the detachment was separated from the Östgöta Anti-Aircraft Artillery Regiment and became an independent unit under the name of Stockholm Anti-Aircraft Regiment (A 11). As part of the Defence Act of 1942, the regiment was transferred in 1942 to the newly formed air defence military branch (Luftvärnstrupperna) as the Stockholm Anti-Aircraft Regiment (Lv 3). One battery from the regiment was detached to Gotland in 1944 under the designation Lv 3 G. On 1 July 1952 a relocation of the regiment began to Norrtälje, whereby the Gotland battery was transferred to Östgöta Anti-Aircraft Regiment (Lv 2) under the designation Lv 2 G. When the relocation to Norrtälje was fully completed the regiment changed name to the Roslagen Anti-Aircraft Regiment (Lv 3). In connection with the OLLI reform, which was carried out in the Swedish Armed Forces between 1973 and 1975, the Life Guard Dragoons (K 1) was amalgamated with Stockholm Defence District (Fo 44) and formed the defence district regiment K 1/Fo 44 in 1975. This resulted in Roslagen Anti-Aircraft Regiment, which was included in Stockholm Defence District, to become a B unit (training regiment), and its mobilization and material responsibilities were transferred to the Life Guard Dragoons, which became an A unit (defence district regiment, försvarsområdesregemente).

By the Defence Act of 1992, it was decided that all training regiments that did not raised war-time units of regimental size, should also not be called regiments. This was because the Swedish government felt that the basic organization would mirror the war organization. In connection with this, the regiment was reduced to a corps on 1 July 1994 and regained its old name Roslagen Anti-Aircraft Corps (Lv 3). By the Defence Act of 2000, the government considered that only four air defense battalions were needed in the future organization. What was clear prior to the Defence Act, was that Gotland Anti-Aircraft Corps (Lv 2) was to be disbanded and Norrland Anti-Aircraft Corps (Lv 7) to be reduced to one battalion and organize it under Norrbotten Regiment. This was because the operations of Gotland Anti-Aircraft Corps were considered too limited to be able to be developed into a single unit for the country's air defense. For Norrland Anti-Aircraft Corps, the government considered that it would result in serious loss of skills in the short perspective of locating the entire air defense function to Boden.

The choice was between keeping Roslagen Anti-Aircraft Corps (Lv 3) in Norrtälje or Göta Anti-Aircraft Corps (Lv 6) in Halmstad as the main alternative for future air defense training. The advantage of maintaining Roslagen Anti-Aircraft Corps was, among other things, good training areas and that the Air Defence Combat School (Luftvärnets stridsskola, LvSS) was located in Norrtälje, which also had an experimental site on Väddö training area. The disadvantage what could spurr a disbandment of Roslagen Anti-Aircraft Corps was the need to increase expertise for Robotsystem 77/97 surface-to-air missile system and that the corps was an isolated organizational unit with limited opportunities for garrison coordination. This was something that was considered to be an advantage for Göta Anti-Aircraft Corps, as it was already part of a garrison that housed both a military college and the Swedish Armed Forces' Halmstad Schools (Försvarsmaktens Halmstadsskolor, FMHS). At the same time, the government considered that it was necessary to consider that the corps was affected in the two previous Defence Acts, partly through the relocation from Gothenburg and partly by taking over parts of the air defense training from the Scanian Anti-Aircraft Corps (Lv 4), which was disbanded by the Defence Act of 1996. Göta Anti-Aircraft Corps on the other hand, had limited opportunities at Ringenäs training area as well as large investment costs in Halmstad to relocate the Air Defence Combat School to Halmstad.

However, the government decided that synergy effects with units and schools were best in Halmstad compared to Norrtälje. However, the government considered that the Roslagen Anti-Aircraft Corps had the best conditions for air defense training, from a purely air defense perspective, but the Göta Anti-Aircraft Corps was decided by the government to have sufficiently good conditions for continued air defense training. The government came, in its bill regarding the Defence Act of 2000, therefore, to disband Roslagen Anti-Aircraft Corps and maintain the Göta Anti-Aircraft Corps as it had greater and better opportunity for garrison coordination with an expanded infrastructure to cope with increased mechanization of the air defense. With the Defence Act the training of the air defense was concentrated to four air defense battalions, three in Halmstad and to Norrland Anti-Aircraft Battalion in Boden. As the Göta Anti-Aircraft Corps became a unified unit for the country's air defense, including three air defense battalions and the Air Defence Combat School, the corps was upgraded to regiment, and on 1 July 2000 adopted the new name Air Defence Regiment (Lv 6). The Roslagen Anti-Aircraft Corps was disbanded on 30 June 2000. From 1 July 2000, the operations went over to a decommissioning organization, called the Avvecklingsorganisation Norrtälje, until the disbandment was completed by 31 December 2001. The decommissioning organization was dissolved in turn on 30 June 2001, when the disbandment of the unit was completed.

== Locations and training areas ==
=== Barracks ===
When the unit was raised as the Stockholm Anti-Aircraft Regiment, it was located in Göta Life Guards' former barracks were on Linnégatan in Stockholm. On 7 April 1952, the regiment began to move into a newly erected barracks area in Norrtälje. On 25 March 1952, the regiment had a farewell ceremony in Stockholm, but the Swedish naval ensign was not hoisted until 5 March 1953, when the staff was also relocated to Norrtälje. In Norrtälje, the regiment had a moving-in ceremony on 8 March 1952. Although not all parts were in place in Norrtälje until March 1953, the regiment officially began operations in Norrtälje on 1 October 1952.

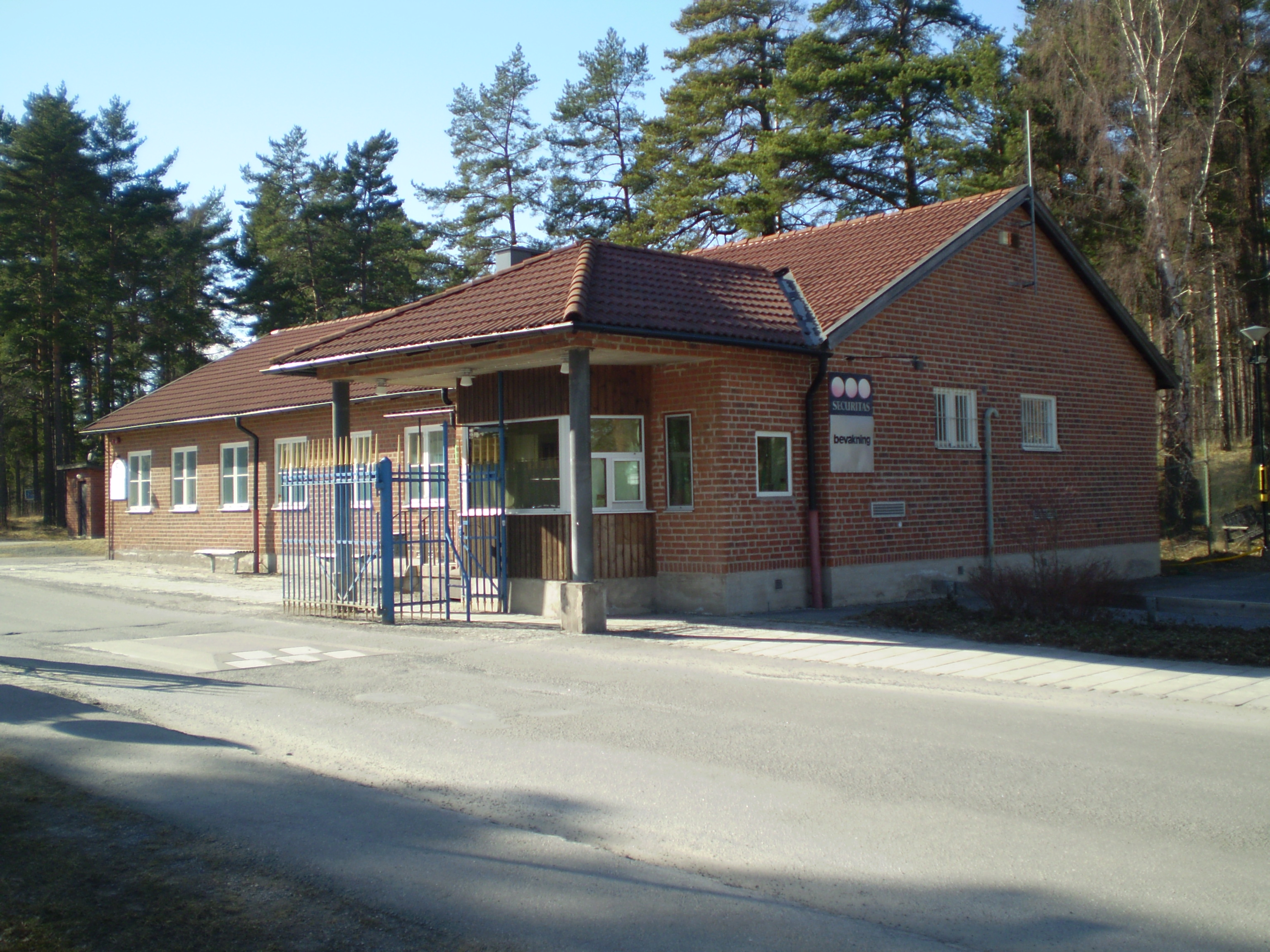
Guardhouse

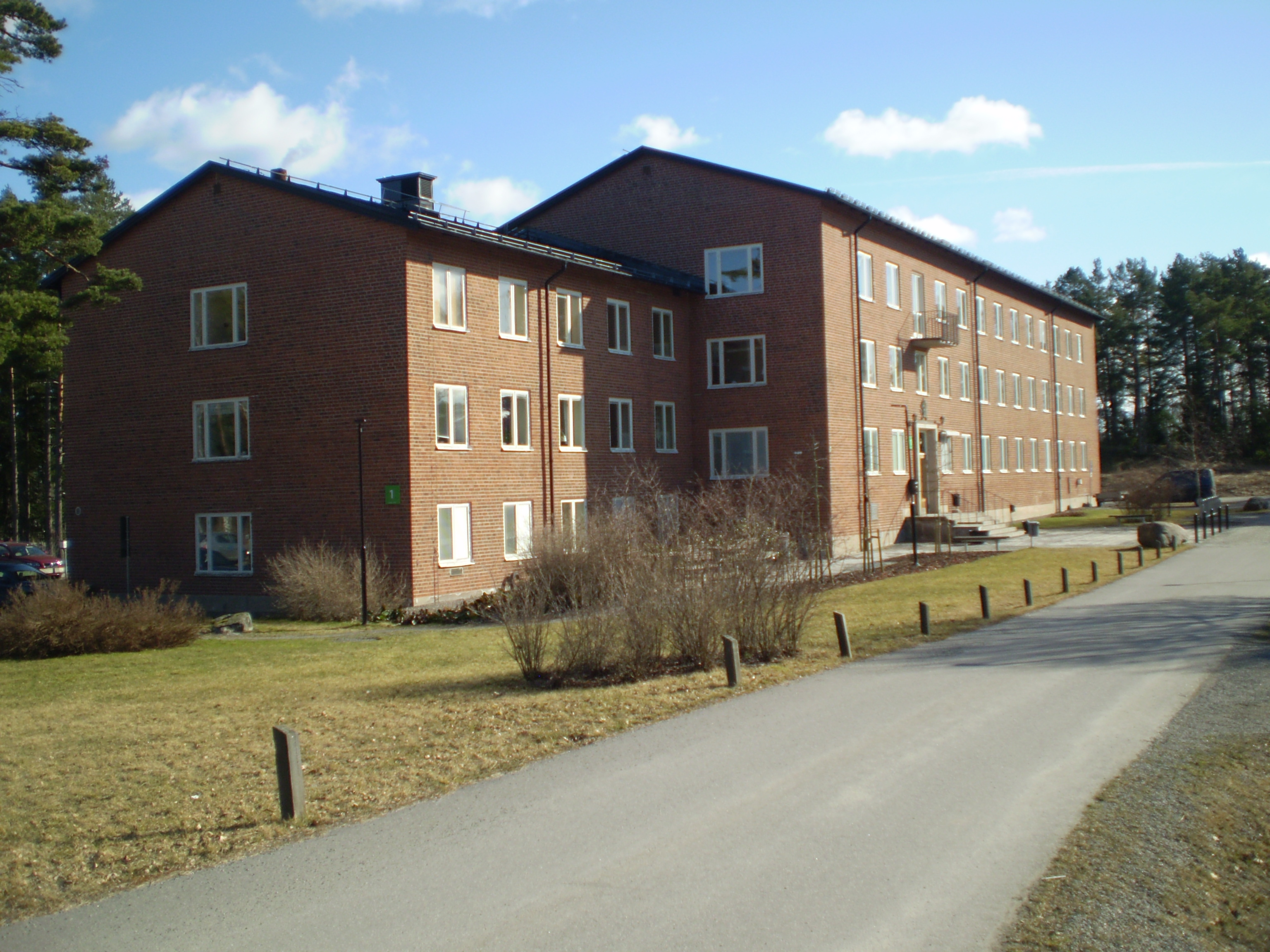
Chancellery

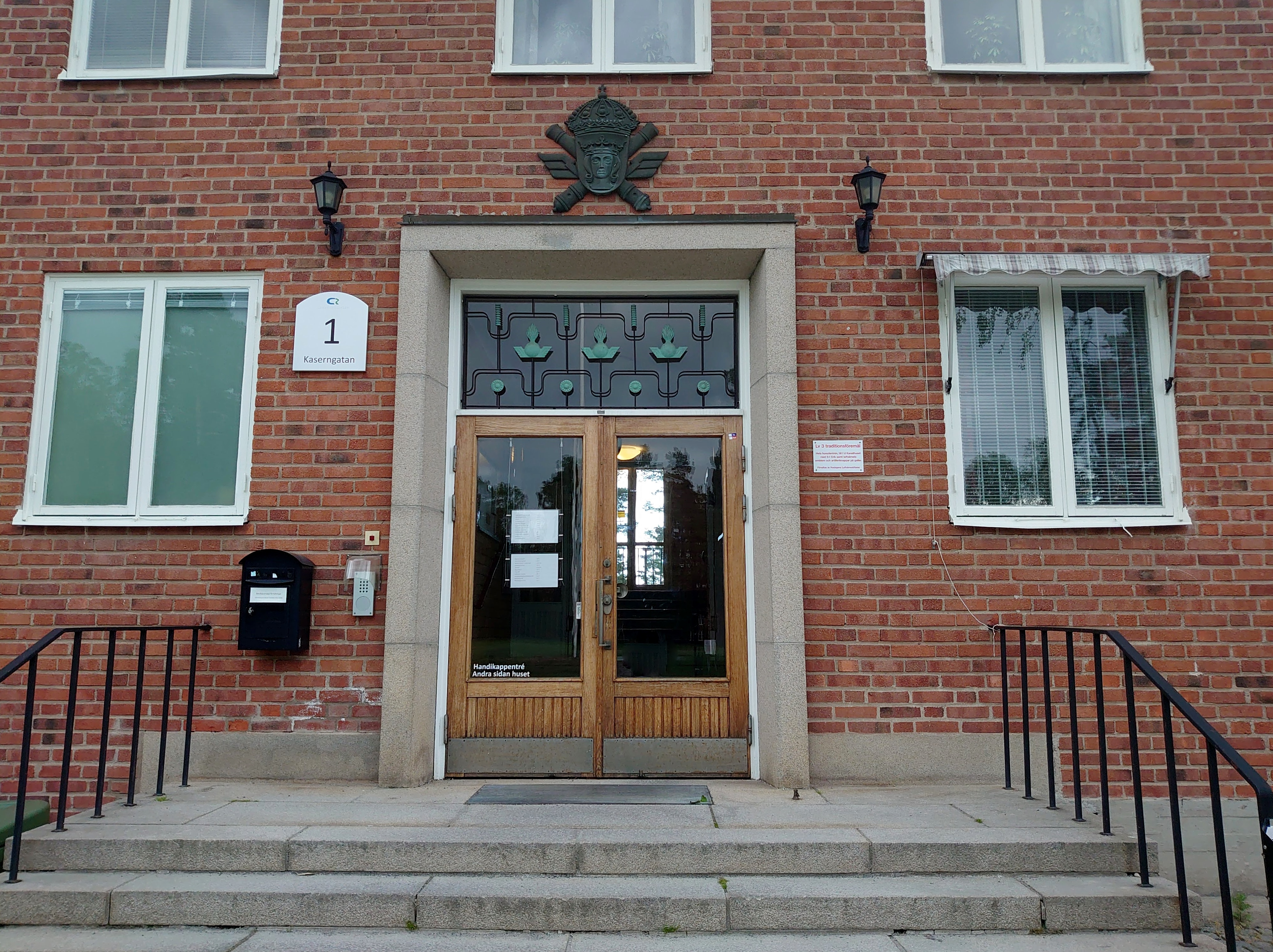
Entrance to chancellery

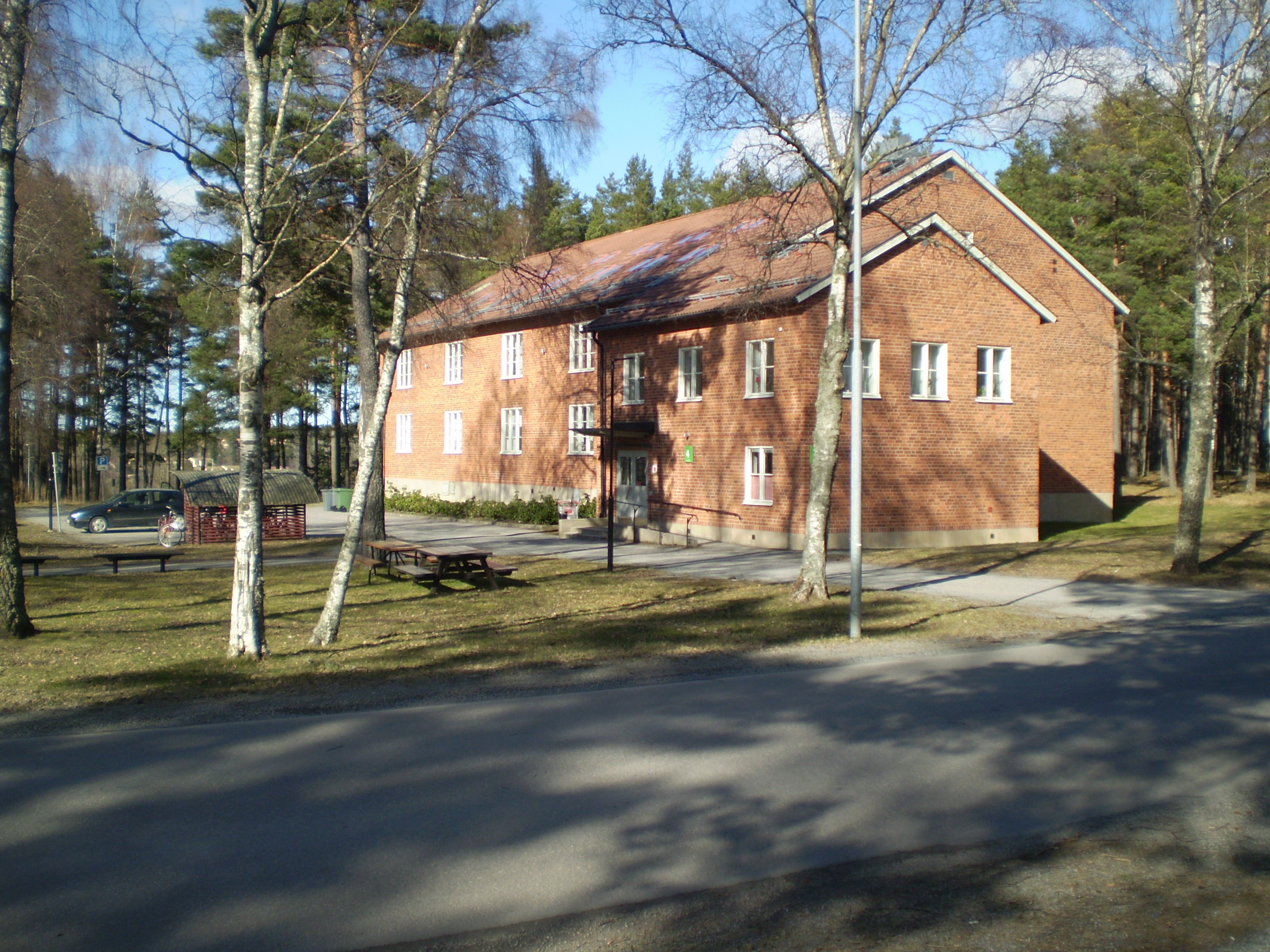
Barracks

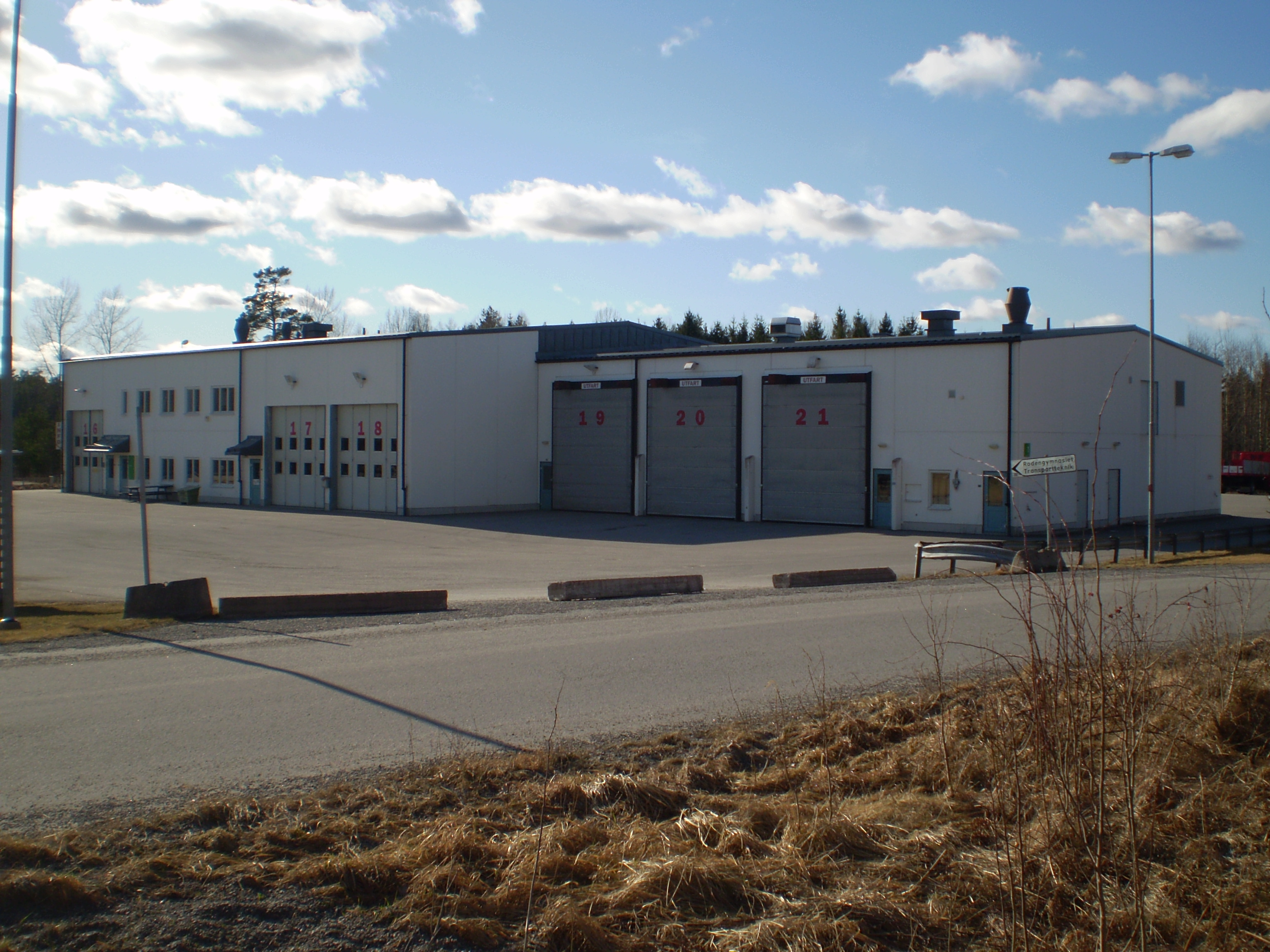
Workshop and garage

=== Detachment ===
On 1 April 1944, the air defense on Gotland was transferred from the Coastal Artillery to the Stockholm Anti-Aircraft Regiment, which formed the detachment of Stockholm Anti-Aircraft Regiment's Battery on Gotland (Lv 3 G). The detachment was located on Söderväg in southwest Visby. In 1945, the detachment moved to barracks 2 and 3, which were erected the same year at the Gotland Artillery Corps (A 7) barracks area on Östra Hansegatan. From 1 November 1952, the detachment was transferred to the Östgöta Anti-Aircraft Regiment (Lv 2).

=== Training areas ===
Nordrona. The Roslagen Anti-Aircraft Corps used the area east of the barracks area. Because the Nordrona area in the east and north is bounded by Lake Lommaren, in the south by E18 and in the west by the barracks area, it was difficult for the public to get to the area when there was no exercise. At Nordrona there was, among other things, a courtyard for motor training and a short-range shooting range.

Mellingeholm. South of Norrtälje, between County Road 276 towards Åkersberga and Lake Limmaren, Roslagen Anti-Aircraft Corps had an area called Mellingeholm. At Mellingeholm there was a shooting range, hand grenade range and several places for different types of fire control and intelligence units as well as staff and tross units.

Väddö. Väddö training area is located at Ytterskär on Väddö, and was the most frequently used training area during live fire exercises with the air defense units.

== Heraldry and traditions ==
=== Coat of arms ===
The coat of arms of the unit was used from 1977 to 2000. Blazon: "Azure, the badge of Stockholm, the crowned head of Saint Eric couped or. The shield surmounted two gunbarrels of older pattern in saltire and two wings, both or."

=== Colours, standards and guidons ===
In 1942, the units was presented with its standard by His Majesty the King Gustaf V.

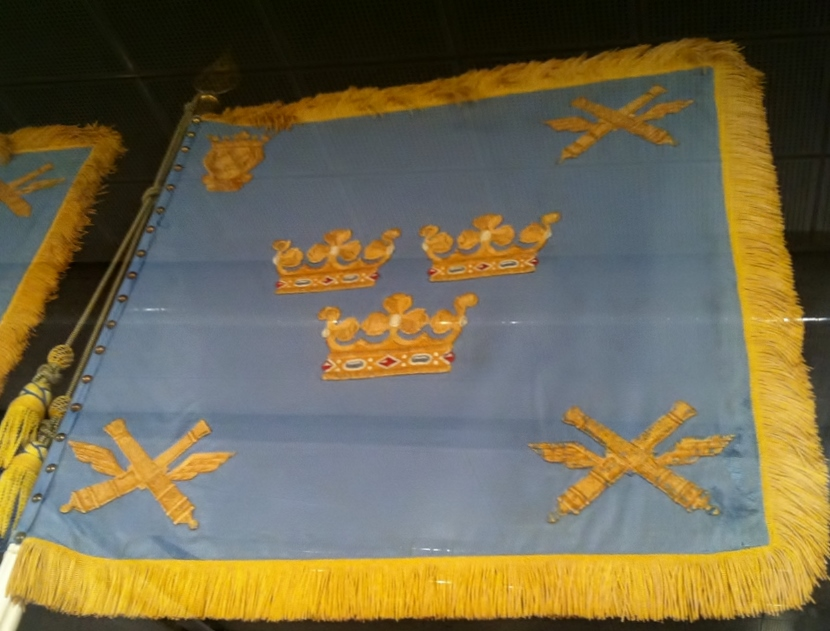
Standard

=== Medals ===
In 2000, the Roslagens luftvärnskårs (Lv 3) minnesmedalj ("Roslagen Anti-Aircraft Corps (Lv 3) Commemorative Medal") in silver (RoslvkSMM) of the 8th size was established. The medal ribbon is of blue moiré with red edges followed by a white stripe. A Saint Eric head is attached to the ribbon.

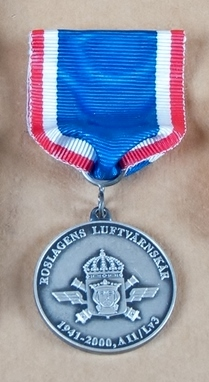
Roslagen Anti-Aircraft Corps (Lv 3) Commemorative Medal

Ribbon bar with device

== Commanding officers ==
Regimental commanders and corps commander from 1941 to 2000.

- 1941–1949: COL Hugo Stendahl
- 1949–1956: COL Edward Malm
- 1956–1964: COL Sven Hådell
- 1964–1971: COL Birger Olin
- 1971–1978: COL Per Sundh
- 1978–1980: COL Roland Grahn
- 1980–1988: COL Stig Prinzell
- 1988–1993: COL Torsten Törnqvist
- 1993–1995: COL Stig Schyldt
- 1995–2000: COL Gerhard Lilliestierna

== Names, designations and locations ==
Name	Translation	From		To
Kungl. Östgöta luftvärnsartilleriregementes detachement i Stockholm	Royal Östgöta Anti-Aircraft Artillery Regiment Detachment in Stockholm	1939-10-01	–	1941-09-30
Kungl. Stockholms luftvärnsartilleriregemente	Royal Stockholm Anti-Aircraft Artillery Regiment	1941-10-01	–	1942-09-30
Kungl. Stockholms luftvärnsregemente	Royal Stockholm Anti-Aircraft Regiment	1942-10-01	–	1957-06-30
Kungl. Roslagens luftvärnsregemente	Royal Roslagen Anti-Aircraft Regiment	1957-07-01	–	1974-12-31
Roslagens luftvärnsregemente	Roslagen Anti-Aircraft Regiment	1975-01-01	–	1994-06-30
Roslagens luftvärnskår	Roslagen Anti-Aircraft Corps	1994-07-01	–	2000-06-30
Avvecklingsorganisation Norrtälje	Decommissioning Organisation Norrtälje	2000-07-01	–	2001-06-30
Designation		From		To
A 10 S		1939-10-01	–	1941-09-30
A 11		1941-10-01	–	1942-09-30
Lv 3		1942-10-01	–	2000-06-30
Ao No		2000-07-01	–	2001-06-30
Location		From		To
Stockholm Garrison		1939-10-01	–	1953-03-05
Norrtälje Garrison		1952-10-01	–	2001-06-30

== See also ==
- List of Swedish anti-aircraft regiments
