= Preparedness =

Precautionary measures in the face of potential disasters

Preparedness is a set of actions that are taken as precautionary measures in the face of potential disasters. Being prepared helps in achieving goals and in avoiding and mitigating negative outcomes.

There are different types of preparedness, such as public health preparedness and local emergency preparedness or snow preparedness, but probably the most developed type is "disaster preparedness", defined by the United Nations as involving "forecasting and taking precautionary measures before an imminent threat when warnings are possible". This includes not only natural disasters, but all kinds of severe damage caused in a relatively short period, including warfare.

Preparedness is a major phase of emergency management, and is particularly valued in areas of competition such as sport, military science and SRF cryomodule assembly.

Methods of preparation include research, estimation, planning, resourcing, education, practicing, and rehearsing.

== Organizations promoting emergency preparedness ==
In Canada, the Center for Preparedness is a federally incorporated, not-for-profit organization that promotes preparedness.

In the United States, the American Red Cross, a non-profit organization, provides disaster preparedness education.

These and other various organizations around the world may provide emergency kits and training.

== Preparedness as a whole community activity ==
In the United States, before Hurricane Katrina, the responsibility for emergency preparedness fell upon local first responders and other local emergency services. In the aftermath of Katrina, it became evident that first responders can and will become overwhelmed in a large-scale disaster; unable to effectively respond to the emergency.

In 2011, the Federal Emergency Management Agency (FEMA) proposed a "Whole Community Approach" to emergency management. This approach includes individuals, families, businesses, faith-based and community groups, profitable groups, schools and academia, media outlets, and all levels of governments and assigns them a role in preparedness efforts.

== Legislation ==
In the United States, legislation such as the Pandemic and All-Hazards Preparedness Reauthorization Act, and the Public Response and Emergency Preparedness (PREP) Act were enacted to develop the emergency personnel, procedures, drills, and plans needed in the event of an emergency.

== See also ==
- American Preppers Network
- "Be Prepared" – Motto of the Scout movement
- Business continuity planning – Prevention and recovery from threats that might affect a company
- Civil defense – Protection of citizens from disasters and military attack
- Community Emergency Response Team – American emergency response program
- Disaster recovery – Maintaining or reestablishing vital information technology infrastructure
- Disaster recovery and business continuity auditing – Validating efficacy of recovery plans
- Earthquake preparedness – Measures taken to minimize the effect of earthquakes
- Emergency management – Dealing with all humanitarian aspects of emergencies
- Everyday carry – Useful items carried on person every day
- Hurricane preparedness – Planning and actions to deal with a tropical cyclone strike
- Preparedness (learning)
- Preparedness Day – Political campaign to strengthen the U.S. military after the outbreak of World War I
- Preparedness Movement – Political campaign to strengthen the U.S. military after the outbreak of World War I
- Project management – Practice of leading the work of a team to achieve goals and criteria at a specified time
- Risk management – Identification, evaluation and control of risks
- Survivalism – Movement of individuals or households preparing for emergencies and natural disasters
