= Högsbo =

City district of Gothenburg, Sweden

Coordinates: 57.671°N 11.927°E

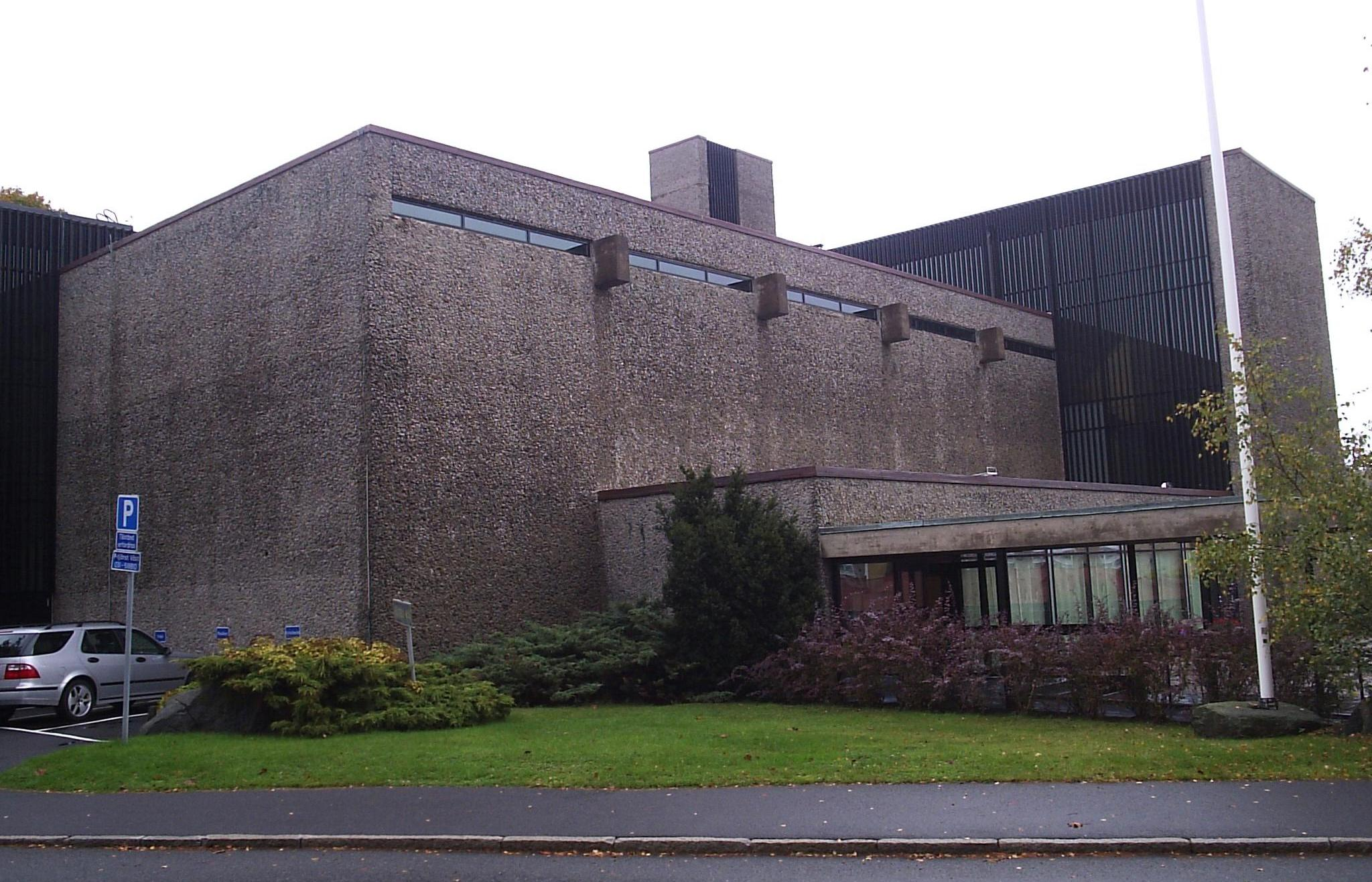
Church in Högsbo (2005)

Högsbo is a city district of Gothenburg, a city in the European country of Sweden.

Located on the Swedish west coast, Högsbo is situated southwest of the city centre of Gothenburg.

The centre of Högsbo is Axel Dahlströms torg which consists of a small shopping square and connections with the Västtrafik tram system.
