= American Preppers Network =

The American Preppers Network (APN) is a non-profit corporation and part of a growing international movement of people who call themselves preppers. The social network is organized by state and regional blogs and forums. The members are volunteer contributors who are dedicated to providing free information on survival skills, preparedness, self-sufficiency and sustainability.

The network of blogs is based on the concept originally created by Riverwalker of Stealth Survival who founded the first Preppers Network, Texas Preppers Network. The social network is composed of a variety of media that include chatrooms, forums, social networking pages, and a preparedness directory; Prepper.org.

The organization has also formed alliances with independent affiliates such as Pioneer Living Survival Magazine, a homesteading and survival skills website which provides a range of advice for those who just want to store extra food in case of a power cut, to those who want to embrace the "off the grid" lifestyle of America's western pioneers a blog that showcases survival and preparedness blogs across the web. In addition to the affiliates, the group also supports several independent homesteading, survival and preparedness sites such as Prepper Podcast John Milandred, Ready Nutrition, and The Survival Mom.

The individuals involved in the prepper network prefer to be called preppers instead of survivalists because they are regular people with normal lifestyles and jobs who prepare for a variety of reasons whether natural or man-made.

A unique difference that sets the network of preppers apart from their survivalist counterparts is the growing number of women involved in the movement
