= University of Mississippi School of Engineering =

Coordinates: 34.364619°N 89.536076°W

The University of Mississippi School of Engineering was officially established in 1900 as part of the University of Mississippi in the U.S. state of Mississippi. In 1854 the Board of Trustees established a department of engineering at the University of Mississippi to complement a strong program in the natural sciences. It is considered the oldest school of engineering in the state of Mississippi.

== Research centers ==
- Center for Advanced Infrastructure Technology (CAIT)
- Composite Materials Research Group (CMRG)
- Center for Community Earthquake Preparedness (CCEP)
- Geoinformatics Center
- Institute for Advanced Education in GeoSpatial Sciences
- Mississippi Mineral Resources Institute and Center for Marine Resources and Environmental Technology (MMRI-CMRET)
- National Center for Computational Hydroscience and Engineering (NCCHE)

== Facilities ==
The first four facilities are located on the "Circle" adjacent to the Lyceum. Weir Hall is located next to the J. D. Williams Library. The four primary engineering buildings are planned for an extensive renovation as part of the "Campaign for Engineering" being conducted.

- Anderson Hall
- Carrier Hall
- Old Chemistry
- Dr. Charles E. Smith Engineering Sciences Building
- Weir Hall (Computer Science)
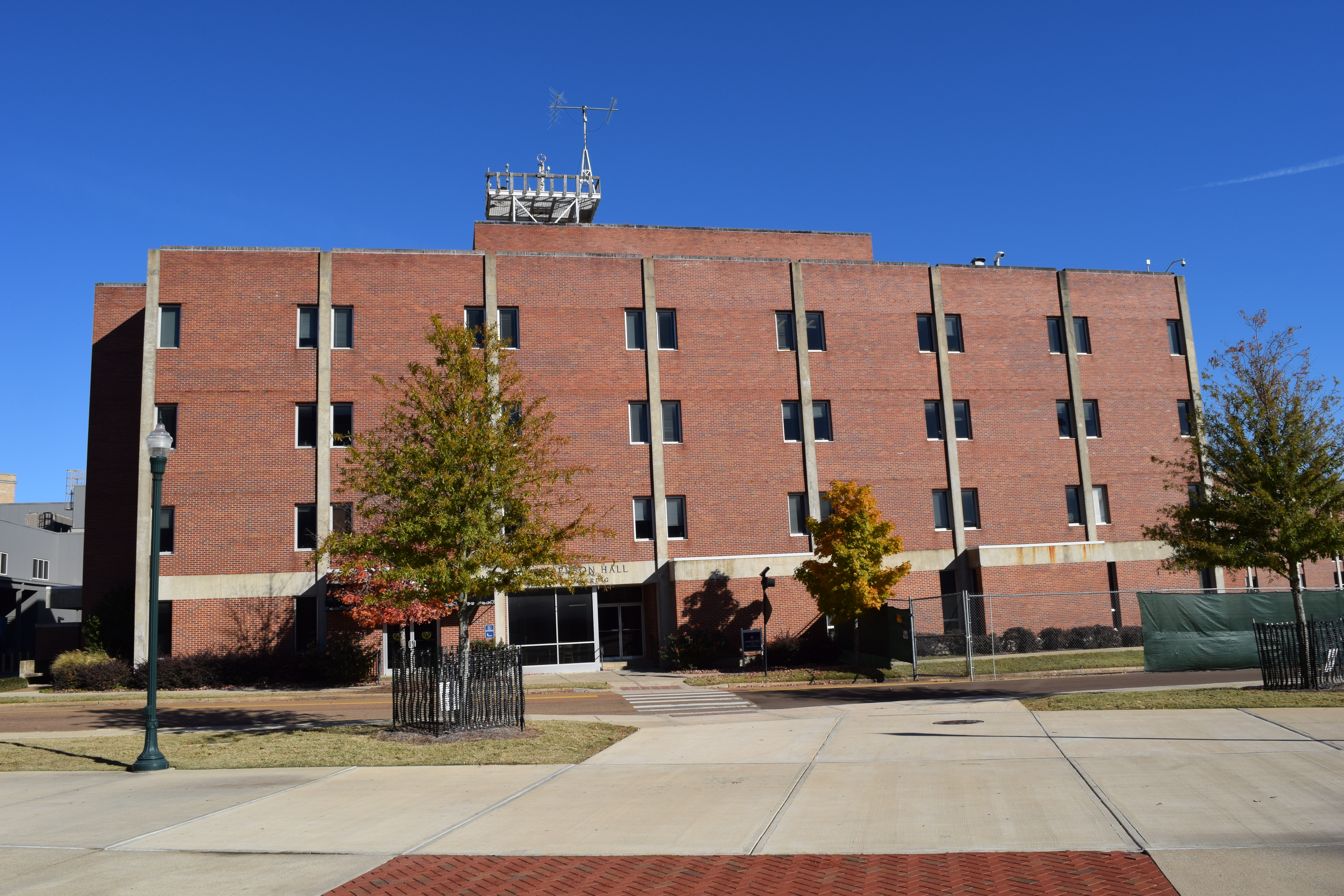
Anderson Hall

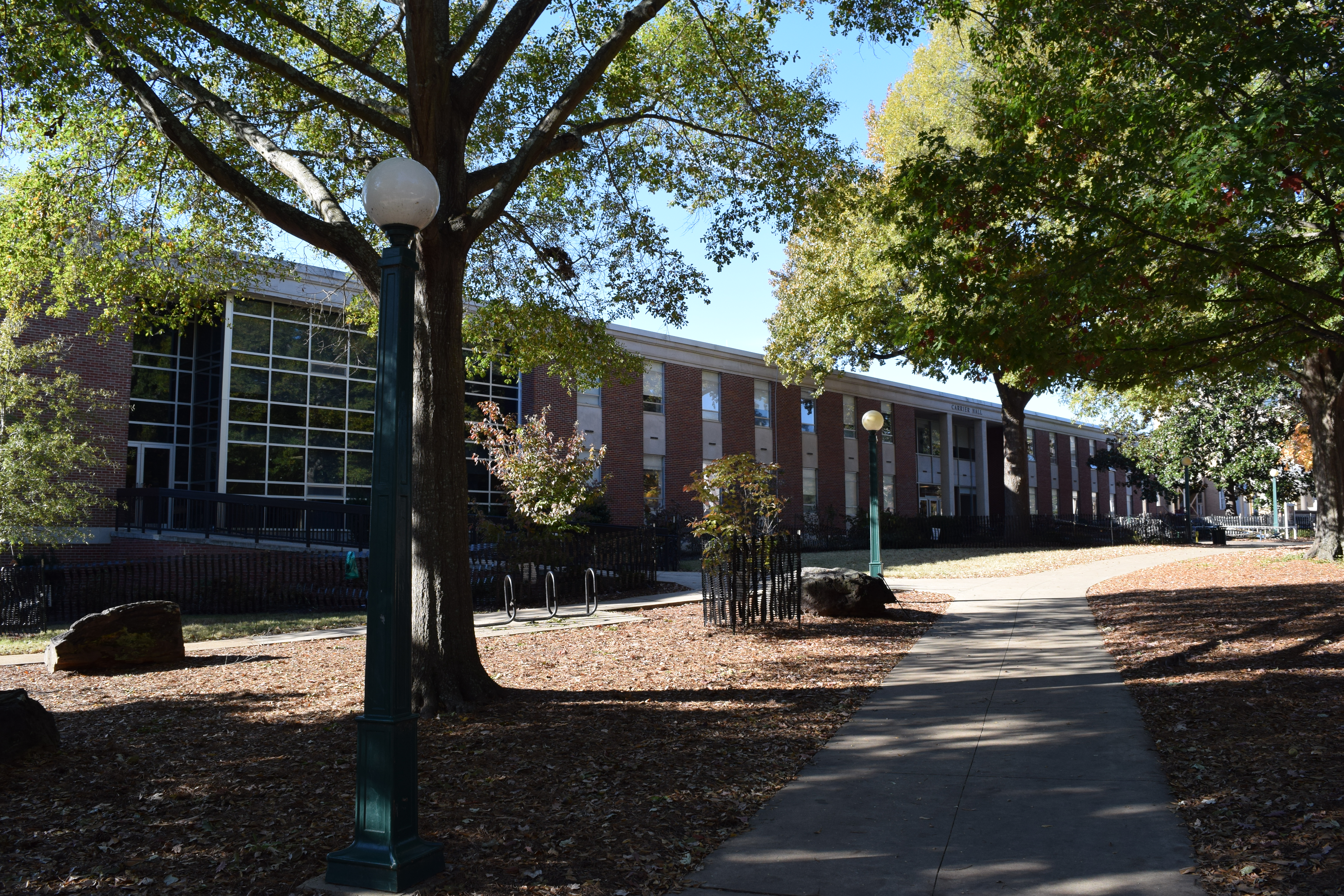
Carrier Hall

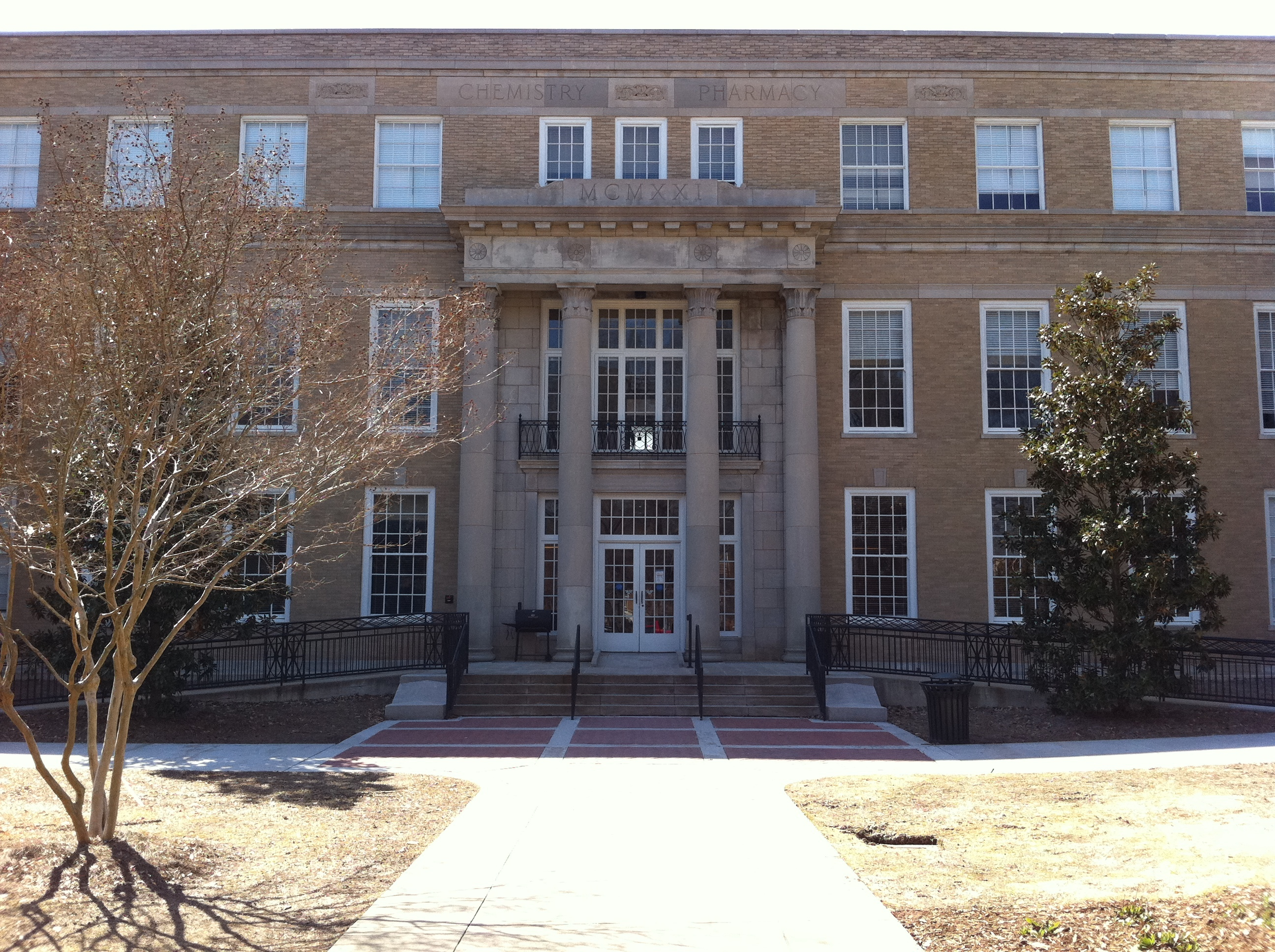
Chemistry building

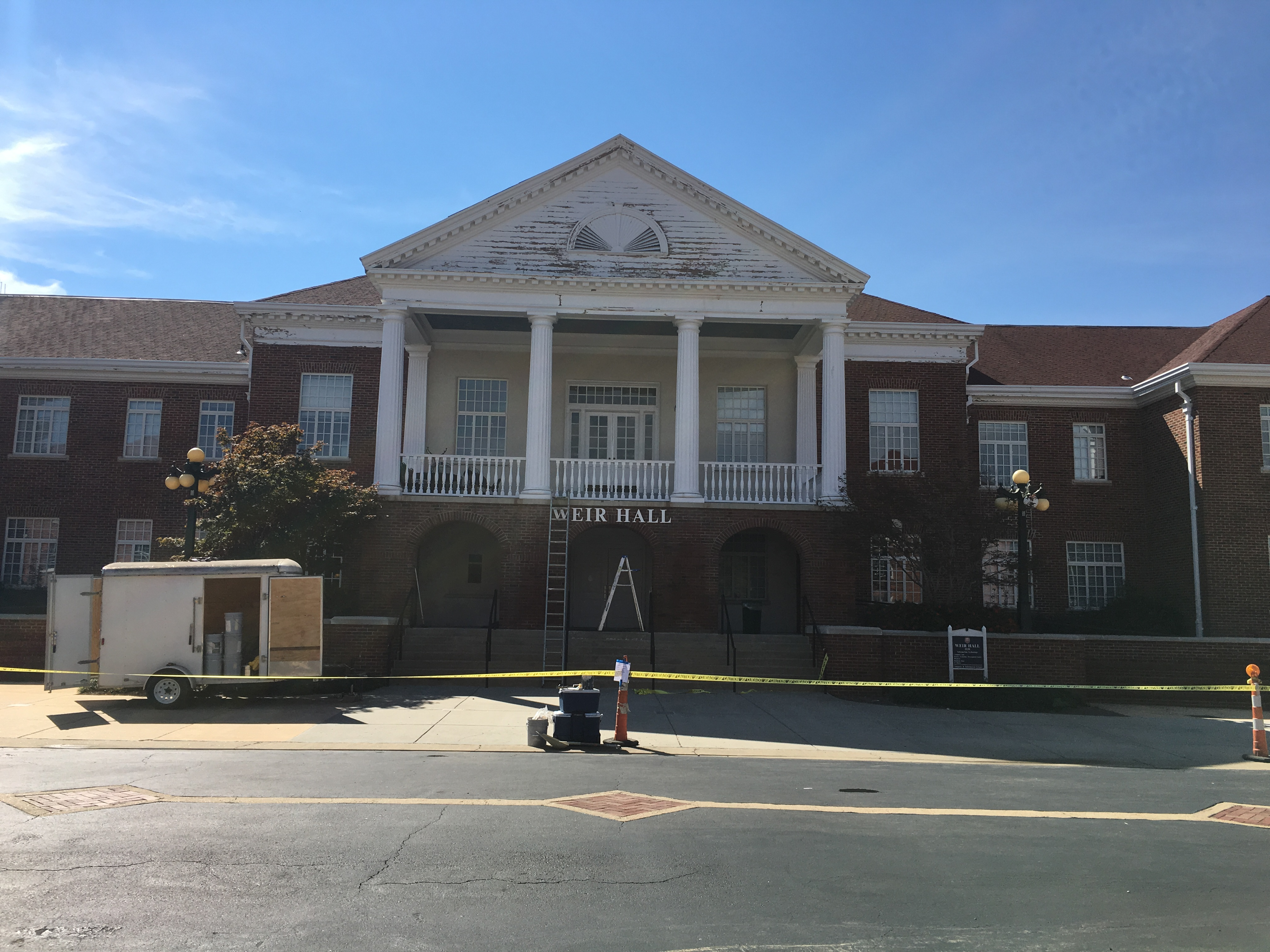
Weir Hall

== Deans of School of Engineering ==
- Alfred Hume 1900–1908
- Walter Hugh Drane 1908–1911
- John Hazard Dorrah 1911–1931
- Alfred Hume 1931–1933 (Acting)
- Andrew Broadus Hargis 1933–1937
- Lee H. Johnson 1937–1950
- Frederick H. Kellogg 1950–1964
- Karl Brenkert, Jr 1964–1979
- Allie M. Smith 1979–2000
- James G. Vaughan 2000-2000 (Acting)
- Kai-Fong Lee 2001–2009
- Alexander Cheng 2009–2018
- David Puleo 2018-Present

== Accreditation ==
Five programs in the School of Engineering at the University of Mississippi are accredited by the Engineering Accreditation Commission (EAC) Accreditation Board for Engineering and Technology (ABET). These programs will be accredited through the next general review in the 2016-2017 academic year.

- Chemical Engineering (BSChE – 1954)
- Civil Engineering (BSCE – 1949)
- Electrical Engineering (BSEE – 1969)
- Geological Engineering (BSGE – 1987)
- Mechanical Engineering (BSME – 1959)
- Biomedical Engineering (BSBME – 2017)

In addition, the School of Engineering also offers a B. S. degree in Computer Science (BSCS) that is accredited by the Computer Accreditation Commission (CAC) of ABET. This program will be accredited through the next general review in the 2008–2009 academic year.

== Notable professors and alumni ==
- William W. Parsons – Director of NASA's Kennedy Space Center
