= Coat of arms of Stockholm =

Coat of arms of Stockholm; Stockholms stadsvapen
- Armiger: City of Stockholm

The coat of arms of Stockholm the head of the Swedish king Saint Erik. The present arms developed from a city seal depicting Saint Erik, the earliest known impression of which dates from 1376.

== Overview ==
Blue and yellow are the colours of Stockholm reflecting the blue and gold of the city's Coat of arms.

According to legend, Saint Erik reigned as king for only four years, but became an important figure in Swedish tradition. He is regarded as the patron saint of both Sweden and its capital, Stockholm.

== Gallery ==
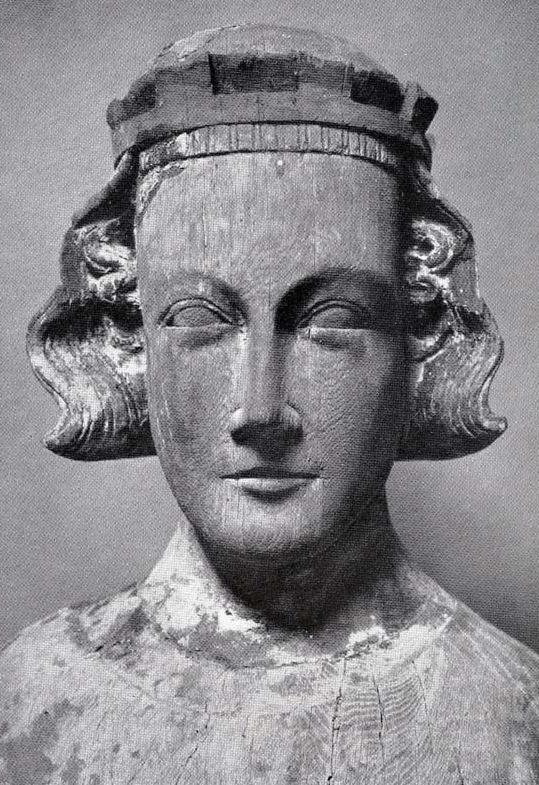
Statue of King Eric IX Jedvardsson (Saint Erik) that served as a model for the coat of arms of Stockholm

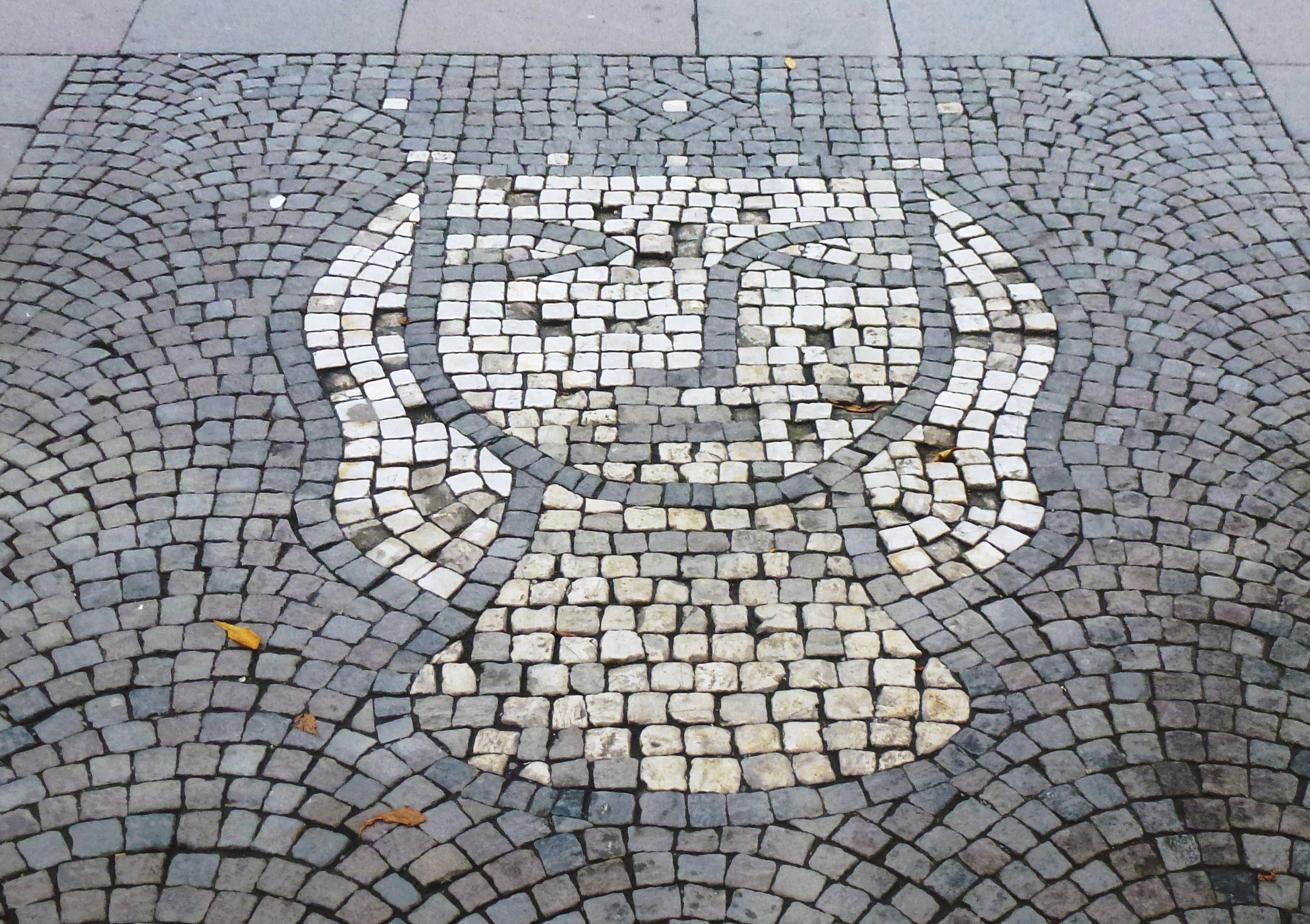
Saint Eric in the paving at Medborgarplatsen

== See also ==
- Coat of arms of Sweden
