= Canadian Center for Emergency Preparedness =

Canadian not-for-profit organization

The Canadian Centre for Emergency Preparedness (CCEP) was a Canadian, federally incorporated, not-for-profit organization that encouraged and promoted disaster management elements and practices to organizations, communities, and individuals in both the public and private sectors. CCEP's aim was to reduce the risk, impact and cost of disasters. CCEP was established in 1993. In 2013, it ceased operations and transferred its assets to the Emergency Management and Public Safety Institute (EMPSI) of Centennial College, Toronto, Ontario. It formally dissolved on January 22, 2014.

== Objectives ==
CCEP's main objectives are to increase risk and disaster awareness, promote the need for appropriate disaster management plans; and communicate information on the availability of resources, expertise, and technology. CCEP also supports working towards a more disruption resilient global economy by influencing public and government policy.

The core philosophy of CCEP is to ensure that organizations and individuals in their respective sectors have the ability to mitigate disruptions that affect economic sustainability/viability, thus affecting the health of global economies as a whole.

== Individual preparedness ==
CCEP supports GetPrepared, a federal program that provides individuals with tools and templates to develop a family emergency plan and create an emergency kit.

== Small business preparedness ==
CCEP offers a program called B-ReadyNow that guides small business owners through risk awareness practices for their business. The program provides resources to help small business owners ensure that they are prepared for all types of business disruptions, including time sensitive advice, learning and coaching tools, a web-based plan builder, and a webcast on the topic.
